= Somogy County 3rd constituency =

Constituency in Hungary (2014–)

- Constituency for the National Assembly
- Location of Somogy county 03 within Somogy county

- Location of Somogy county within Hungary
- County: Somogy County
- Population: 75,062 (2022)
- Major settlements: Marcali

Current constituency
- Created: 2011
- Party: Tisza Party
- Member: Csaba Attila Bakos
- Elected: 2026

The Somogy County 3rd parliamentary constituency is one of the 106 constituencies into which the territory of Hungary is divided by Act CCIII of 2011, and in which voters can elect one member of the National Assembly. The standard abbreviation of the constituency name is: Somogy 03. OEVK. The seat is Marcali.

== Area ==
The constituency includes the following settlements:

1. Alsóbogát
2. Balatonberény
3. Balatonboglár
4. Balatonfenyves
5. Balatonkeresztúr
6. Balatonlelle
7. Balatonmáriafürdő
8. Balatonszentgyörgy
9. Balatonújlak
10. Bodrog
11. Böhönye
12. Buzsák
13. Csákány
14. Csombárd
15. Csömend
16. Edde
17. Fonyód
18. Főnyed
19. Gadány
20. Gamás
21. Gyugy
22. Hács
23. Hetes
24. Hollád
25. Hosszúvíz
26. Kelevíz
27. Kéthely
28. Kisberény
29. Látrány
30. Lengyeltóti
31. Libickozma
32. Magyaregres
33. Marcali
34. Mesztegnyő
35. Mezőcsokonya
36. Nagybajom
37. Nagyszakácsi
38. Nemesdéd
39. Nemeskisfalud
40. Nemesvid
41. Nikla
42. Ordacsehi
43. Osztopán
44. Öreglak
45. Pálmajor
46. Pamuk
47. Polány
48. Pusztakovácsi
49. Sávoly
50. Somogyaszaló
51. Somogyfajsz
52. Somogygeszti
53. Somogyjád
54. Somogysámson
55. Somogysárd
56. Somogysimonyi
57. Somogyszentpál
58. Somogytúr
59. Somogyvámos
60. Somogyvár
61. Somogyzsitfa
62. Szegerdő
63. Szenyér
64. Szőkedencs
65. Szőlősgyörök
66. Tapsony
67. Táska
68. Tikos
69. Újvárfalva
70. Varászló
71. Várda
72. Vörs

Name	Party	Term	Election
József Attila Móring	Fidesz-KDNP	2014–2026	Results of the 2014 parliamentary election:
József Attila Móring	Fidesz-KDNP	2014–2026	Results of the 2018 parliamentary election:
József Attila Móring	Fidesz-KDNP	2014–2026	Results of the 2022 parliamentary election:
Csaba Attila Bakos	Tisza Party	2026 – present	Results of the 2026 parliamentary election: 48.28%

== Demographics ==
Historical population
Year	Pop.	±%
2011	79,567	—
2022	75,062	−5.7%

The demographics of the constituency are as follows. The population of constituency No. 3 of Somogy County was 75,062 on 1 October 2022. The population of the constituency decreased by 4,505 people between the 2011 and 2022 censuses. Based on the age composition, the majority of the population in the constituency is middle-aged with 27,282 people, while the least is children with 12,697 people. 79.3% of the population of the constituency has internet access.

According to the highest level of completed education, those with a high school diploma are the most numerous, with 18,762 people, followed by skilled workers with 17,387 people.

According to economic activity, almost half of the population is employed, 32,335 people, the second most significant group is inactive earners, who are mainly pensioners, with 22,028 people.

The most significant ethnic group in the constituency is German with 2,404 people and Romani with 2,018 people. The proportion of foreign citizens without Hungarian citizenship is 4.2%.

According to religious composition, the largest religion of the residents of the constituency is Roman Catholic (27,236 people), and a significant community is the Calvinist (2,501 people). The number of those not belonging to a religious community is also significant (6,098 people), the second largest group in the constituency after the Roman Catholic religion.

== Sources ==
- ↑ Vjt.: "2011. évi CCIII. törvény az országgyűlési képviselők választásáról". Nemzeti Jogszabálytár. Magyar Közlöny Lap- és Könyvkiadó Kft.
- ↑ KSH: "Az országgyűlési egyéni választókerületek adatai". Népszámlálás 2011. Központi Statisztikai Hivatal.
- ↑ NVI: "Egyéni jelöltek".
