= Sávoly =

- Village
- Coat of arms

- Location of Somogy county in Hungary

- Location of Sávoly
- Coordinates: 46.59335°N 17.26453°E
- Country: Hungary
- Region: Southern Transdanubia
- County: Somogy
- District: Marcali
- RC Diocese: Kaposvár

Area
  - Total: 26.84 km^{2} (10.36 sq mi)

Population (2017)
  - Total: 486
  - Density: 18.1/km^{2} (46.9/sq mi)
- Demonym: sávolyi
- Time zone: UTC+1 (CET)
  - Summer (DST): UTC+2 (CEST)
- Postal code: 8732
- Area code: (+36) 85
- Motorways: M7
- Distance from Budapest: 182 km (113 mi) Northeast
- NUTS 3 code: HU232
- MP: József Attila Móring (KDNP)
- Website: Sávoly Online

Sávoly (Hungarian: [ˈʃaːvoj]) is a village in Somogy county, Hungary.

== About Sávoly ==
Population: 576
Area: 1.19 km^{2}
Fields: 25.65 km^{2}

The road running across the bridge of the Marótvölgyi Channel goes to Sávoly. Water flows very slowly in the channel, since it has a new task recently: it cannot reach the River Zala but serves as the cradle of reservoir II of Small Balaton, a lake. The low-lying, marshy, boggy land, which is now the lowest point of the Somogy county lying west of the Marcali ridge, was once the home of Lake Jankó. Today, however, it is covered in sedge, with clusters of trees here and there. One can take the busy main road 7, running parallel to the village, at two places. The village has its own railway station on the Budapest-Nagykanizsa line, although a short walk is needed to get to the residential area after getting off the train.

The nearby Lake Balaton attracts many tourists. Foreigners even tend to buy property here: at least 40 houses have passed into the proprietorship of Germans and Austrians. With an investment of several hundred million forints, a share company is building a restaurant, a pension, a lorry station and a gas station by the main road, and it would like to build up the sewage system together with the local government. The great project has one more pillar: about 1 km from the Hulapagos there is hot water hidden underground. According to analysis, the water temperature is 90 °C, its salt content is 11 kg/m^{3}, and the maximal water output is 5000 m^{3}/day.

The expression "Hupolagos" is still in use today: according to the popular tradition there was a domed castle here, hence the name. Archaeological findings of vessels and coins have also been discovered in the territory.

Here, next to road 7, plans crucial for the future of the village may come true. A local enterprise is planning to buy 0.1 km^{2} to add to the 1.2 km^{2} it already possesses in order to build a spa and a hotel. Nevertheless, more resources and the effectuation of the government program aimed at building up the road-network are needed for the execution of the plans. Nature lovers can cycle around Small Balaton passing through Sávoly on the bicycle road.

The neighborhood is interested in pursuing tourism. The northern part of the territories of the St. Hubertus Rifle Club of Somogysimonyi extends to the oak and acacia groves west of the railway station. The road to Kiskomárom, which people use to go to the monthly fair and the shops, takes the hunters to another part of the wood, where they can wander as far as Szőkedencs.

The first documentation of the history of Sávoly dates back to 1397. Its name appears as Sauol. In 1405 Mistress Katics, daughter of György Fejéregyházi, gave her mortgageable estates to John son of Anthimus, former Alban of Slavonia. Later documents deal with the donation of Kis- and Nagysávoly. In 1406, part of Kissávoly was given as a gift to György, son of Lóránt Berzenczei. Viceroy János Hunyadi gave the place to the Kismaróti and Kissávolyi families in 1447. In the 15th century, it changed hands very often. The landowners were the Pati Török family, the abbot of Murakeresztúr, Bertalan Chernel of Szentjakab and Vice Treasurer János Tolnai Bornemissza, who got it from King Matthias as a grant. In 1480 Sandrin, son of György Berzenczei, brought an action against the Török Kocsárd family because of Nagysávoly. The lands were often bought and sold in the 16th century as well. Thus, the Orros family, Imre Szerdahelyi, János Török, then Bálint Török, the widow of László Komjáthy, Máté Nagy, István Zerdahelyi, Boldizsár Lengyel and Pál Bornemissza were all among the landowners. During the Turkish occupation of Hungary, these settlements were also destroyed. It was resettled in 1711, when it was the property of Count Pál Festetics.

It remained in the hands of the family until the 1930s, but part of the lands had passed into the proprietorship of the Hungarian Land Institute by then. It was the most populous village of that time. In 1932, 1,005 inhabitants lived in the 196 houses. The co-operative credit association was already in operation; in 1947, it was united with the Transdanubian Savings Bank Inc. There was also a co-operative dairy and a smallholders' association. The Roman Catholic elementary school was founded in 1750. The closest post office was in Somogysámson. The telephone and the district-notary were also available only there, but in 1951, the administrative centre was transferred to the village. The Liberty Agricultural Co-Operative operated between 1952 and 1956. From 1959 the New Life Agricultural Co-Operative cultivated the lands, later joined by Főnyed, Szegerdő, and Szőkedencs. However, the co-operative went bankrupt in 1992. Since then the Darim Ltd. has grown fodder-plants and bread crops in 10 km^{2} of land and another, not local contractor, on 6 km^{2}. The company has built a modern cleaning-drying apparatus, which gives a possibility to dry the crops grown not only in its own land but also in the neighboring farms. The apparatus is suitable for drying nuts and seeds as well. Two local agricultural contractors have chosen the province of animal husbandry. In one of the farms, 30 cows give fresh milk daily. In the other, 100 sows and their progeny are kept in the Szökedencs premises. Some try to find jobs in trade and services individually, but they rather intend it to be an additional income. Nearly forty people are compelled to commute to farther workplaces.

The people of Sávoly have had gas heating since 1996, and 80% of the houses are on the gas distributing system. Every second house has a telephone. The six self-contained council flats are in good condition, and so are the primary and the nursery school buildings. The Roman Catholic Church of the village was consecrated in 1875. In front of it stands the memorial to the fallen of the two world wars. Medical service is available locally, and the doctor and the nurse have consulting hours daily. The closest vet is in Somogysámson or Balatonszentgyörgy. The culture house and the library, which is open every day, are planning to resurrect the youth club soon. The local organization of the Red Cross has been working well for five years, and at present it has 55 members. They organized the Senior Day and the vintage procession on the second Sunday of September. The local government celebrated the year 2000 with the inauguration of the flag and the coat of arms. The symbol of the village is being designed based on its traditions, and therefore it will represent a crane from the Festetics coat of arms, and a ploughshare and a wheat ear from a seal used in the beginning of the 20th century.

== Balatonring ==
The motor racing circuit Balatonring will be constructed near Sávoly. The first Hungarian GP was scheduled to be held in 2010.
