= Csaba Attila Bakos =

Hungarian politician

Member of the National Assembly
- Incumbent
- Assumed office 9 May 2026
- Preceded by: József Attila Móring
- Constituency: Somogy 3rd

Personal details
- Party: Tisza

Csaba Attila Bakos is a Hungarian politician who was elected member of the National Assembly in 2026 representing the Somogy County 3rd constituency. He previously worked as an entrepreneur, titular university associate professor, and reserve army colonel.
