= Pálmajor =

- Village
- Coat of arms

- Location of Somogy county in Hungary

- Location of Pálmajor
- Coordinates: 46.39385°N 17.56385°E
- Country: Hungary
- Region: Southern Transdanubia
- County: Somogy
- District: Kaposvár
- RC Diocese: Kaposvár

Area
  - Total: 5.53 km^{2} (2.14 sq mi)

Population (2020)
  - Total: 313 ▲
  - Density: 56.6/km^{2} (147/sq mi)
- Demonym: pálmajori
- Time zone: UTC+1 (CET)
  - Summer (DST): UTC+2 (CEST)
- Postal code: 7561
- Area code: (+36) 82
- NUTS 3 code: HU232
- MP: József Attila Móring (KDNP)
- Website: Pálmajor Online

Pálmajor is a village in Somogy county, Hungary.
