= Somogy County Assembly =

Somogy County Council Somogy Megyei Közgyűlés

Type
- Type: County Council

History
- Founded: 1990

Leadership
- President: Norbert Bíró, Fidesz–KDNP since 13 October 2019
- Vice-presidents: Dr Adrián Szajcz, Gábor Huszti, Fidesz–KDNP since 13 October 2019

Structure
- Seats: 15 councillors
- Political groups: Administration: Fidesz–KDNP (9); Other parties (6): Jobbik (2); SE (2); DK (1); Momentum (1)
- Length of term: five years

Elections
- Last election: 13 October 2019
- Next election: 2024

Meeting place
- County Hall, Kaposvár

Website
- csongrad-megye.hu

The Somogy County Council (Hungarian: Somogy Megyei Közgyűlés) is the local legislative body of Somogy County in Southern Transdanubia in Hungary.

== Composition ==
=== 2019 ===
The Council elected at the 2019 local government elections, is made up of 15 counselors, with the following party composition:

Summary of the 13 October 2019 election results
Party	Votes	%	+/-	Seats	+/-	Seats %
Fidesz–KDNP	55,058	52.93	▲4.98	9	Steady	60.00
Association for Somogy (SE)	16,631	15.99	▼1.04	2	Steady	13.33
Jobbik	12,214	11.74	▼7.60	2	▼1	13.33
Democratic Coalition (DK)	9,336	8.22	▲3.18	1	Steady	6.67
Momentum Movement (Momentum)	6,827	8.07		1	▲1	6.67
Total	104,016	100.0		15	▼1	
Voter turnout		52.03				

After the elections in 2019 the Assembly controlled by the Fidesz–KDNP party alliance which has 9 councillors, versus 2 Jobbik, 2 Association for Somogy, 1 Democratic Coalition (DK) and 1 Momentum Movement councillors.
