= Nemesdéd =

- Village
- Location of Somogy county in Hungary

- Location of Nemesdéd
- Coordinates: 46.43266°N 17.24146°E
- Country: Hungary
- Region: Southern Transdanubia
- County: Somogy
- District: Marcali
- RC Diocese: Kaposvár

Area
  - Total: 26.61 km^{2} (10.27 sq mi)

Population (2017)
  - Total: 719
  - Density: 27.0/km^{2} (70.0/sq mi)
- Demonym(s): dédi, nemesdédi
- Time zone: UTC+1 (CET)
  - Summer (DST): UTC+2 (CEST)
- Postal code: 8722
- Area code: (+36) 85
- NUTS 3 code: HU232
- MP: József Attila Móring (KDNP)
- Website: Nemesdéd Online

Nemesdéd is a village in Somogy county, Hungary.
