= Hosszúvíz =

- Village
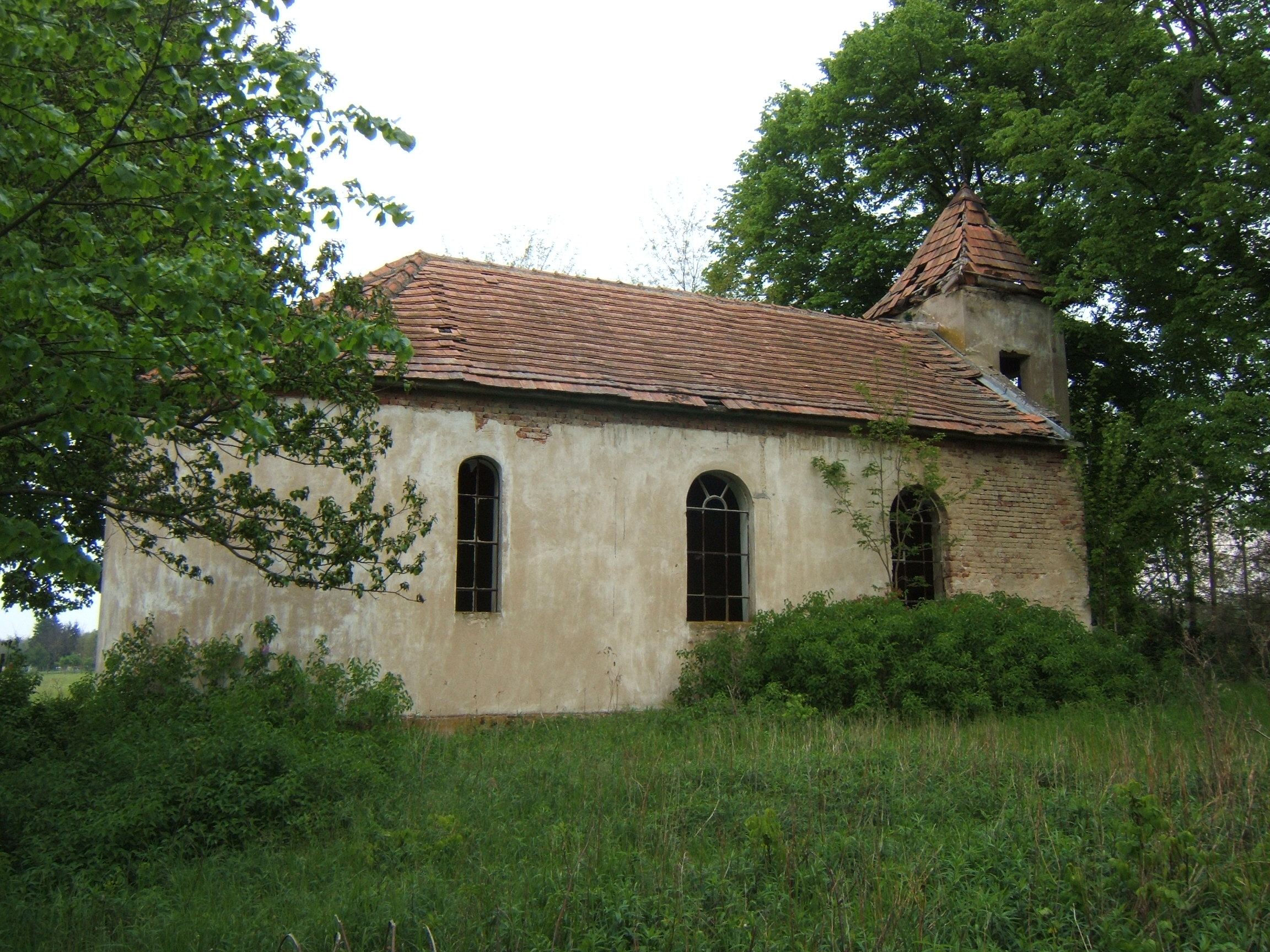
- Chapel of Cserfekvés in Hosszúvíz

- Coat of arms

- Location of Somogy county in Hungary

- Location of Hosszúvíz
- Coordinates: 46.50453°N 17.46706°E
- Country: Hungary
- Region: Southern Transdanubia
- County: Somogy
- District: Marcali
- RC Diocese: Kaposvár

Area
  - Total: 7.1 km^{2} (2.7 sq mi)

Population (2017)
  - Total: 46
  - Density: 6.5/km^{2} (17/sq mi)
- Demonym: hosszúvízi
- Time zone: UTC+1 (CET)
  - Summer (DST): UTC+2 (CEST)
- Postal code: 8716
- Area code: (+36) 85
- NUTS 3 code: HU232
- MP: József Attila Móring (KDNP)
- Website: Hosszúvíz Online

Hosszúvíz is a village in Somogy county, Hungary.
