= Varászló =

- Village
- Location of Somogy county in Hungary

- Location of Varászló
- Coordinates: 46.435089°N 17.215961°E
- Country: Hungary
- Region: Southern Transdanubia
- County: Somogy
- District: Marcali
- RC Diocese: Kaposvár

Area
  - Total: 12.76 km^{2} (4.93 sq mi)

Population (2017)
  - Total: 142
  - Density: 11.1/km^{2} (28.8/sq mi)
- Demonym: varászlói
- Time zone: UTC+1 (CET)
  - Summer (DST): UTC+2 (CEST)
- Postal code: 8723
- Area code: (+36) 85
- NUTS 3 code: HU232
- MP: József Attila Móring (KDNP)

Varászló is a village in Somogy county, Hungary.
