= Balatonmáriafürdő =

- Village
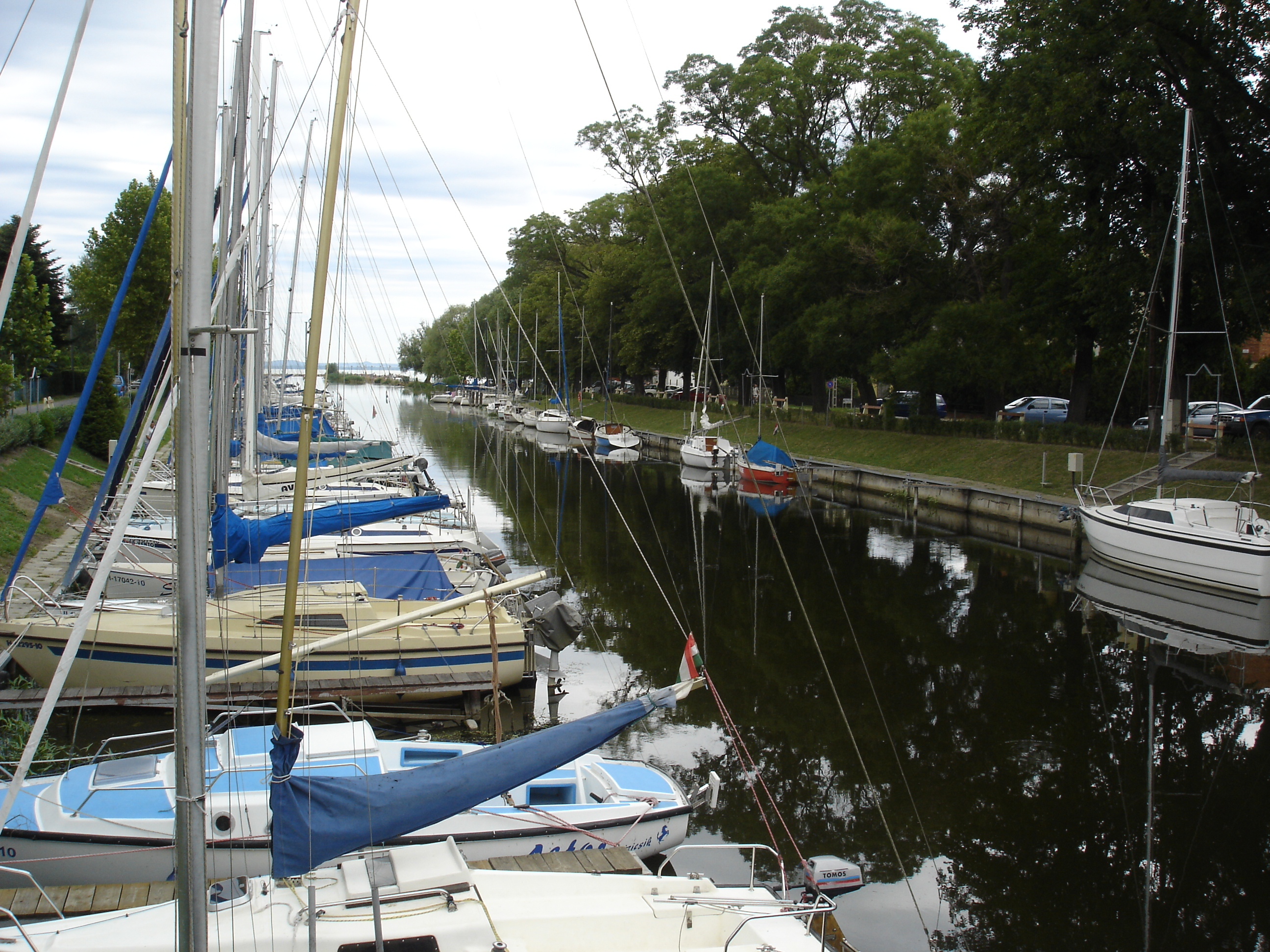
- Marina of the village

- Coat of arms

- Location of Balatonmáriafürdő
- Coordinates: 46.70610°N 17.37046°E
- Country: Hungary
- Region: Southern Transdanubia
- County: Somogy
- District: Marcali
- RC Diocese: Kaposvár

Area
  - Total: 26.77 km^{2} (10.34 sq mi)

Population (2017)
  - Total: 677
  - Density: 25.3/km^{2} (65.5/sq mi)
- Demonym(s): máriafürdői, balatonmáriafürdői
- Time zone: UTC+1 (CET)
  - Summer (DST): UTC+2 (CEST)
- Postal code: 8647
- Area code: (+36) 85
- Patron Saint: Holy Mary
- Motorways: M7
- Distance from Budapest: 166 km (103 mi) Northeast
- NUTS 3 code: HU232
- MP: József Attila Móring (KDNP)
- Website: Balatonmáriafürdő Online

Balatonmáriafürdő is a village located on the southern shore of Lake Balaton in Somogy county, Hungary.

== Public life ==
=== Mayors ===
- 1990-1994: László Szirják (Baráti Kör Egyesülete)
- 1994-1998: László Szirják (független)
- 1998-2002: László Szirják (független)
- 2002-2006: Dr. Sándor Bollók (független)
- 2006-2010: György Vince Galácz (független)
- 2010-2014: György Vince Galácz (független)
- 2014-2019: György Vince Galácz (független)
- 2019-től: György Vince Galácz (független)
