= Nagyszakácsi =

- Village
- Coat of arms

- Location of Somogy county in Hungary

- Location of Nagyszakácsi
- Coordinates: 46.49725°N 17.31771°E
- Country: Hungary
- Region: Southern Transdanubia
- County: Somogy
- District: Marcali
- RC Diocese: Kaposvár

Area
  - Total: 21.37 km^{2} (8.25 sq mi)

Population (2017)
  - Total: 418
  - Density: 19.6/km^{2} (50.7/sq mi)
- Demonym(s): szakácsi, nagyszakácsi
- Time zone: UTC+1 (CET)
  - Summer (DST): UTC+2 (CEST)
- Postal code: 8739
- Area code: (+36) 85
- NUTS 3 code: HU232
- MP: József Attila Móring (KDNP)
- Website: Nagyszakácsi Online

Nagyszakácsi is a village in Somogy county, Hungary.

== Sightseeings ==
The famous contest of medieval Chefs are organized every year, during the summer season.
