= Somogyaszaló =

- Village
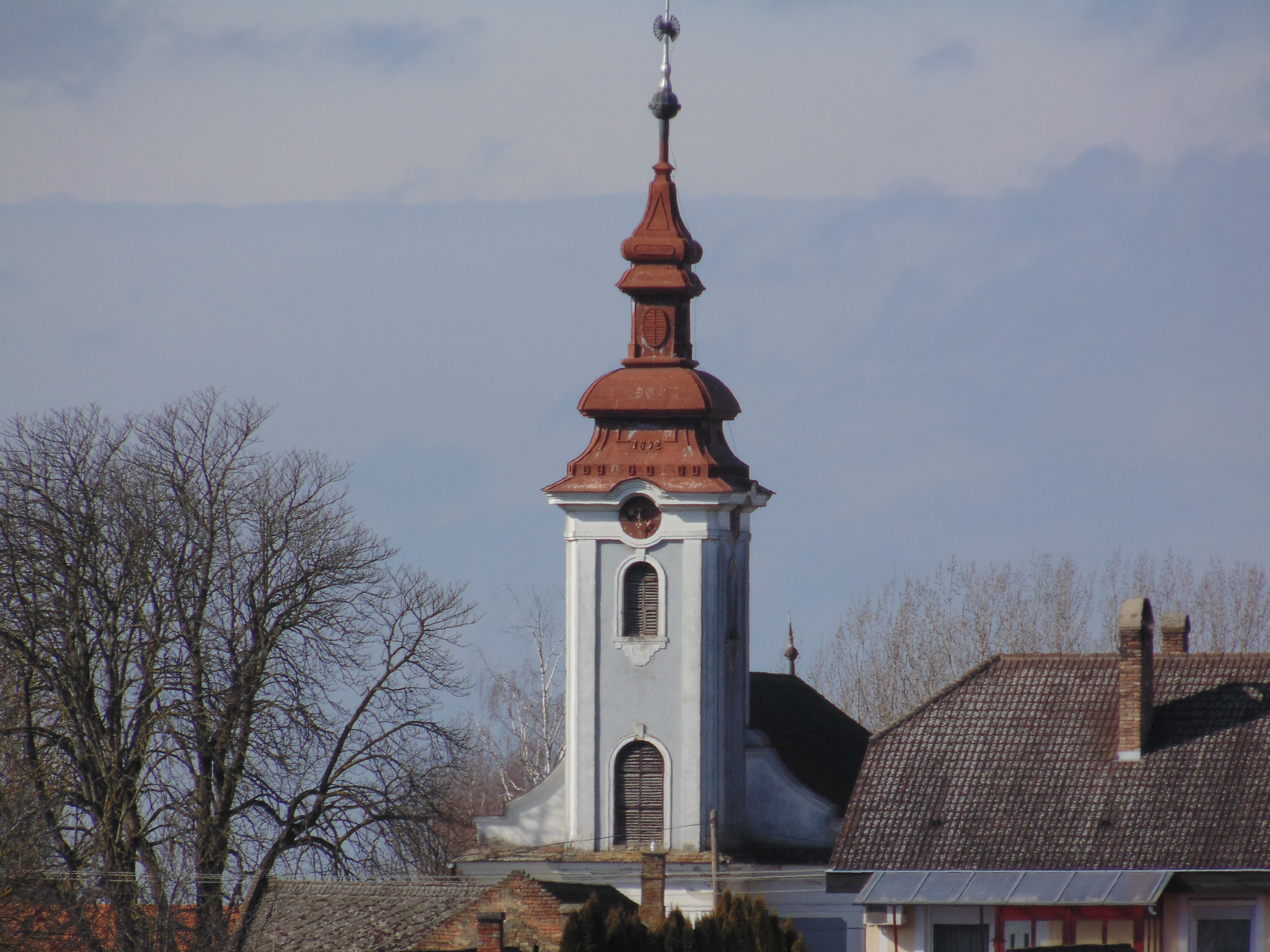
- Reformed Church of Somogyaszaló

- Coat of arms

- Location of Somogy county in Hungary

- Location of Somogyaszaló
- Coordinates: 46.45728°N 17.80431°E
- Country: Hungary
- Region: Southern Transdanubia
- County: Somogy
- District: Kaposvár
- RC Diocese: Kaposvár

Area
  - Total: 22.12 km^{2} (8.54 sq mi)

Population (2017)
  - Total: 742
  - Density: 33.5/km^{2} (86.9/sq mi)
- Demonym(s): aszalói, somogyaszalói
- Time zone: UTC+1 (CET)
  - Summer (DST): UTC+2 (CEST)
- Postal code: 7452
- Area code: (+36) 82
- NUTS 3 code: HU232
- MP: József Attila Móring (KDNP)
- Website: Somogyaszaló Online

Somogyaszaló is a village in Somogy county, Hungary.

== Etymology ==
According to the local legends the name derives from the activity of the former residents of the village: food drying (Hungarian: aszalás). The archive records state that the local people dried woods at that time when the village was established.
