= Balatonújlak =

- Village
- Coat of arms

- Location of Somogy county in Hungary

- Location of Balatonújlak
- Coordinates: 46.67197°N 17.38523°E
- Country: Hungary
- Region: Southern Transdanubia
- County: Somogy
- District: Marcali
- RC Diocese: Kaposvár

Area
  - Total: 10.81 km^{2} (4.17 sq mi)

Population (2017)
  - Total: 445
  - Density: 41.2/km^{2} (107/sq mi)
- Demonym(s): újlaki, balatonújlaki
- Time zone: UTC+1 (CET)
  - Summer (DST): UTC+2 (CEST)
- Postal code: 8712
- Area code: (+36) 85
- Motorways: M7
- Distance from Budapest: 175 km (109 mi) Northeast
- NUTS 3 code: HU232
- MP: József Attila Móring (KDNP)
- Website: Balatonújlak Online

Balatonújlak is a village in Somogy county, Hungary.
