= Nemeskisfalud =

- Village
- Location of Somogy county in Hungary

- Location of Nemeskisfalud
- Coordinates: 46.43984°N 17.36568°E
- Country: Hungary
- Region: Southern Transdanubia
- County: Somogy
- District: Marcali
- RC Diocese: Kaposvár

Area
  - Total: 2.82 km^{2} (1.09 sq mi)

Population (2017)
  - Total: 177
  - Density: 62.8/km^{2} (163/sq mi)
- Demonym(s): kisfaludi, nemeskisfaludi
- Time zone: UTC+1 (CET)
  - Summer (DST): UTC+2 (CEST)
- Postal code: 8717
- Area code: (+36) 85
- NUTS 3 code: HU232
- MP: József Attila Móring (KDNP)

Nemeskisfalud is a village in Somogy county, Hungary.

== Notable residents ==
- József Madarász (1814 – 1915), Hungarian lawyer, politician
