= Tapsony =

- Village
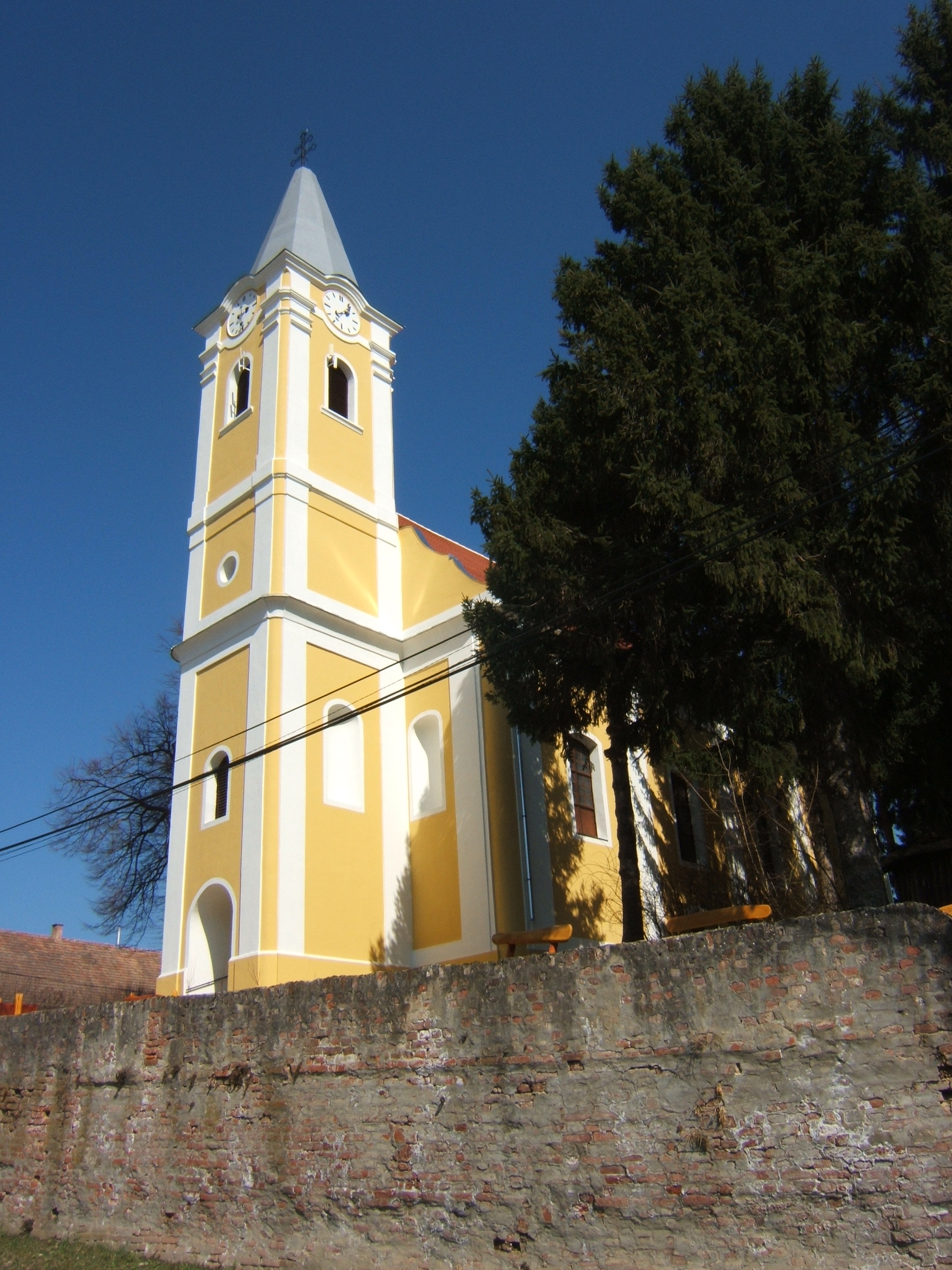
- The Roman Catholic Church of Tapsony

- Coat of arms

- Location of Somogy county in Hungary

- Location of Tapsony
- Coordinates: 46.45506°N 17.33433°E
- Country: Hungary
- Region: Southern Transdanubia
- County: Somogy
- District: Marcali
- RC Diocese: Kaposvár

Area
  - Total: 31.61 km^{2} (12.20 sq mi)

Population (2017)
  - Total: 700
  - Density: 22/km^{2} (57/sq mi)
- Demonym: tapsonyi
- Time zone: UTC+1 (CET)
  - Summer (DST): UTC+2 (CEST)
- Postal code: 8718
- Area code: (+36) 85
- NUTS 3 code: HU232
- MP: József Attila Móring (KDNP)
- Website: Tapsony Online

Tapsony is a village in Somogy county, Hungary. It has a village hall for social events held throughout the year. There is a playing field where the football team of Tapsony play its home matches. It has good bus links with Bohonye and Marcali. The Pausch factory provides local employment and beams out an internet signal, which you can subscribe to through an internet company. The village is surrounded by rolling countryside which is mainly for agricultural use, in the summer some fields are planted with maize and sunflowers. Temperatures in the summer can reach the high 30s, winter temperatures can be as low as minus 20.
