= Somogysimonyi =

- Village
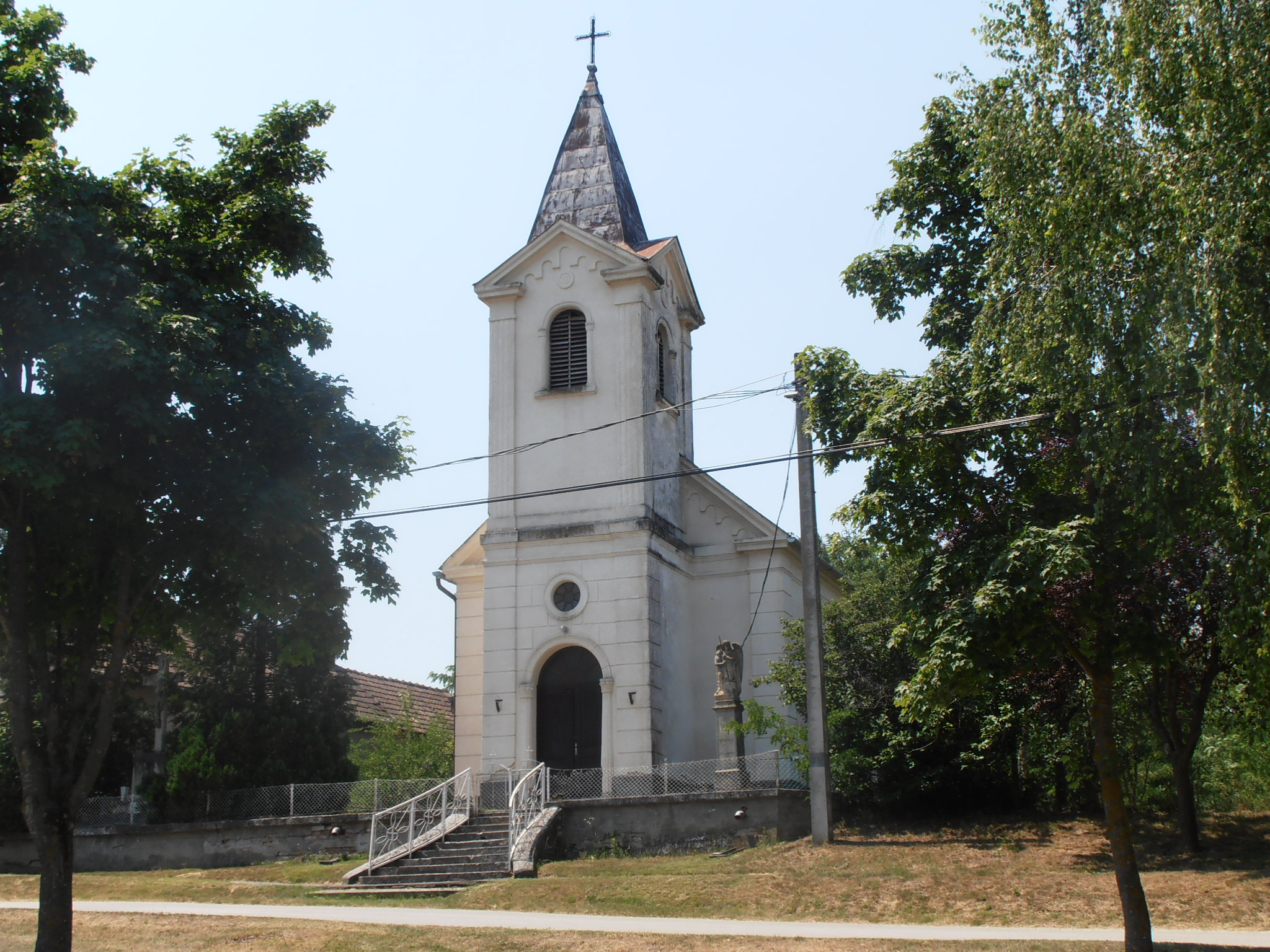
- Roman Catholic Church of Somogysimonyi

- Coat of arms

- Location of Somogy county in Hungary

- Location of Somogysimonyi
- Coordinates: 46.48634°N 17.20705°E
- Country: Hungary
- Region: Southern Transdanubia
- County: Somogy
- District: Marcali
- RC Diocese: Kaposvár

Area
  - Total: 15.82 km^{2} (6.11 sq mi)

Population (2017)
  - Total: 90
  - Density: 5.7/km^{2} (15/sq mi)
- Demonym(s): simonyi, somogysimonyi
- Time zone: UTC+1 (CET)
  - Summer (DST): UTC+2 (CEST)
- Postal code: 8737
- Area code: (+36) 85
- Patron Saint: Holy Mary
- NUTS 3 code: HU232
- MP: József Attila Móring (KDNP)

Somogysimonyi is a village in Somogy County, Hungary. It incorporates the earlier separated villages of Gardos-puszta, Irma-puszta and Angyalvár-telep.

== Geography ==
It lies southwest of Marcali at the border between Somogy and Zala County. It is separated from Nemesvid by the Forest of Gödörberk which consists mostly of oak trees. There are fields of May bells and cyclamen in the forest. Fallow deer, deer, roe deer and wild boars as well as foxes, polecats and weasels live there.

== History ==
Somogysimonyi was earlier known as Simonyi and is since the 14th century inhabited. The village was first mentioned in the papal tithe register between 1332 and 1337. The Chernel family of Szentjakab owned the settlement in 1481. It perished during the Turkish occupation. It was already uninhabited according to the 1550 tax register. Its owner at the beginning of the 18th century was Pál Festetics and later from the 20th century the Zichy family. It had its own primary school. In 1932 a new Roman Catholic Church was built.

=== Gardos-puszta ===
Gardos-puszta was first mentioned in the papal tithe register between 1332 and 1337 and had its own parish. It was owned by the Kanizsai family and was called as Gardus in 1395, then László Török acquired it in 1439, but he pawned it to András Csapi in 1464. Later it was in the hands of János Bornemissza de Tolna deputy treasurer. Ferenc Török owned it in 1550 but it was already empty. Between 1701 and 1703 it was in the hand of Miklós Ropoli and then from 1726 of the Festetics family.

== Main sights ==
- Roman Catholic church - built in 1932 with a plaque remembering on those who died in the First and Second World War.
