= Csömend =

- Village
- Coat of arms

- Location of Somogy county in Hungary

- Location of Csömend
- Coordinates: 46.57135°N 17.48885°E
- Country: Hungary
- Region: Southern Transdanubia
- County: Somogy
- District: Marcali
- RC Diocese: Kaposvár

Area
  - Total: 8.66 km^{2} (3.34 sq mi)

Population (2017)
  - Total: 298
  - Density: 34.4/km^{2} (89.1/sq mi)
- Demonym: csömendi
- Time zone: UTC+1 (CET)
  - Summer (DST): UTC+2 (CEST)
- Postal code: 8700
- Area code: (+36) 85
- NUTS 3 code: HU232
- MP: József Attila Móring (KDNP)
- Website: Csömend Online

Csömend is a village in Somogy County, Hungary.
