= Pamuk =

Pamuk is a Turkish word meaning cotton, and may refer to:

== Surname ==
- Melisa Aslı Pamuk (born 1991), Dutch-Turkish beauty pageant titleholder, actress and model
- Orhan Pamuk (born 1952), Turkish novelist and Nobel Prize winner
- Şevket Pamuk (born 1950), Turkish economist, brother of Orhan Pamuk
- Uğur Pamuk (born 1989), Azerbaijani international footballer

== Fictional characters ==
- Kemal Pamuk, a fictional character on the television show Downton Abbey

== Places ==
- Pamuk, Hungary, a village in Somogy county, Hungary
