= Magyaregres =

- Village
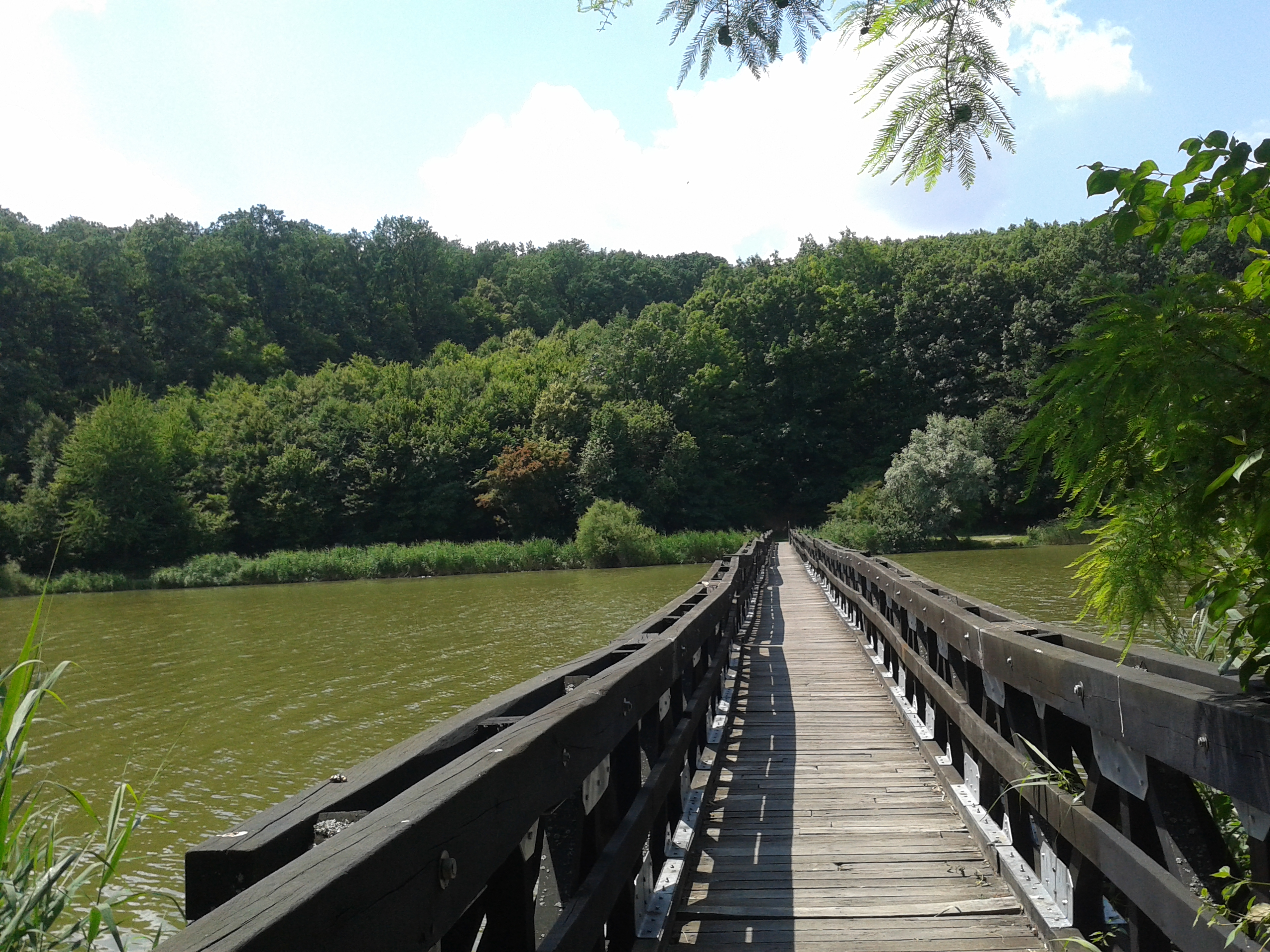
- Old Bridge in Magyaregres

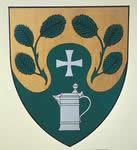
- Coat of arms

- Location of Somogy county in Hungary

- Location of Magyaregres
- Coordinates: 46.46009°N 17.77083°E
- Country: Hungary
- Region: Southern Transdanubia
- County: Somogy
- District: Kaposvár
- RC Diocese: Kaposvár

Area
  - Total: 14.4 km^{2} (5.6 sq mi)

Population (2017)
  - Total: 567
  - Density: 39.4/km^{2} (102/sq mi)
- Demonym: magyaregresi
- Time zone: UTC+1 (CET)
  - Summer (DST): UTC+2 (CEST)
- Postal code: 7441
- Area code: (+36) 82
- NUTS 3 code: HU232
- MP: József Attila Móring (KDNP)
- Website: Magyaregres Online

Magyaregres is a village in Somogy county, Hungary.
