= Pamuk, Hungary =

Pamuk
- Village
- Coat of arms

- Location of Somogy county in Hungary

- Location of Pamuk, Hungary
- Coordinates: 46.55118°N 17.63611°E
- Country: Hungary
- Region: Southern Transdanubia
- County: Somogy
- District: Fonyód
- RC Diocese: Kaposvár

Area
  - Total: 11.96 km^{2} (4.62 sq mi)

Population (2017)
  - Total: 264
  - Density: 22.1/km^{2} (57.2/sq mi)
- Demonym: pamuki
- Time zone: UTC+1 (CET)
  - Summer (DST): UTC+2 (CEST)
- Postal code: 8698
- Area code: (+36) 85
- Patron Saint: Michael Archangel
- NUTS 3 code: HU232
- MP: József Attila Móring (KDNP)
- Website: Pamuk Online

Pamuk is a village in Somogy county, Hungary.

== Etymology ==
Pamuk is a Turkish word meaning cotton.
