= Gadány =

Gadány Gadan (in Croatian)
- Village
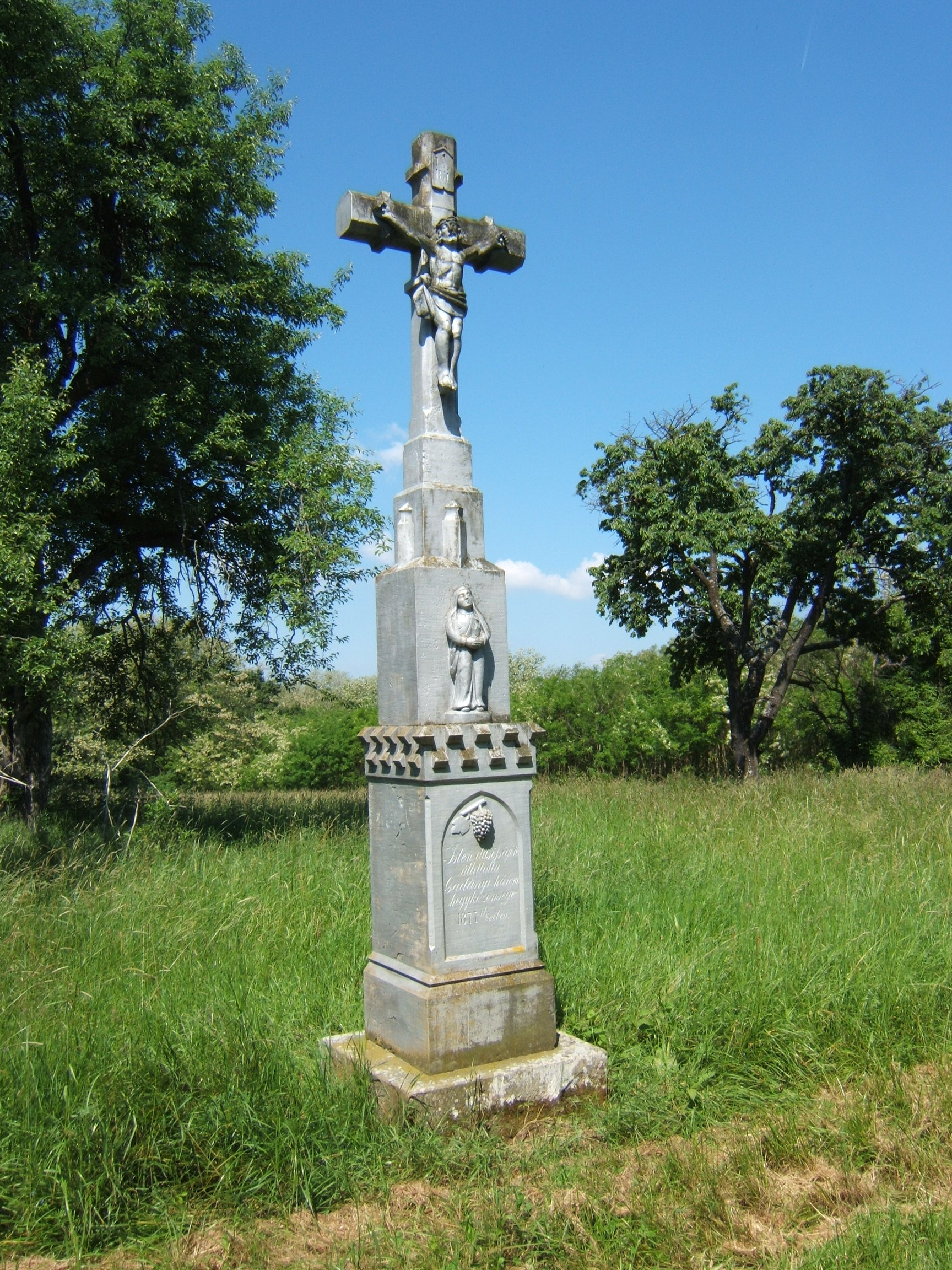
- Stonecross in Gadány

- Coat of arms

- Location of Somogy county in Hungary

- Location of Gadány
- Coordinates: 46.51620°N 17.39387°E
- Country: Hungary
- Region: Southern Transdanubia
- County: Somogy
- District: Marcali
- RC Diocese: Kaposvár

Area
  - Total: 21.54 km^{2} (8.32 sq mi)

Population (2017)
  - Total: 308
  - Density: 14.3/km^{2} (37.0/sq mi)
- Demonym: gadányi
- Time zone: UTC+1 (CET)
  - Summer (DST): UTC+2 (CEST)
- Postal code: 8716
- Area code: (+36) 85
- NUTS 3 code: HU232
- MP: József Attila Móring (KDNP)
- Website: Gadány Online

Gadány (Croatian: Gadan) is a village in Somogy county, Hungary.
