= Vése =

- Village
- Coat of arms

- Location of Somogy county in Hungary

- Location of Vése
- Coordinates: 46.41192°N 17.28822°E
- Country: Hungary
- Region: Southern Transdanubia
- County: Somogy
- District: Marcali
- RC Diocese: Kaposvár

Area
  - Total: 42.92 km^{2} (16.57 sq mi)

Population (2017)
  - Total: 751
  - Density: 17.5/km^{2} (45.3/sq mi)
- Demonym: vései
- Time zone: UTC+1 (CET)
  - Summer (DST): UTC+2 (CEST)
- Postal code: 8721
- Area code: (+36) 85
- NUTS 3 code: HU232
- MP: László Szászfalvi (KDNP)
- Website: Vése Online

Vése is a village in Somogy county, Hungary.
