= Csákány =

- Village
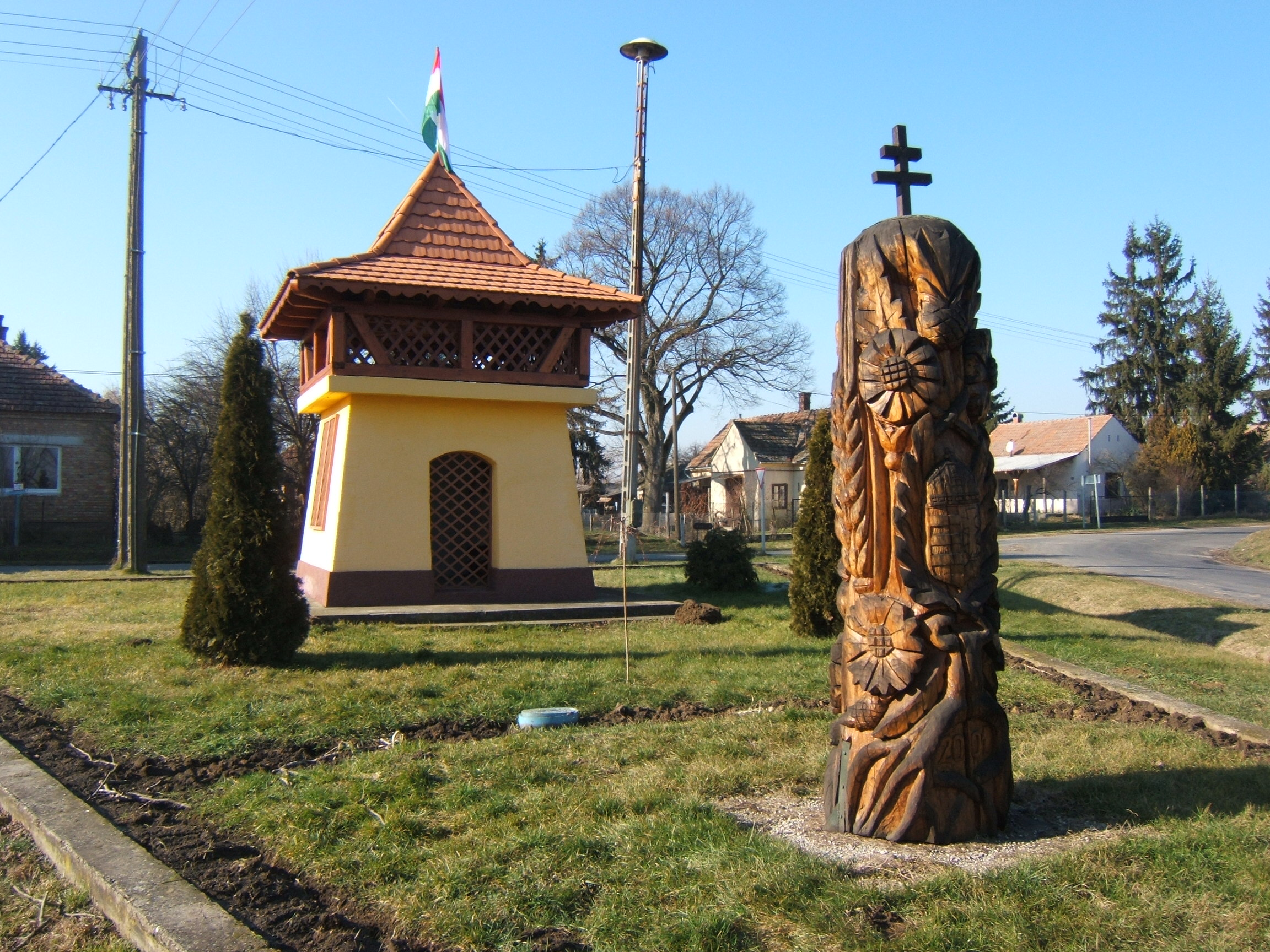
- Main square of Csákány

- Coat of arms

- Location of Somogy county in Hungary

- Location of Csákány
- Coordinates: 46.53515°N 17.27447°E
- Country: Hungary
- Region: Southern Transdanubia
- County: Somogy
- District: Marcali
- RC Diocese: Kaposvár

Area
  - Total: 16.09 km^{2} (6.21 sq mi)

Population (2017)
  - Total: 229
  - Density: 14.2/km^{2} (36.9/sq mi)
- Demonym: csákányi
- Time zone: UTC+1 (CET)
  - Summer (DST): UTC+2 (CEST)
- Postal code: 8735
- Area code: (+36) 85
- NUTS 3 code: HU232
- MP: József Attila Móring (KDNP)
- Website: Csákány Online

Csákány is a village in Somogy county, Hungary.
