= Libickozma =

- Village
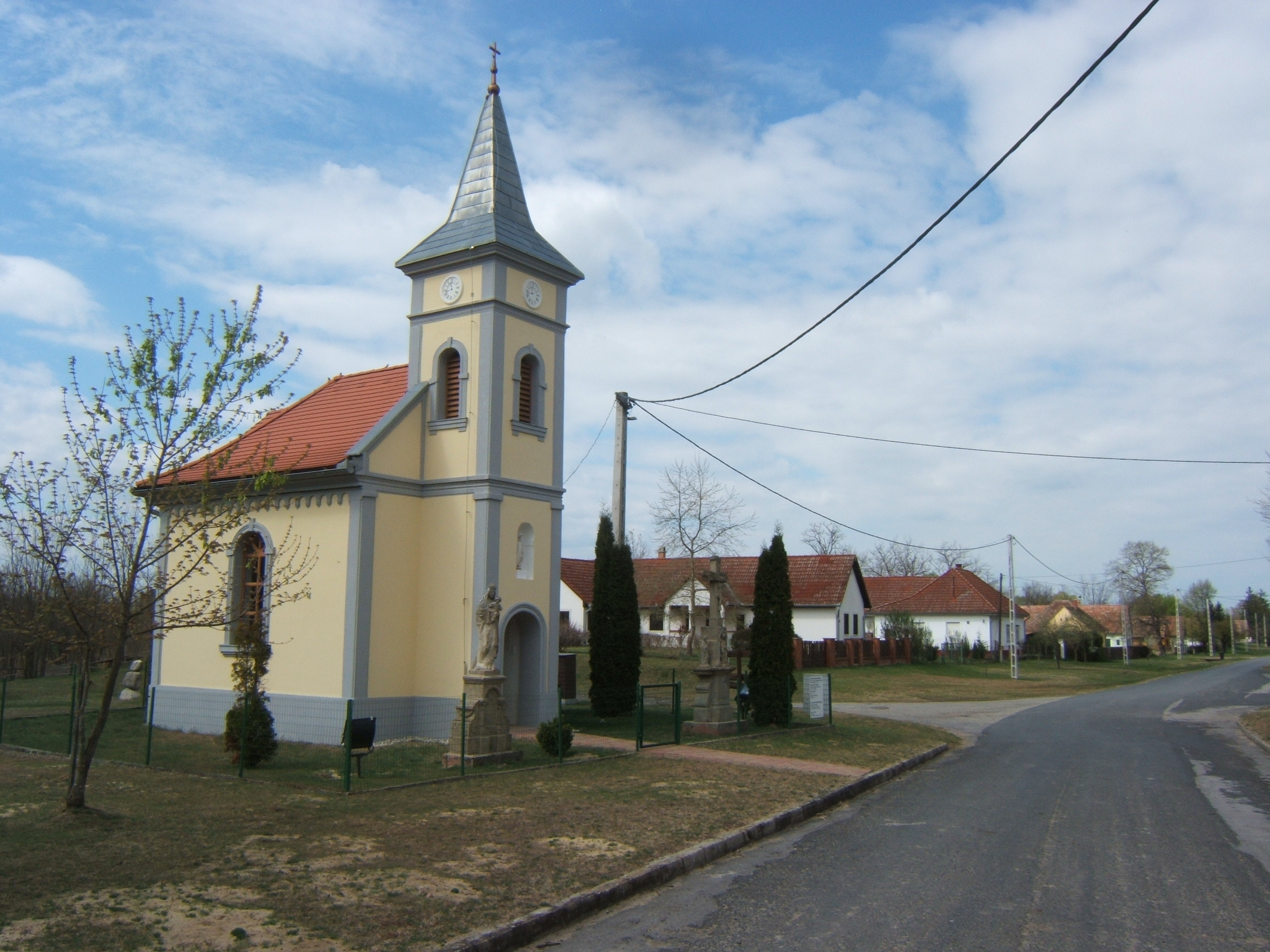
- The chapel of Libiczkozma

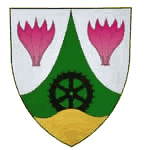
- Coat of arms

- Location of Somogy county in Hungary

- Location of Libickozma
- Coordinates: 46.52338°N 17.53244°E
- Country: Hungary
- Region: Southern Transdanubia
- County: Somogy
- District: Marcali
- RC Diocese: Kaposvár

Area
  - Total: 22.97 km^{2} (8.87 sq mi)

Population (2017)
  - Total: 27
  - Density: 1.2/km^{2} (3.0/sq mi)
- Demonym(s): kozmai, libickozmai
- Time zone: UTC+1 (CET)
  - Summer (DST): UTC+2 (CEST)
- Postal code: 8707
- Area code: (+36) 85
- NUTS 3 code: HU232
- MP: József Attila Móring (KDNP)
- Website: Libickozma Online

Libickozma is a village in Somogy county, Hungary.
