= Kisberény =

- Village
- Coat of arms

- Location of Somogy county in Hungary

- Location of Kisberény
- Coordinates: 46.63979°N 17.65935°E
- Country: Hungary
- Region: Southern Transdanubia
- County: Somogy
- District: Fonyód
- RC Diocese: Kaposvár

Area
  - Total: 7.46 km^{2} (2.88 sq mi)

Population (2017)
  - Total: 178
  - Density: 23.9/km^{2} (61.8/sq mi)
- Demonym: kisberényi
- Time zone: UTC+1 (CET)
  - Summer (DST): UTC+2 (CEST)
- Postal code: 8693
- Area code: (+36) 85
- Patron Saint: Catherine of Alexandria
- NUTS 3 code: HU232
- MP: József Attila Móring (KDNP)

Kisberény is a village in Somogy county, Hungary. It was the only settlement in the 18th and 19th century in the Somogy County with a Serbian majority.
