= Tikos =

Village in Southern Transdanubia, Hungary

- Village
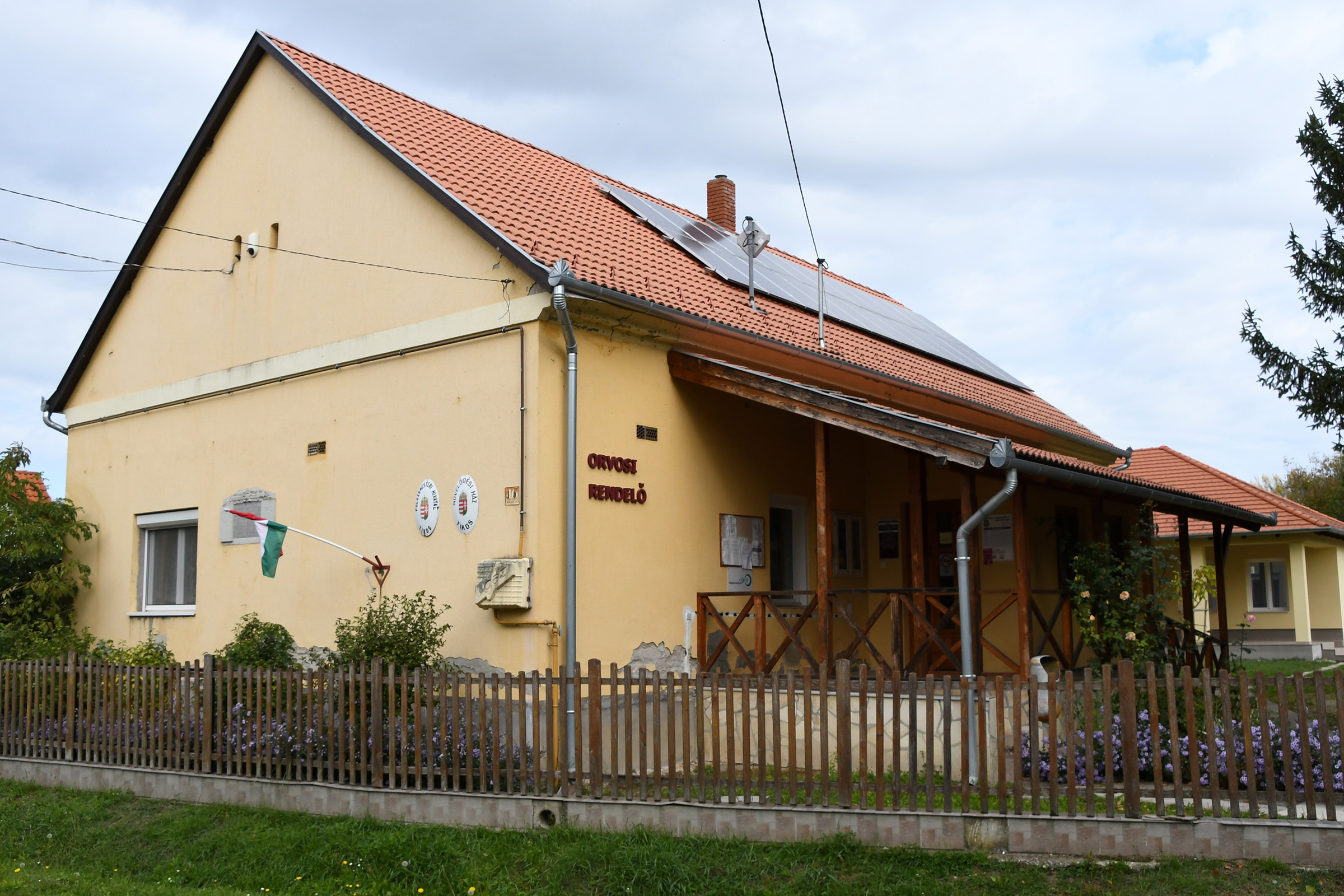
- Village hall

- Coat of arms

- Location of Somogy county in Hungary

- Location of Tikos
- Coordinates: 46.63543°N 17.28801°E
- Country: Hungary
- Region: Southern Transdanubia
- County: Somogy
- District: Marcali
- RC Diocese: Kaposvár

Area
  - Total: 3.35 km^{2} (1.29 sq mi)

Population (2017)
  - Total: 121
  - Density: 36.1/km^{2} (93.5/sq mi)
- Demonym: tikosi
- Time zone: UTC+1 (CET)
  - Summer (DST): UTC+2 (CEST)
- Postal code: 8731
- Area code: (+36) 85
- Motorways: M7
- Distance from Budapest: 177 km (110 mi) Northeast
- NUTS 3 code: HU232
- MP: József Attila Móring (KDNP)
- Website: Tikos Online

The postal code of Tikos is 8731. The village is located at the foot of Lake Balaton, about 180 km (110 mi) southeast of Budapest.

== History ==
According to László Szita the settlement was completely Hungarian in the 18th century.
