= Kelevíz =

- Village
- Coat of arms

- Location of Somogy county in Hungary

- Location of Kelevíz
- Coordinates: 46.52325°N 17.41642°E
- Country: Hungary
- Region: Southern Transdanubia
- County: Somogy
- District: Marcali
- RC Diocese: Kaposvár

Area
  - Total: 4.91 km^{2} (1.90 sq mi)

Population (2017)
  - Total: 318
  - Density: 64.8/km^{2} (168/sq mi)
- Demonym: kelevízi
- Time zone: UTC+1 (CET)
  - Summer (DST): UTC+2 (CEST)
- Postal code: 8714
- Area code: (+36) 85
- NUTS 3 code: HU232
- MP: József Attila Móring (KDNP)
- Website: Kelevíz Online

Kelevíz is a village in Somogy county, Hungary.
