= Szenyér =

- Village
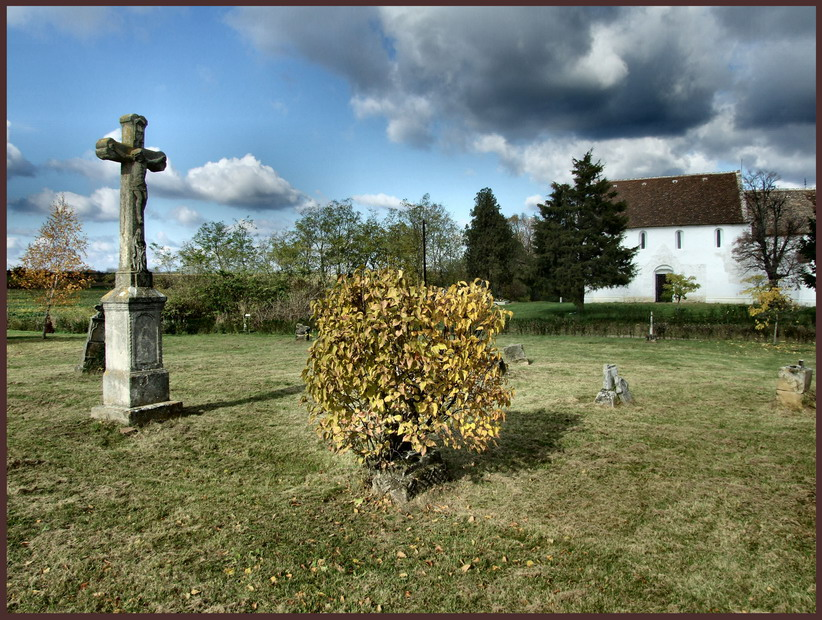
- Church of Szenyér from the Árpád era

- Coat of arms

- Location of Somogy county in Hungary

- Location of Szenyér
- Coordinates: 46.46378°N 17.36805°E
- Country: Hungary
- Region: Southern Transdanubia
- County: Somogy
- District: Marcali
- RC Diocese: Kaposvár

Area
  - Total: 20.19 km^{2} (7.80 sq mi)

Population (2017)
  - Total: 304
  - Density: 15.1/km^{2} (39.0/sq mi)
- Demonym: szenyéri
- Time zone: UTC+1 (CET)
  - Summer (DST): UTC+2 (CEST)
- Postal code: 8717
- Area code: (+36) 85
- NUTS 3 code: HU232
- MP: József Attila Móring (KDNP)

Szenyér is a village in Somogy county, Hungary.
