= Marcali District =

Marcali District Marcali járás
- Districts of Hungary
- Coat of arms

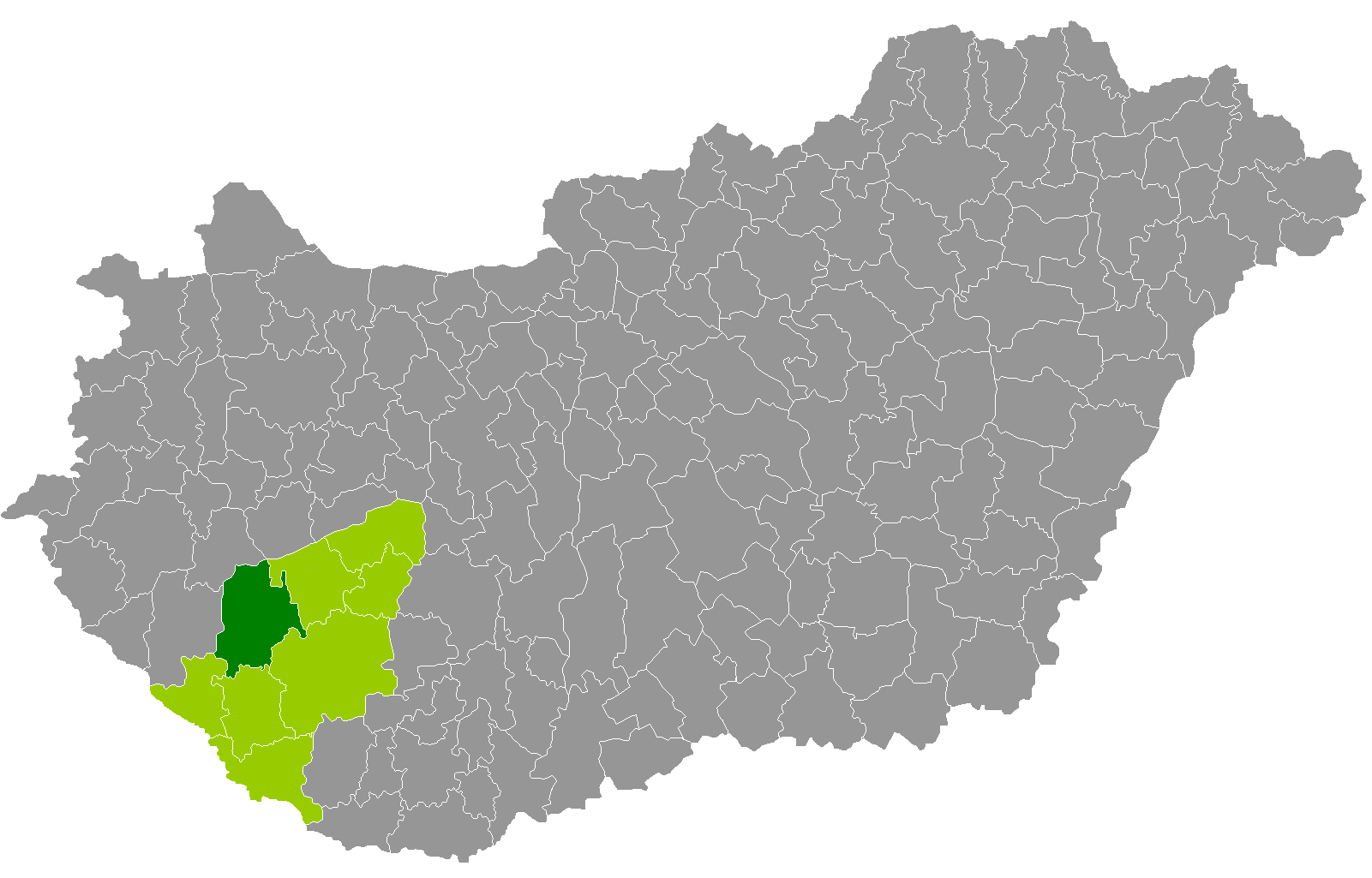
- Marcali District within Hungary and Somogy County.
- Coordinates: 46.58°N 17.41°E
- Country: Hungary
- Region: Southern Transdanubia
- County: Somogy
- District seat: Marcali

Area
  - Total: 904.24 km^{2} (349.13 sq mi)
  - Rank: 2nd in Somogy

Population (2011 census)
  - Total: 34,472
  - Rank: 3rd in Somogy
  - Density: 38/km^{2} (98/sq mi)

Marcali (Hungarian: Marcali járás) is a district in north-western part of Somogy County, in Hungary. Marcali is also the name of the town where the district seat is found. The district is located in the Southern Transdanubia Statistical Region.

== Geography ==
Marcali District borders with Keszthely District (Zala County) to the north, Fonyód District and to the east, Kaposvár District to the southeast, Nagyatád District to the south, Csurgó District to the southwest, Nagykanizsa District (Zala County) to the west. The number of the inhabited places in Marcali District is 37.

== Municipalities ==
The district has 1 town and 36 villages. (ordered by population, as of 1 January 2013)

- Balatonberény (1,091)
- Balatonkeresztúr (1,605)
- Balatonmáriafürdő (691)
- Balatonszentgyörgy (1,614)
- Balatonújlak (503)
- Böhönye (2,380)
- Csákány (227)
- Csömend (303)
- Főnyed (78)
- Gadány (341)
- Hollád (235)
- Hosszúvíz (46)
- Kelevíz (315)
- Kéthely (2,299)
- Libickozma (31)
- **Marcali** (11,733) – district seat
- Mesztegnyő (1,384)
- Nagyszakácsi (423)
- Nemesdéd (739)
- Nemeskisfalud (146)
- Nemesvid (710)
- Nikla (746)
- Pusztakovácsi (868)
- Sávoly (541)
- Somogysámson (752)
- Somogysimonyi (91)
- Somogyszentpál (797)
- Somogyzsitfa (577)
- Szegerdő (215)
- Szenyér (302)
- Szőkedencs (249)
- Tapsony (743)
- Táska (412)
- Tikos (130)
- Varászló (153)
- Vése (758)
- Vörs (459)

The bolded municipality is city.

== See also ==
- List of cities and towns in Hungary
