= Táska =

- Village
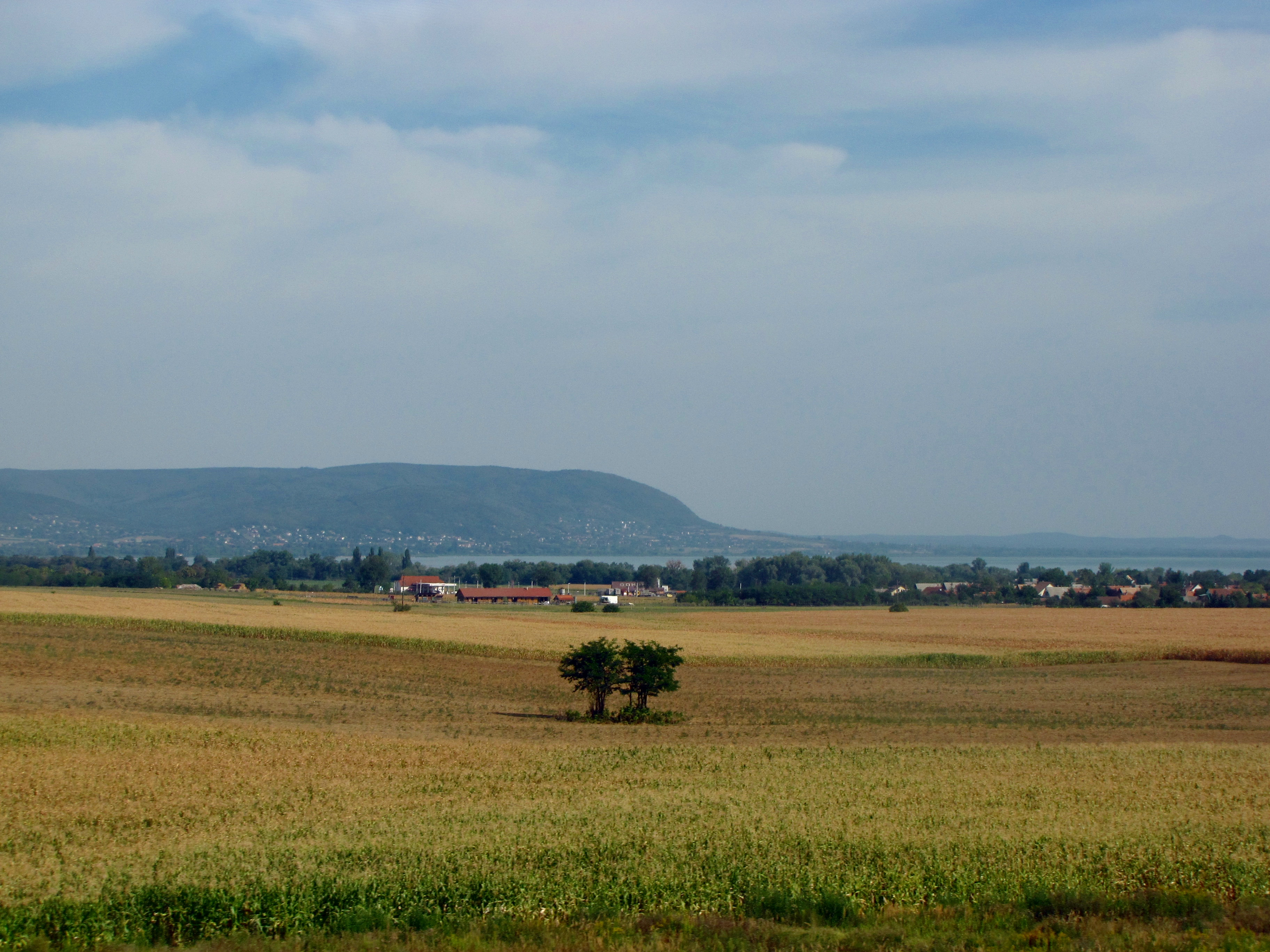
- View of Táska

- Coat of arms

- Location of Somogy county in Hungary

- Location of Táska
- Coordinates: 46.61701°N 17.52468°E
- Country: Hungary
- Region: Southern Transdanubia
- County: Somogy
- District: Marcali
- RC Diocese: Kaposvár

Area
  - Total: 25.98 km^{2} (10.03 sq mi)

Population (2017)
  - Total: 386
  - Density: 14.9/km^{2} (38.5/sq mi)
- Demonym: táskai
- Time zone: UTC+1 (CET)
  - Summer (DST): UTC+2 (CEST)
- Postal code: 8696
- Area code: (+36) 85
- Patron Saint: Martin of Tours
- NUTS 3 code: HU232
- MP: József Attila Móring (KDNP)

Táska is a village in Somogy county, Hungary.
