= Nikla =

- Village
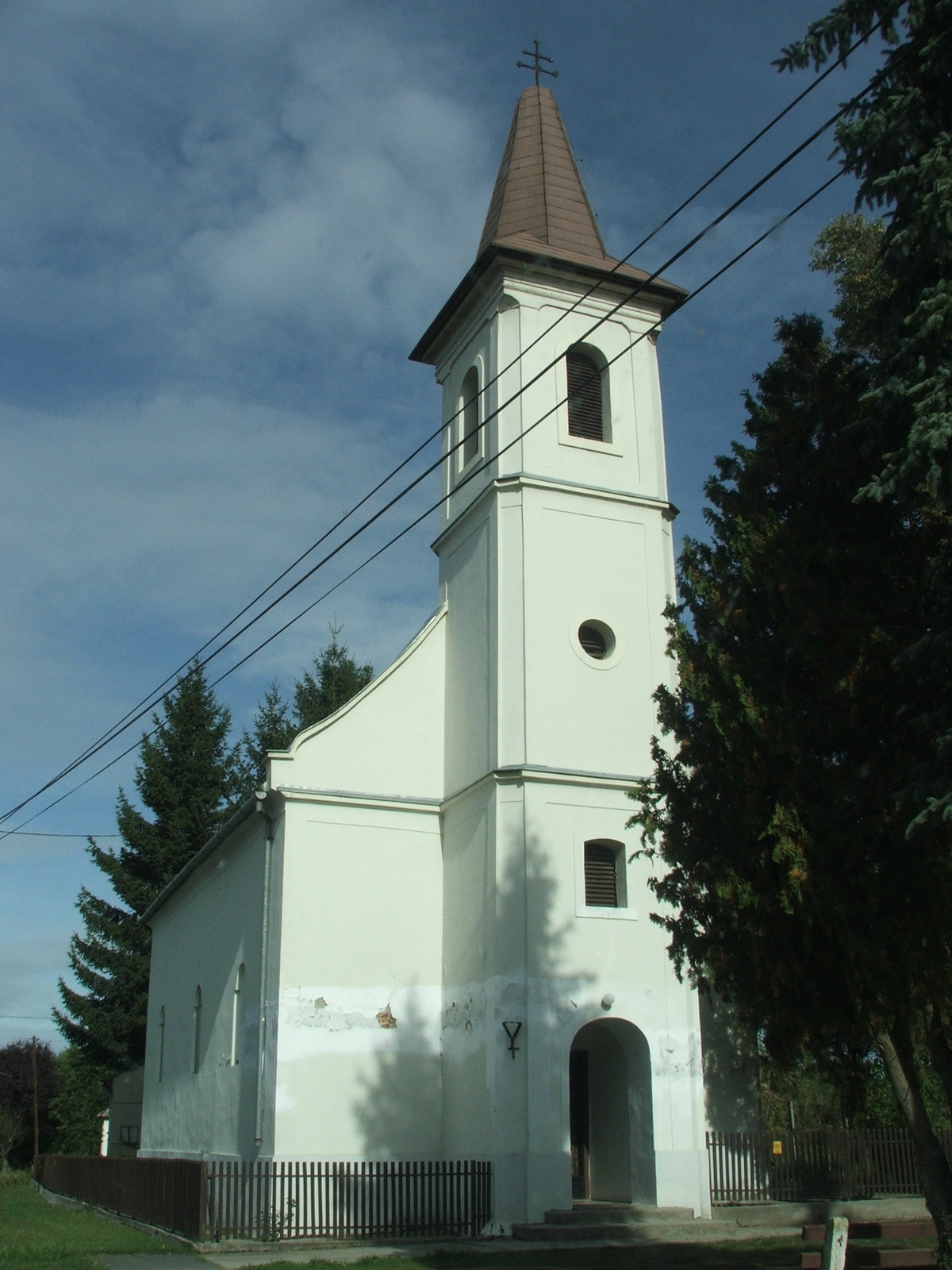
- The church in Nikla

- Coat of arms

- Location of Somogy county in Hungary

- Location of Nikla
- Coordinates: 46.58138°N 17.51634°E
- Country: Hungary
- Region: Southern Transdanubia
- County: Somogy
- District: Marcali
- RC Diocese: Kaposvár

Area
  - Total: 23.35 km^{2} (9.02 sq mi)

Population (2017)
  - Total: 714
  - Density: 30.6/km^{2} (79.2/sq mi)
- Demonym: niklai
- Time zone: UTC+1 (CET)
  - Summer (DST): UTC+2 (CEST)
- Postal code: 8706
- Area code: (+36) 85
- Patron Saint: Nicholas of Myra
- NUTS 3 code: HU232
- MP: József Attila Móring (KDNP)
- Website: Nikla Online

Nikla is a village in Somogy county, Hungary.
