= Nemesvid =

- Village
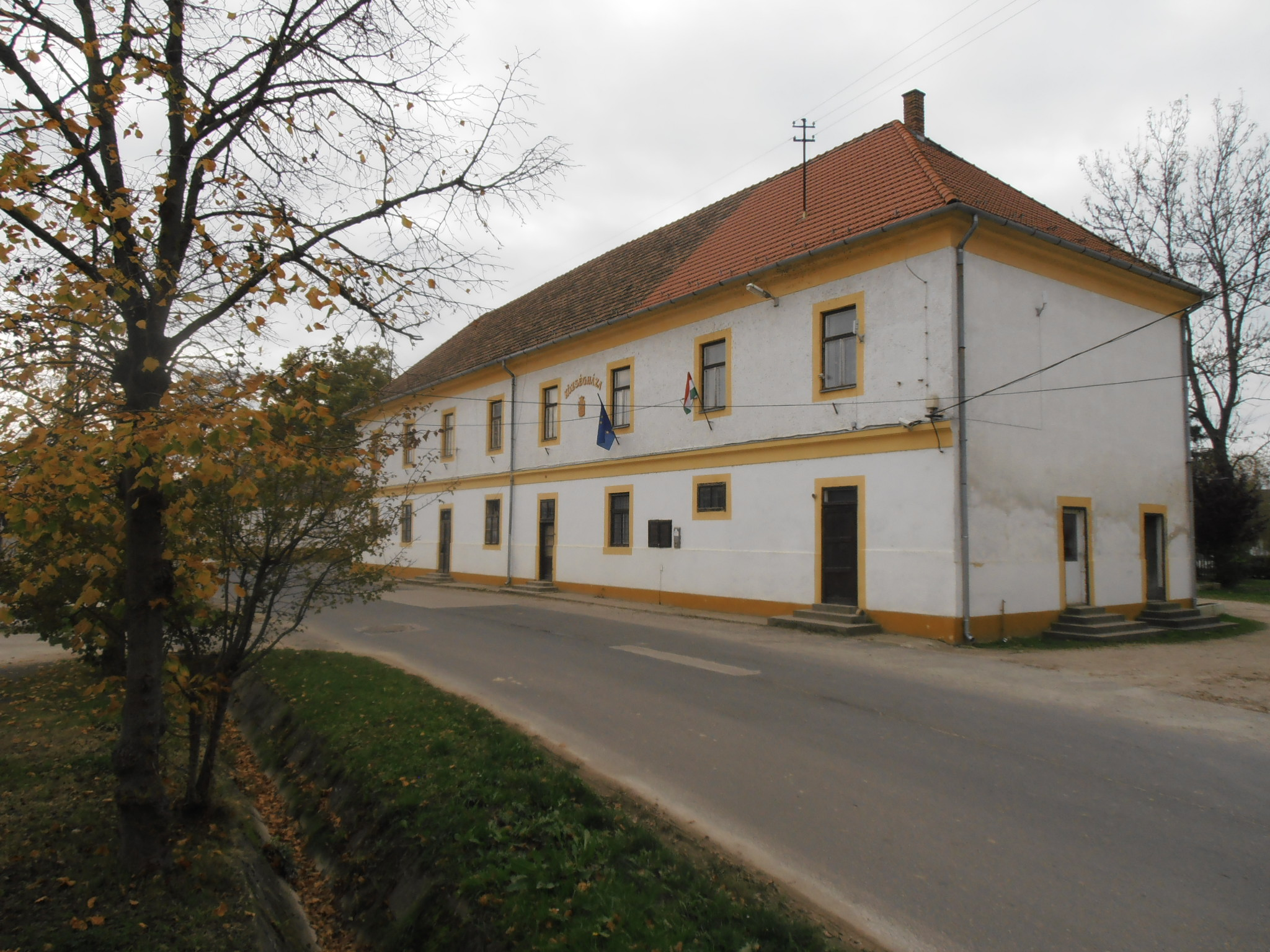
- Building of the local authority in Nemesvid

- Coat of arms

- Location of Somogy county in Hungary

- Location of Nemesvid
- Coordinates: 46.49081°N 17.25133°E
- Country: Hungary
- Region: Southern Transdanubia
- County: Somogy
- District: Marcali
- RC Diocese: Kaposvár

Area
  - Total: 18.38 km^{2} (7.10 sq mi)

Population (2017)
  - Total: 710
  - Density: 39/km^{2} (100/sq mi)
- Demonym(s): vidi, nemesvidi
- Time zone: UTC+1 (CET)
  - Summer (DST): UTC+2 (CEST)
- Postal code: 8738
- Area code: (+36) 85
- NUTS 3 code: HU232
- MP: József Attila Móring (KDNP)
- Website: Nemesvid Online

Nemesvid is a village in Somogy county, Hungary.
