= Szegerdő =

- Village
- Coat of arms

- Location of Somogy county in Hungary

- Location of Szegerdő
- Coordinates: 46.63354°N 17.27603°E
- Country: Hungary
- Region: Southern Transdanubia
- County: Somogy
- District: Marcali
- RC Diocese: Kaposvár

Area
  - Total: 5.46 km^{2} (2.11 sq mi)

Population (2017)
  - Total: 209
  - Density: 38.3/km^{2} (99.1/sq mi)
- Demonym(s): szegerdői, szegerdei
- Time zone: UTC+1 (CET)
  - Summer (DST): UTC+2 (CEST)
- Postal code: 8732
- Area code: (+36) 85
- Motorways: M7
- Distance from Budapest: 178 km (111 mi) Northeast
- NUTS 3 code: HU232
- MP: József Attila Móring (KDNP)
- Website: Szegerdő Online

Szegerdő is a village in Somogy county, Hungary.
