= Somogy County =

County of Hungary

Somogy County Somogy megye
- Counties of Hungary
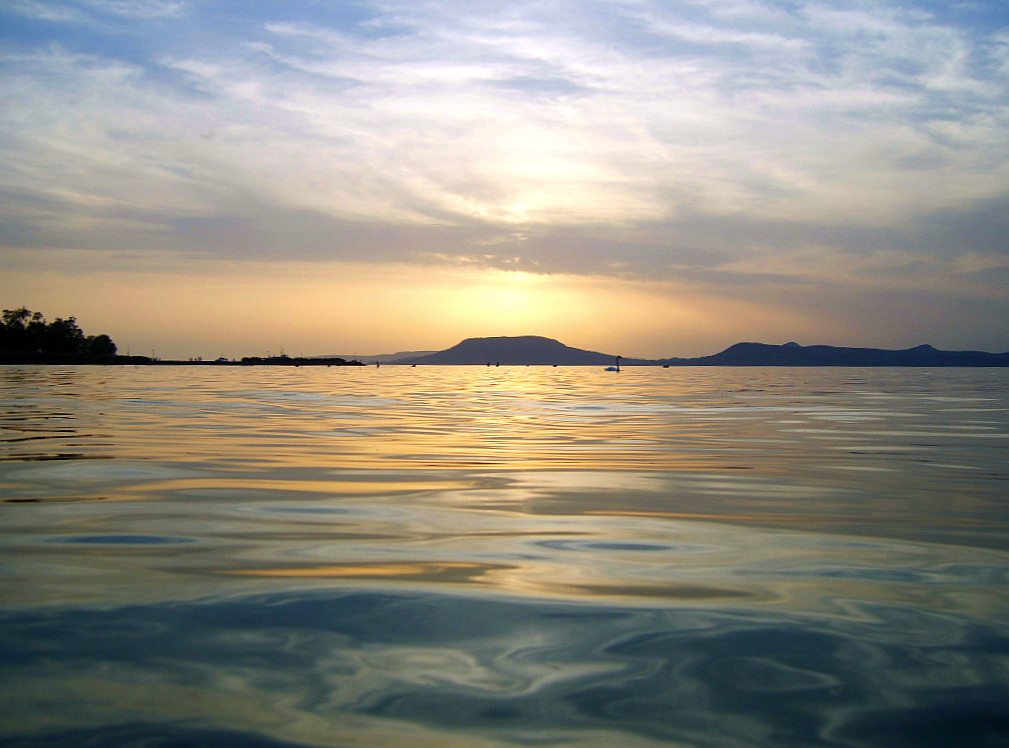
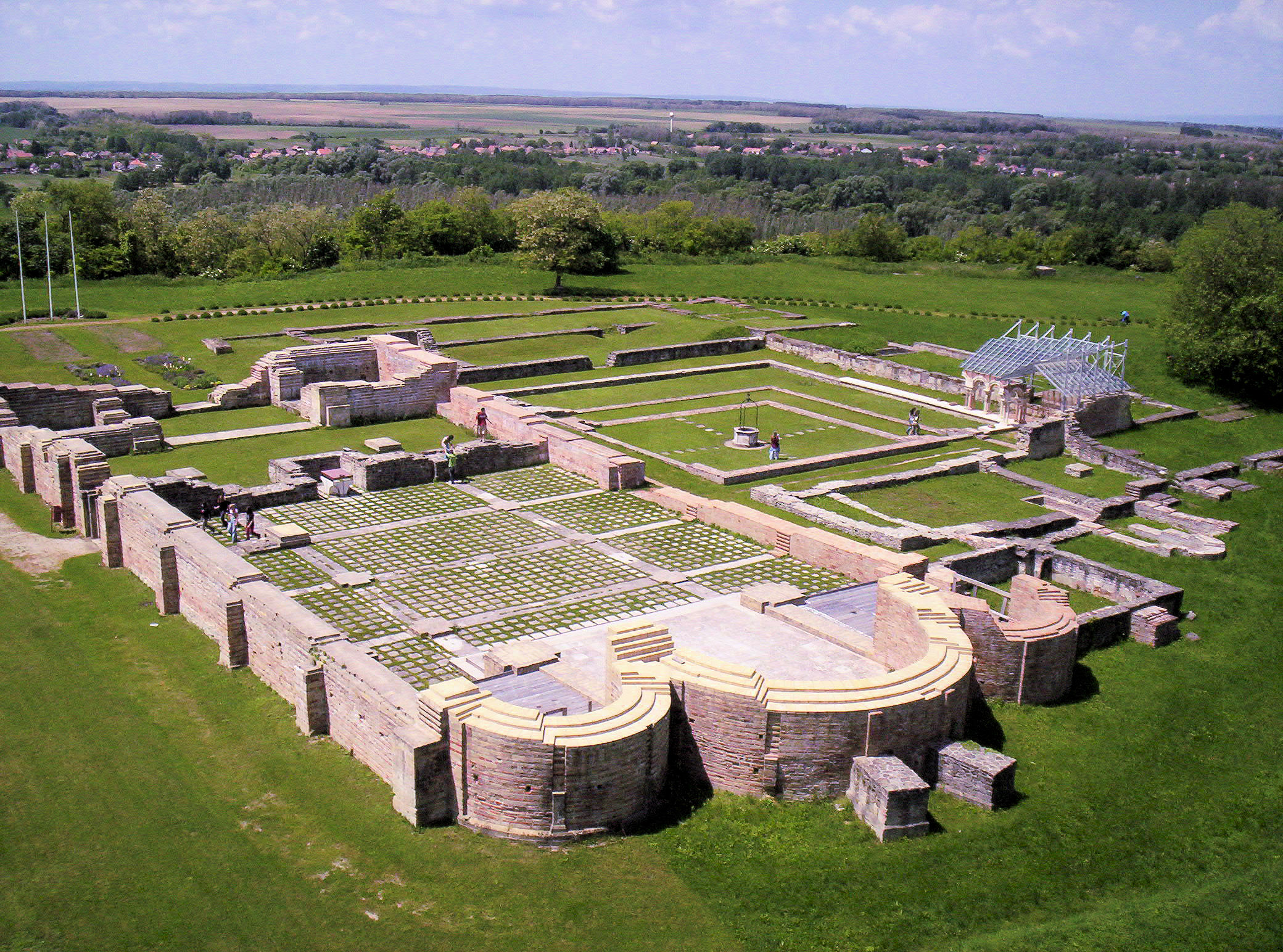
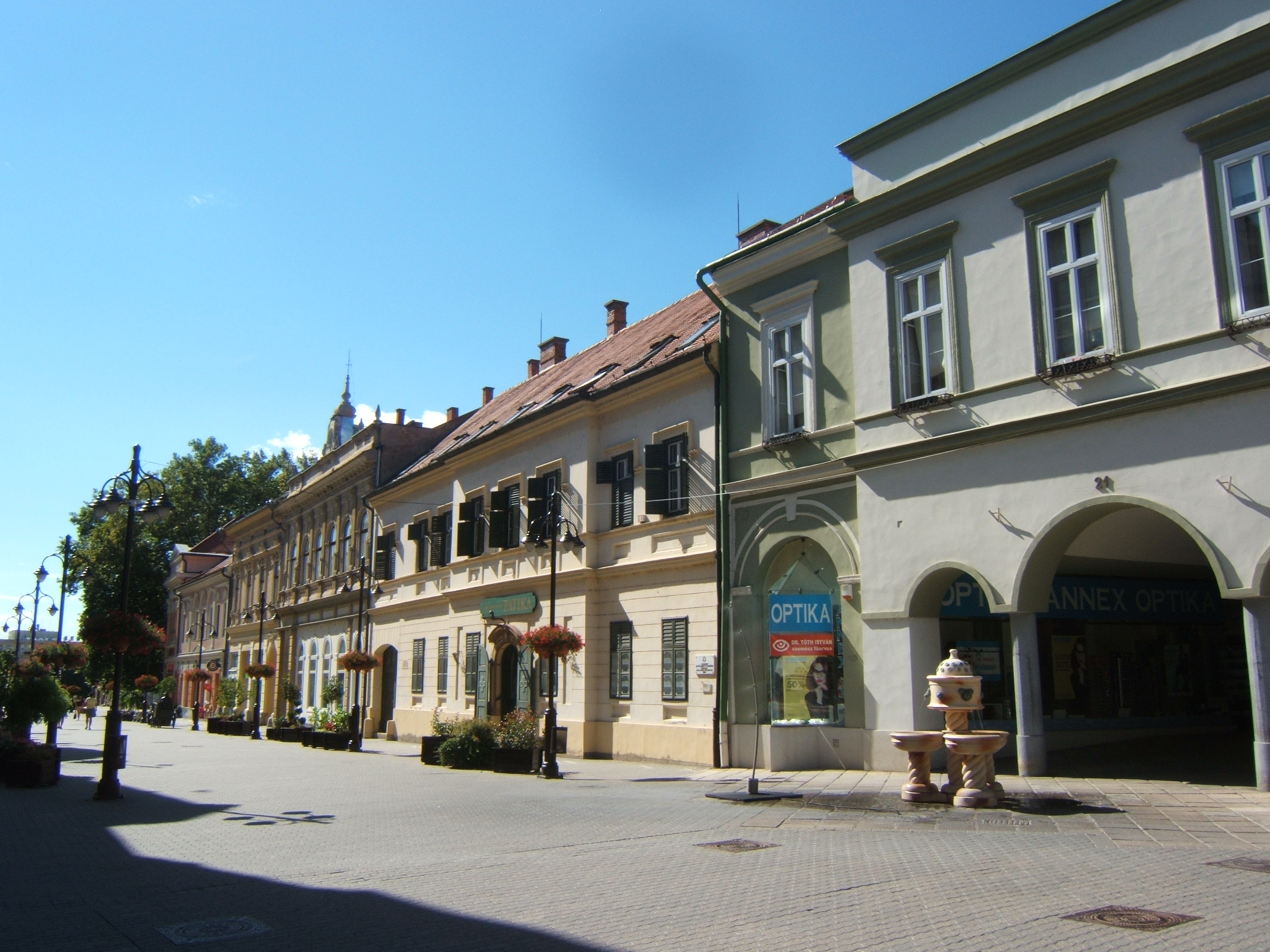
- Descending, from top: Sunset in Lake Balaton, Somogyvár Abbey, and Downtown of Kaposvár

- Flag Coat of arms

- Somogy County within Hungary
- Coordinates: 46°25′N 17°35′E
- Country: Hungary
- Region: Southern Transdanubia
- County seat: Kaposvár
- Districts: 8 districts: Barcs District; Csurgó District; Fonyód District; Kaposvár District; Marcali District; Nagyatád District; Siófok District; Tab District

Government
  - Body: Somogy County Council
  - President of the General Assembly: Norbert Bíró (Fidesz-KDNP)

Area
  - Total: 6,065.07 km^{2} (2,341.74 sq mi)
  - Rank: 5th in Hungary

Population (2018)
  - Total: 303,802
  - Rank: 13th in Hungary
  - Density: 50.0904/km^{2} (129.734/sq mi)

GDP
  - Total: HUF 683 billion €2.195 billion (2016)
- Postal code: 7253 – 729x, 74xx – 75xx, 7918, 7977 – 7979, 86xx – 873x, 884x – 885x
- Area code(s): (+36) 82, 84, 85
- ISO 3166 code: HU-SO
- Website: som-onkorm.hu

Somogy (Hungarian: Somogy megye, pronounced [ˈʃomoɟ]; Croatian: Šomođska županija; Slovene: Šomodska županija, German: Komitat Schomodei) is an administrative county (comitatus or megye) in present Hungary, and also in the former Kingdom of Hungary.

Somogy County lies in south-western Hungary, on the border with Croatia's Koprivnica-Križevci and Virovitica-Podravina counties. It stretches between the river Dráva and the southern shore of Lake Balaton. It shares borders with the Hungarian counties of Zala, Veszprém, Fejér, Tolna, and Baranya. Somogy is the most sparsely populated county in Hungary. The county capital is Kaposvár. Its area is 6,036 km^{2} (2,331 sq mi).

== History ==
Somogy was also the name of a historic administrative county (comitatus) of the Kingdom of Hungary. Its territory, which was slightly larger than that of present Somogy County, is now in south-western Hungary. The capital of that county was also Kaposvár.

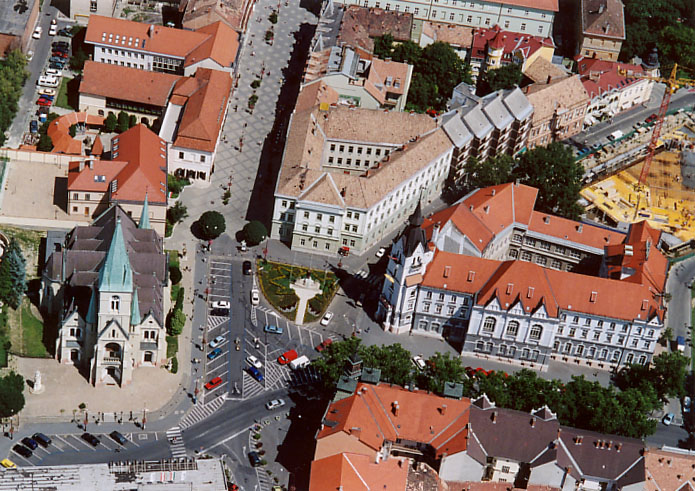
Aerial photograph of Kaposvár.

== Demographics ==
Religion in Somogy County (2022 census – of those who declared their religion (62.0%))
1. Roman Catholic (63.5%)
2. Calvinistic (9.50%)
3. Lutheran (2.60%)
4. Other Christian denomination (3.80%)
5. Other religion (0.50%)
6. Not religious (20.1%)

In 2015, it had a population of 312,084 and the population density was 52/km^{2}.

Year	County population	Change
1949	361,213	n/a
1960	▲368,183 (record)	1.93%
1970	▼357,009	-3.03%
1980	▲360,270	0.91%
1990	▼344,708	-4.32%
2001	▼335,237	-2.75%
2011	▼316,137	-5.70%
2015	▼312,084	-1.29%
2018	▼303,802	-2.72%

=== Ethnicity ===
Besides the Hungarian majority, the main minorities are the Roma (approx. 16,000), Germans (3,000) and Croats (1,500).

Total population (2011 census): 316,137
Ethnic groups (2011 census): Identified themselves: 287,692 persons:

- Hungarians: 265,464 (92,27%)
- Romani: 16,167 (5,62%)
- Germans: 3,039 (1,06%)
- Others and indefinable: 3,022 (1,05%)

Approx. 46,000 persons in Somogy County did not declare their ethnic group at the 2011 census.

=== Religion ===
Religious adherence in the county according to 2011 census:

- Catholic – 168,307 (Roman Catholic – 167,719; Greek Catholic – 546);
- Reformed – 21,176;
- Evangelical – 5,807;
- other religions – 3,829;
- Non-religious – 35,503;
- Atheism – 3,056;
- Undeclared – 78,459.

== Regional structure ==
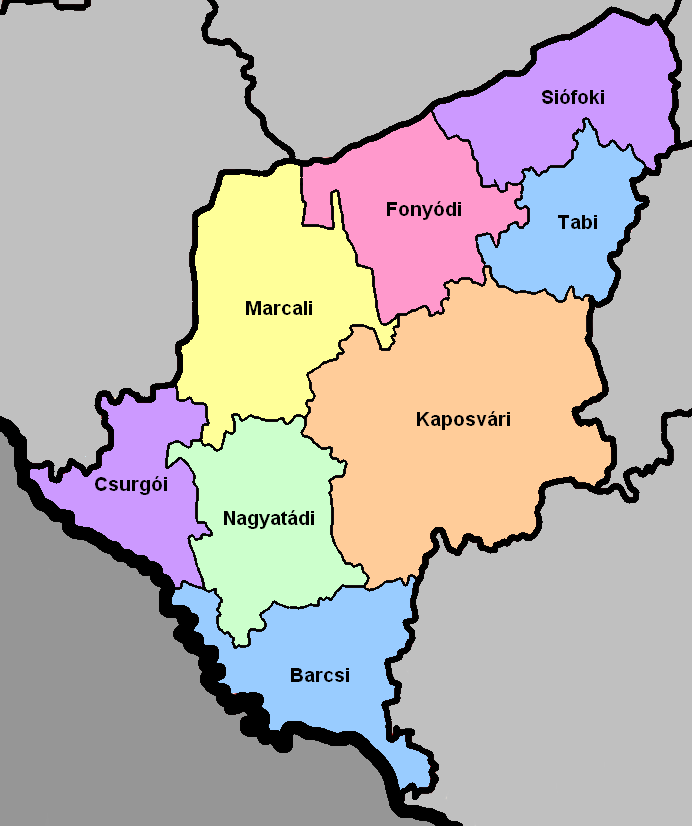
Districts of Somogy County

No.	English and Hungarian names	Area (km^{2})	Population (2011)	Density (pop./km^{2})	Seat	No. of municipalities
1	Barcs District; Barcsi járás	696.47	23,793	34	Barcs	26
2	Csurgó District; Csurgói járás	496.19	16,862	34	Csurgó	18
3	Fonyód District; Fonyódi járás	645.44	33,785	52	Fonyód	21
4	Kaposvár District; Kaposvári járás	1,591.36	118,496	74	Kaposvár	78
5	Marcali District; Marcali járás	904.24	34,472	38	Marcali	37
6	Nagyatád District; Nagyatádi járás	647.07	26,003	40	Nagyatád	18
7	Siófok District; Siófoki járás	657.05	51,099	78	Siófok	24
8	Tab District; Tabi járás	427.24	12,797	30	Tab	24
Somogy County		6,065.07	312,084	52	Kaposvár	245

== Politics ==
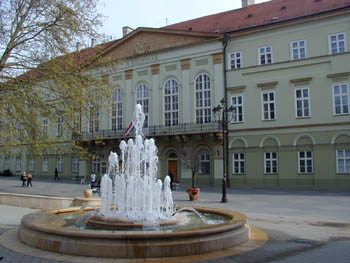
Somogy County Hall

The Somogy County Council, elected at the 2019 local government elections, is made up of 15 counselors, with the following party composition:

Party	Seats	Current County Assembly
Fidesz-KDNP	9	
Movement for a Better Hungary (Jobbik)	3	
Association for Somogy (Somogyért)	2	
Momentum Movement (MM)	1	
Democratic Coalition (DK)	1	

=== Presidents of the General Assembly ===
List of presidents since 1990
István Gyenesei (Independent)	1990–1994
István Kolber (MSZP)	1994–1998
István Gyenesei (Somogyért)	1998–2006
Attila Gelencsér (Fidesz-KDNP)	2006–2014
Norbert Bíró (Fidesz-KDNP)	2014–

== Municipalities ==
Somogy County has 1 urban county, 15 towns, 2 large villages and 227 villages.

City with county rights

(ordered by population, as of 2011 census)

- Kaposvár (66,245) – county seat

Towns

- Siófok (25,045)
- Marcali (11,736)
- Barcs (11,420)
- Nagyatád (11,032)
- Balatonboglár (5,736)
- Balatonlelle (5,217)
- Csurgó (5,214)
- Fonyód (4,793)
- Tab (4,533)
- Nagybajom (3,330)
- Lengyeltóti (3,050)
- Kadarkút (2,653)
- Zamárdi (2,386)
- Balatonföldvár (2,207)
- Igal (1,270)

Villages

- Alsóbogát
- Andocs
- Ádánd
- Babócsa
- Bábonymegyer
- Bakháza
- Balatonberény
- Balatonendréd
- Balatonfenyves
- Balatonkeresztúr
- Balatonmáriafürdő
- Balatonőszöd
- Balatonszabadi
- Balatonszárszó
- Balatonszemes
- Balatonszentgyörgy
- Balatonújlak
- Balatonvilágos
- Bárdudvarnok
- Baté
- Bálványos
- Bedegkér
- Bélavár
- Beleg
- Berzence
- Bodrog
- Bolhás
- Bolhó
- Bonnya
- Böhönye
- Bőszénfa
- Buzsák
- Büssü
- Csákány
- Cserénfa
- Csokonyavisonta
- Csoma
- Csömend
- Csököly
- Csombárd
- Csurgónagymarton
- Darány
- Drávagárdony
- Drávatamási
- Ecseny
- Edde
- Felsőmocsolád
- Fiad
- Fonó
- Főnyed
- Gadács
- Gadány
- Gamás
- Gálosfa
- Gige
- Gölle
- Gyékényes
- Görgeteg
- Gyugy
- Hajmás
- Hács
- Háromfa
- Hedrehely
- Hencse
- Heresznye
- Hetes
- Hollád
- Homokszentgyörgy
- Hosszúvíz
- Iharos
- Iharosberény
- Inke
- Istvándi
- Jákó
- Juta
- Kapoly
- Kaposfő
- Kaposgyarmat
- Kaposhomok
- Kaposkeresztúr
- Kaposmérő
- Kaposszerdahely
- Kaposújlak
- Karád
- Kastélyosdombó
- Kaszó
- Kazsok
- Kálmáncsa
- Kánya
- Kára
- Kelevíz
- Kercseliget
- Kereki
- Kéthely
- Kisasszond
- Kisbajom
- Kisberény
- Kisbárapáti
- Kisgyalán
- Kiskorpád
- Komlósd
- Kötcse
- Kőröshegy
- Kőkút
- Kutas
- Lábod
- Lad
- Lakócsa
- Látrány
- Libickozma
- Lulla
- Magyaratád
- Magyaregres
- Mernye
- Mesztegnyő
- Mezőcsokonya
- Mike
- Miklósi
- Mosdós
- Nagyberki
- Nagyberény
- Nagycsepely
- Nagykorpád
- Nagyszakácsi
- Nágocs
- Nemesdéd
- Nemeskisfalud
- Nemesvid
- Nikla
- Nyim
- Orci
- Ordacsehi
- Osztopán
- Öreglak
- Ötvöskónyi
- Őrtilos
- Pamuk
- Patalom
- Patca
- Patosfa
- Pálmajor
- Péterhida
- Pogányszentpéter
- Polány
- Porrog
- Porrogszentkirály
- Porrogszentpál
- Potony
- Pusztakovácsi
- Pusztaszemes
- Ráksi
- Rinyabesenyő
- Rinyakovácsi
- Rinyaszentkirály
- Rinyaújlak
- Rinyaújnép
- Ságvár
- Sántos
- Sávoly
- Segesd
- Sérsekszőlős
- Siójut
- Som
- Somodor
- Somogyacsa
- Somogyaracs
- Somogyaszaló
- Somogybabod
- Somogybükkösd
- Somogycsicsó
- Somogydöröcske
- Somogyegres
- Somogyfajsz
- Somogygeszti
- Somogyjád
- Somogymeggyes
- Somogysimonyi
- Somogyszentpál
- Somogyszil
- Somogyszob
- Somogysámson
- Somogysárd
- Somogytúr
- Somogyudvarhely
- Somogyvámos
- Somogyvár
- Somogyzsitfa
- Szabadi
- Szabás
- Szántód
- Szegerdő
- Szenna
- Szenta
- Szentbalázs
- Szentborbás
- Szentgáloskér
- Szenyér
- Szilvásszentmárton
- Szorosad
- Szólád
- Szőkedencs
- Szőlősgyörök
- Szulok
- Tapsony
- Tarany
- Taszár
- Táska
- Tengőd
- Teleki
- Tikos
- Torvaj
- Tótújfalu
- Törökkoppány
- Újvárfalva
- Várda
- Varászló
- Vése
- Visnye
- Visz
- Vízvár
- Vörs
- Zala
- Zákány
- Zics
- Zimány
- Zselickisfalud
- Zselickislak
- Zselicszentpál

municipalities are large villages.

== See also ==
- List of tourist attractions in Somogy County
- Slovenes in Somogy

== Gallery ==
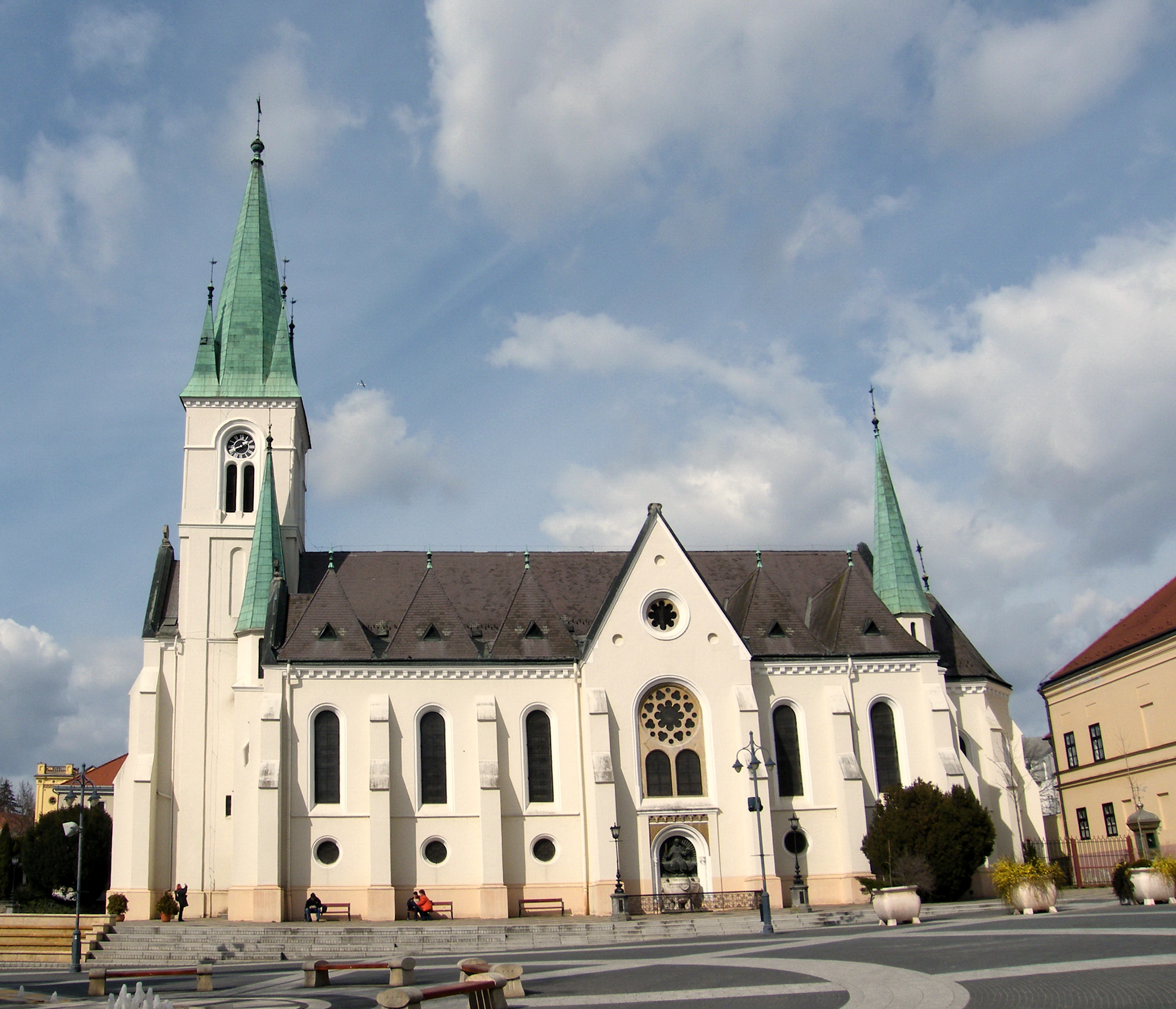
Kaposvár, the capital of the county

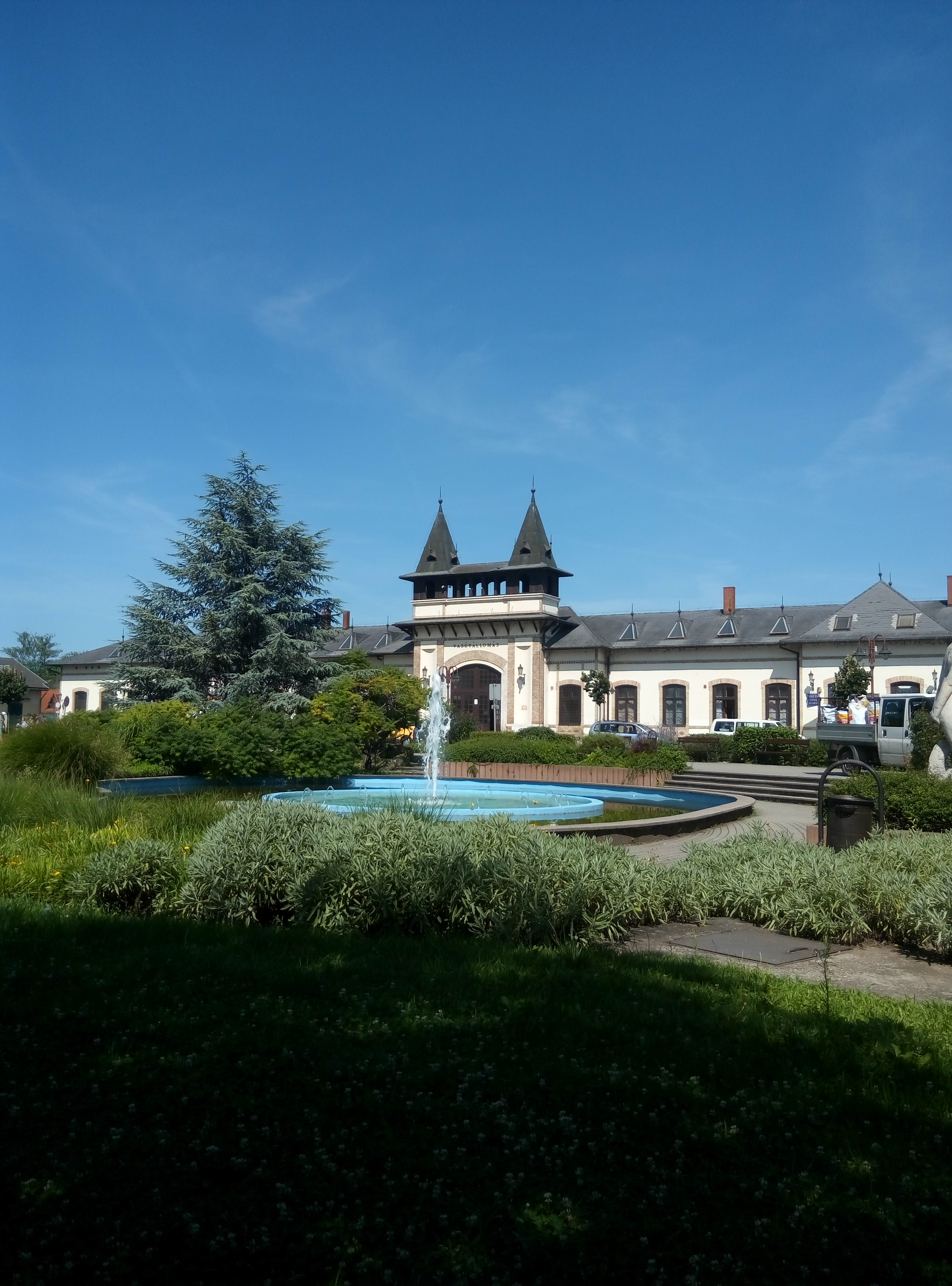
Siófok, the Capital of Balaton

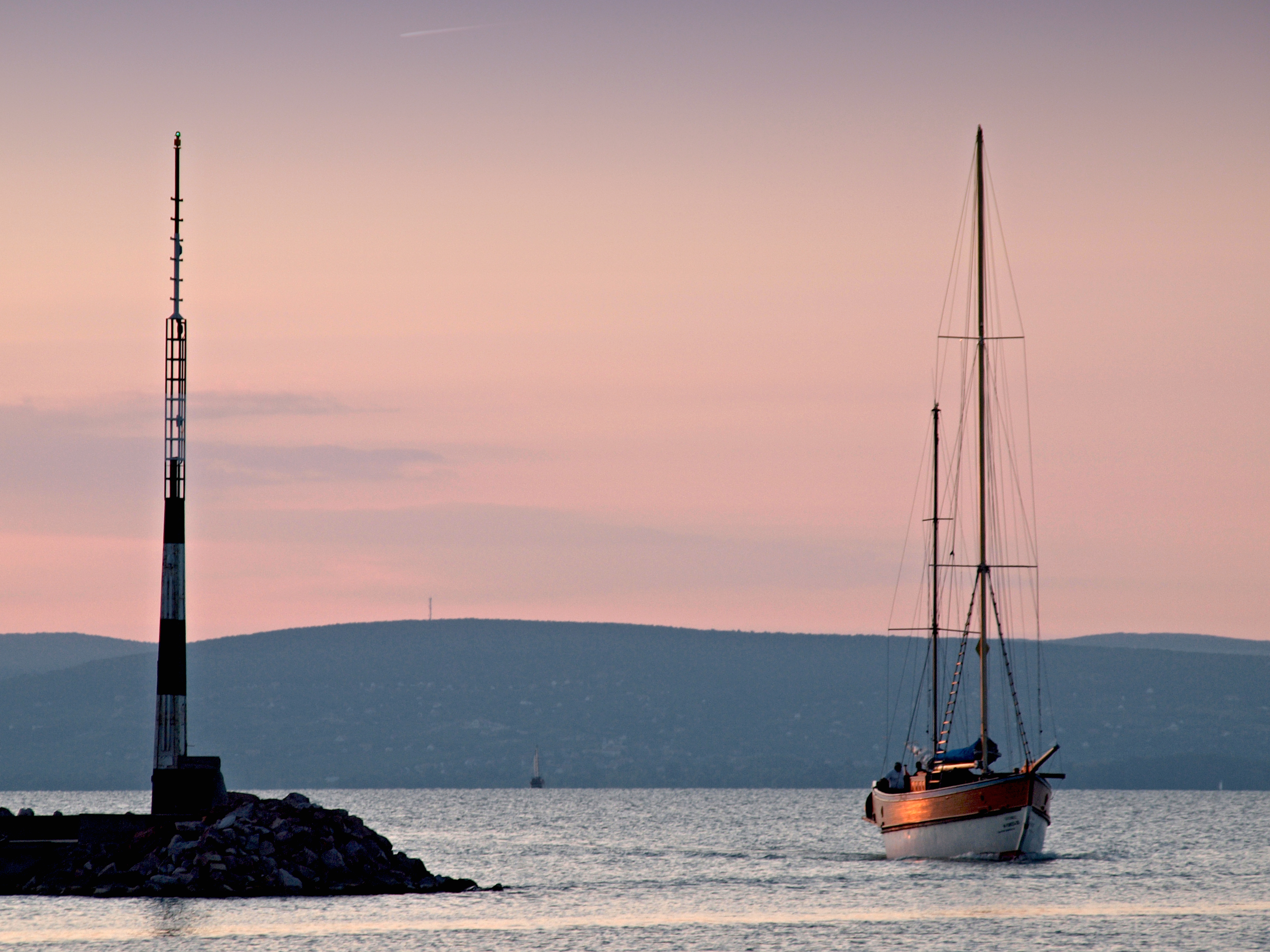
Lake Balaton near Balatonföldvár

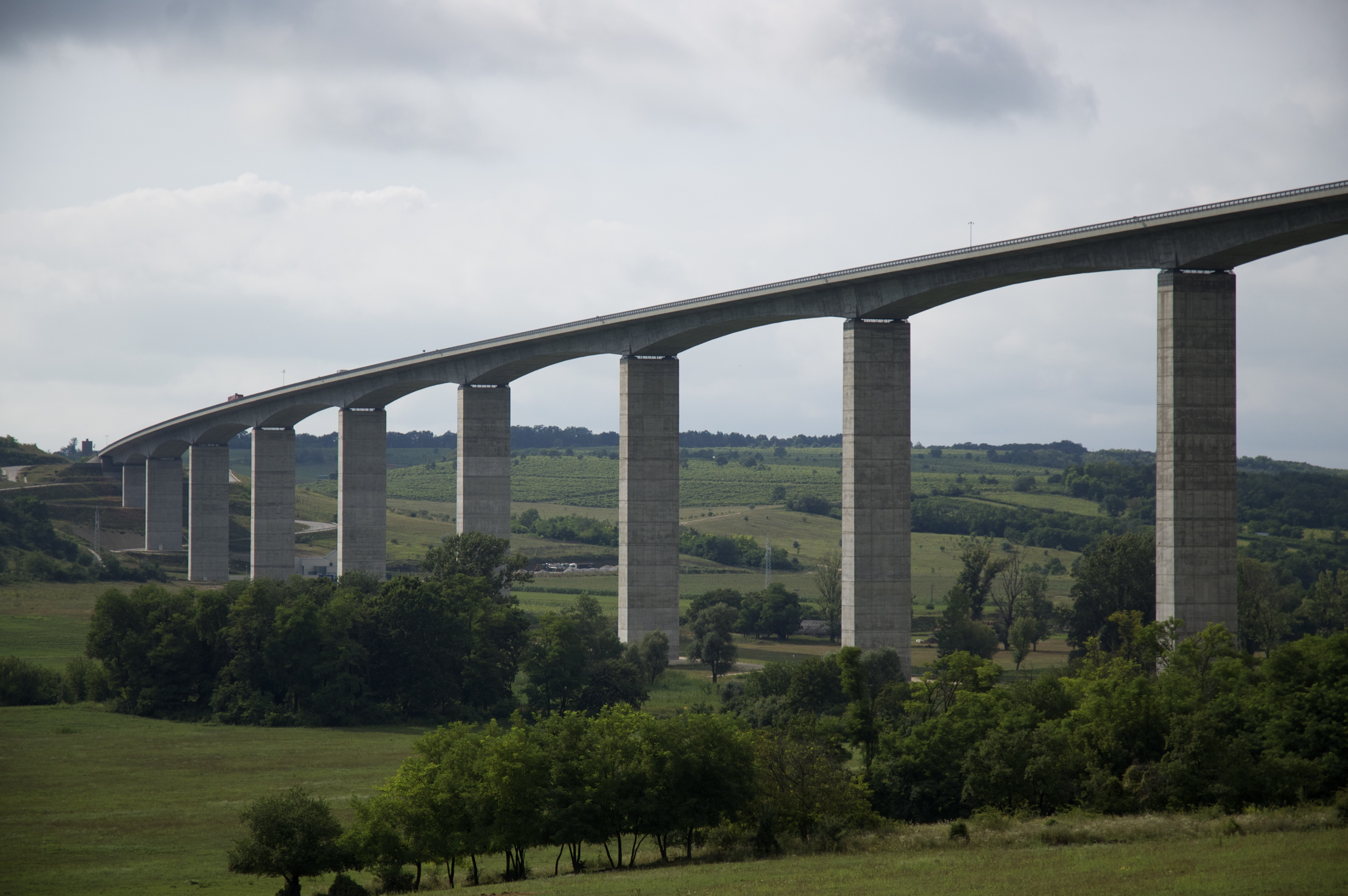
Kőröshegy Viaduct in Kőröshegy

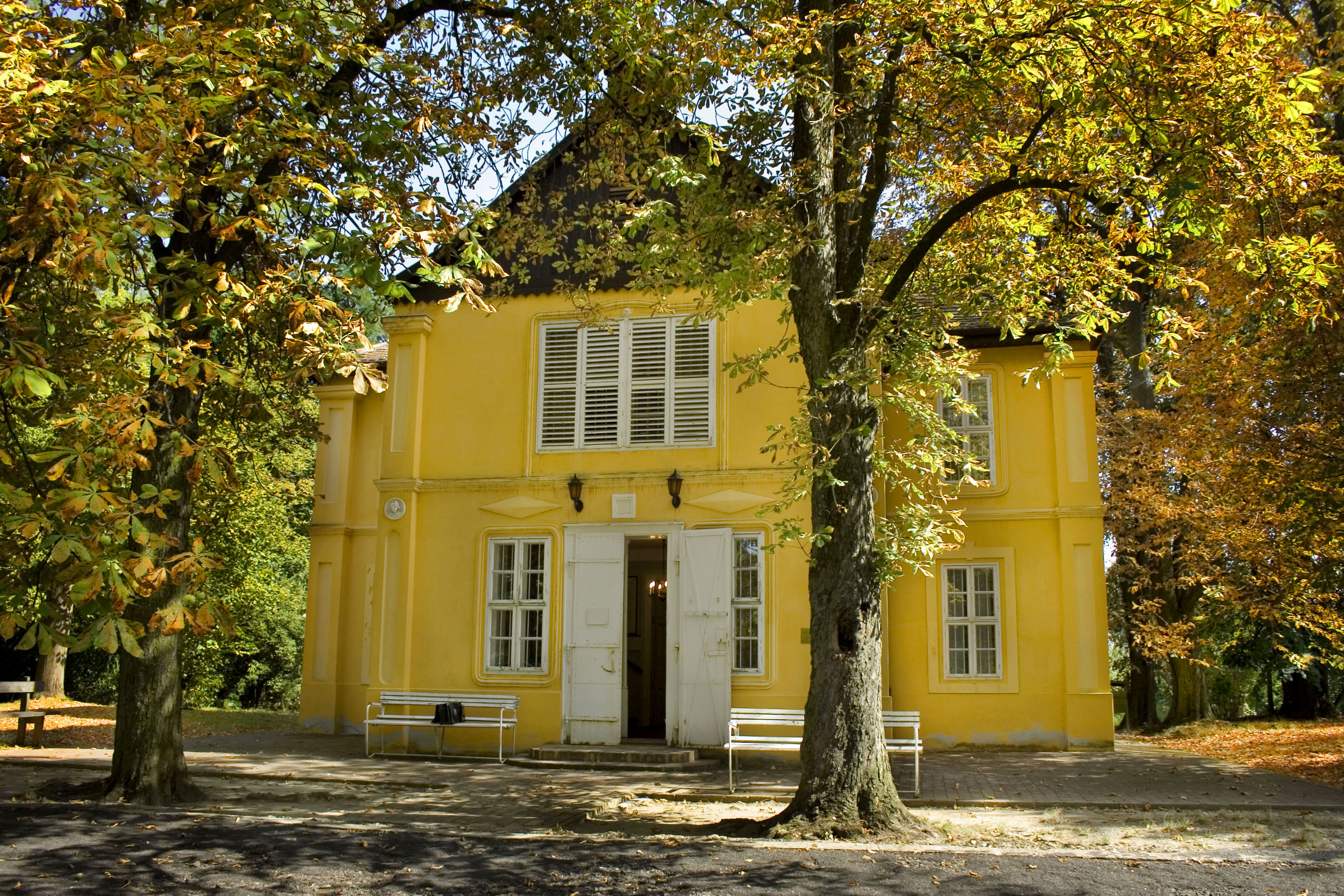
House of József Rippl-Rónai

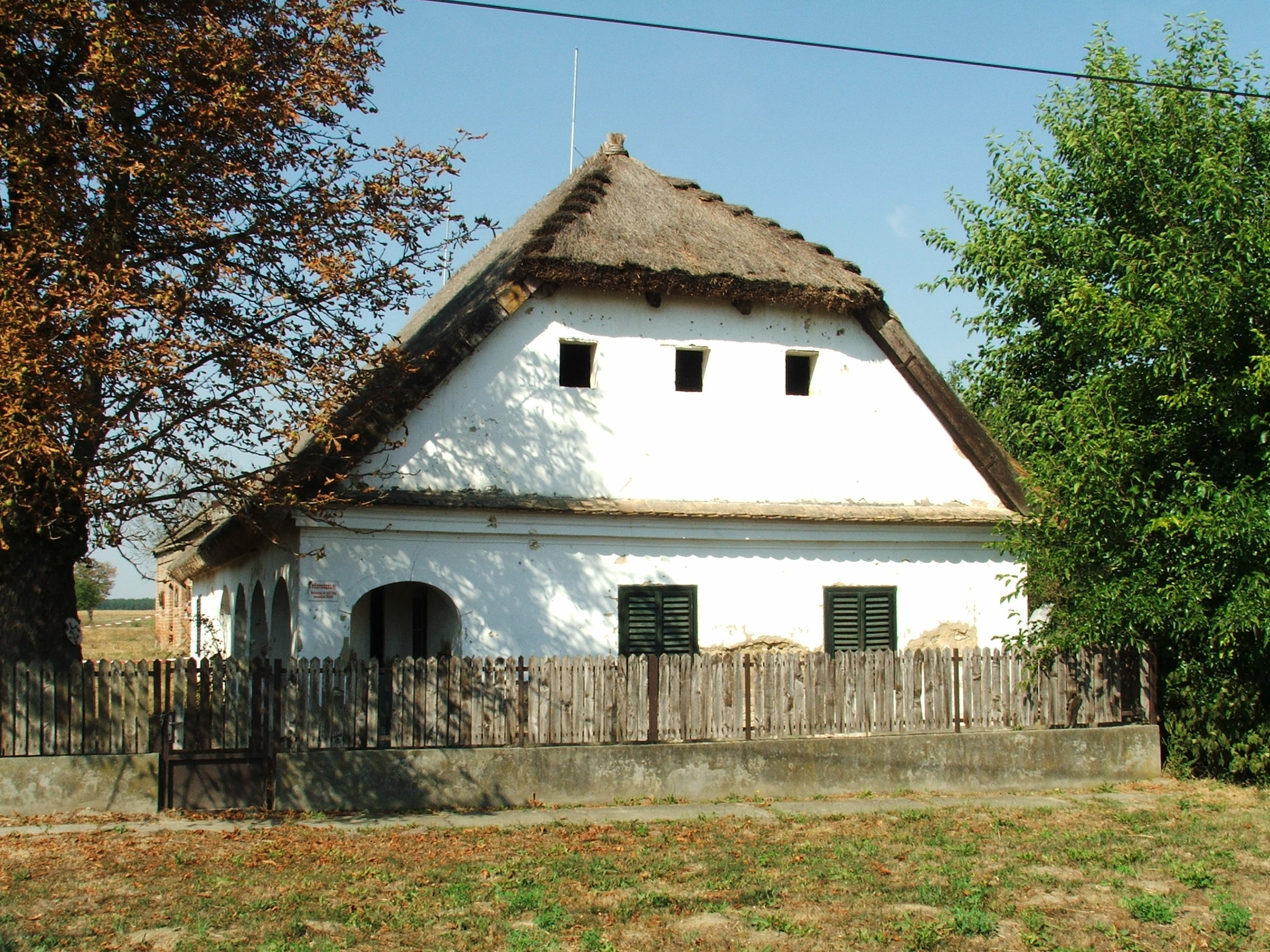
Traditional Hungarian house in Istvándi

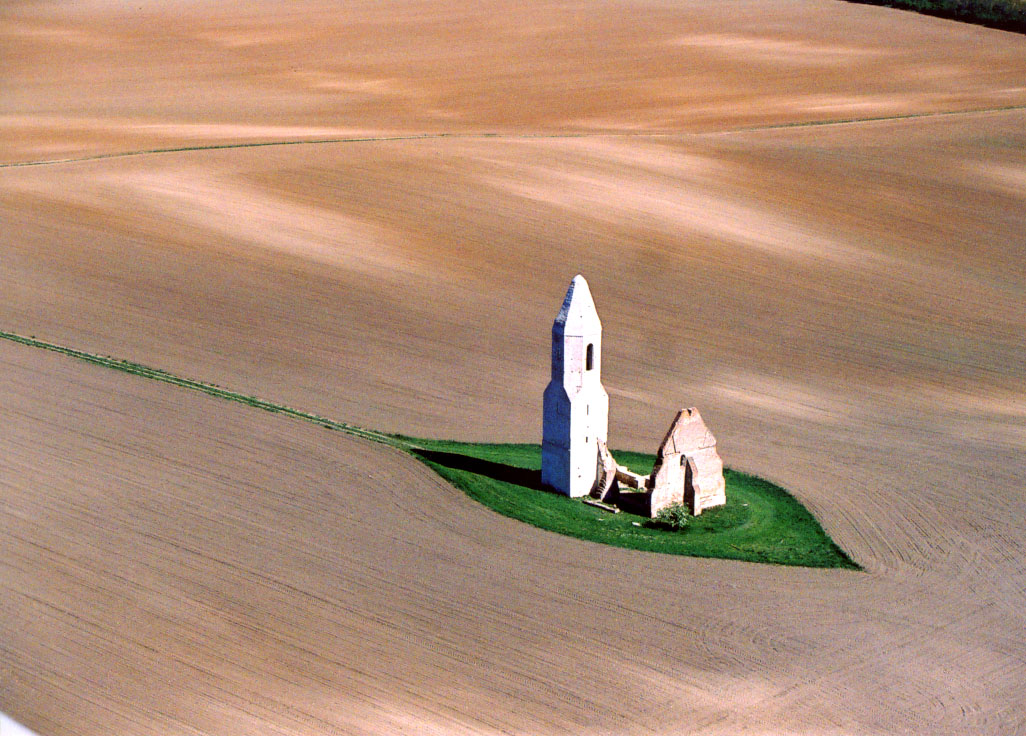
Pusztatemplom of the Árpád era near Somogyvámos

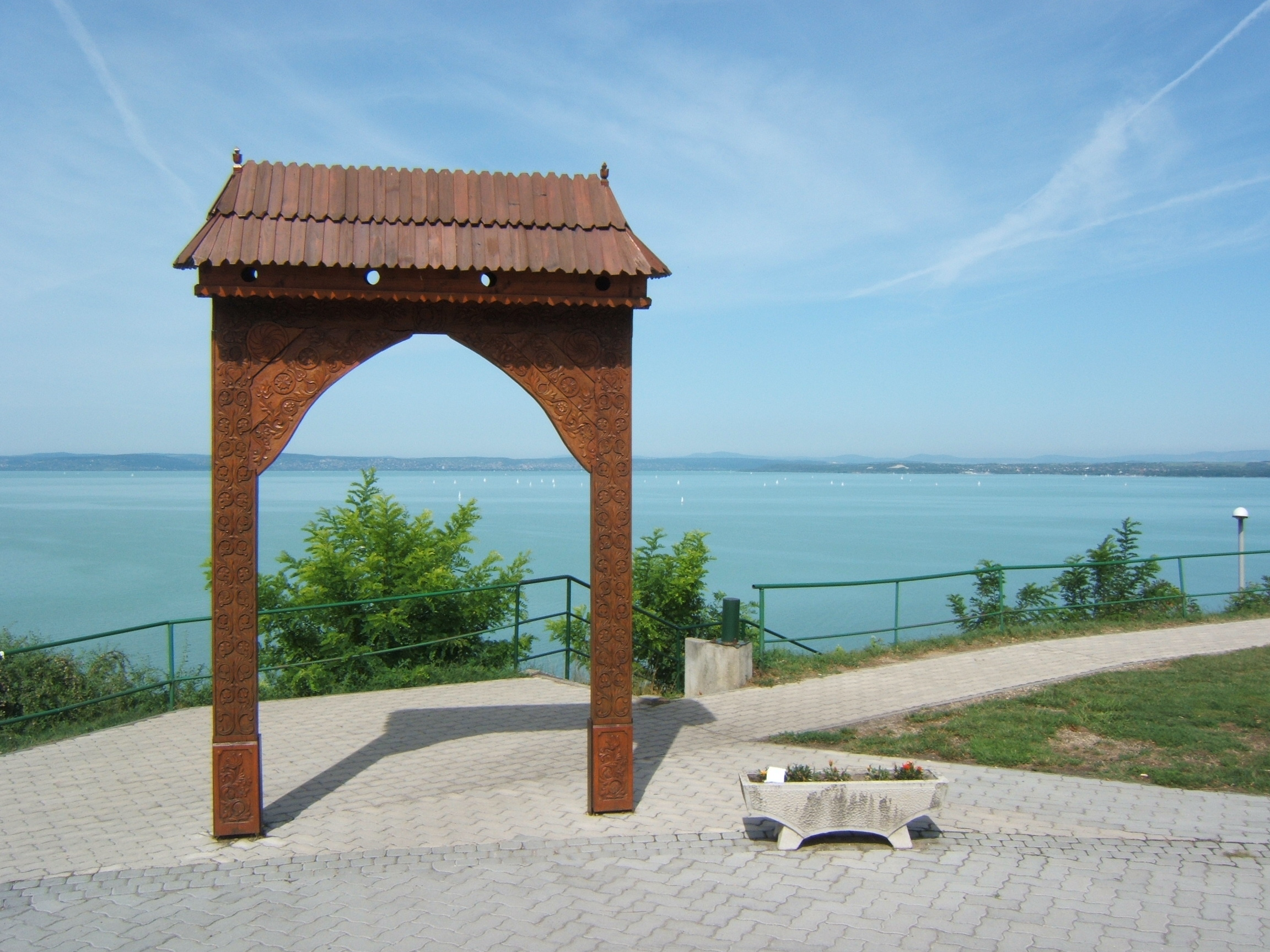
Lake Balaton at Balatonvilágos

== International relations ==
Somogy County has a partnership relationship with:

- Gansu Municipality, China
