= József Attila Móring =

Hungarian educator and politician

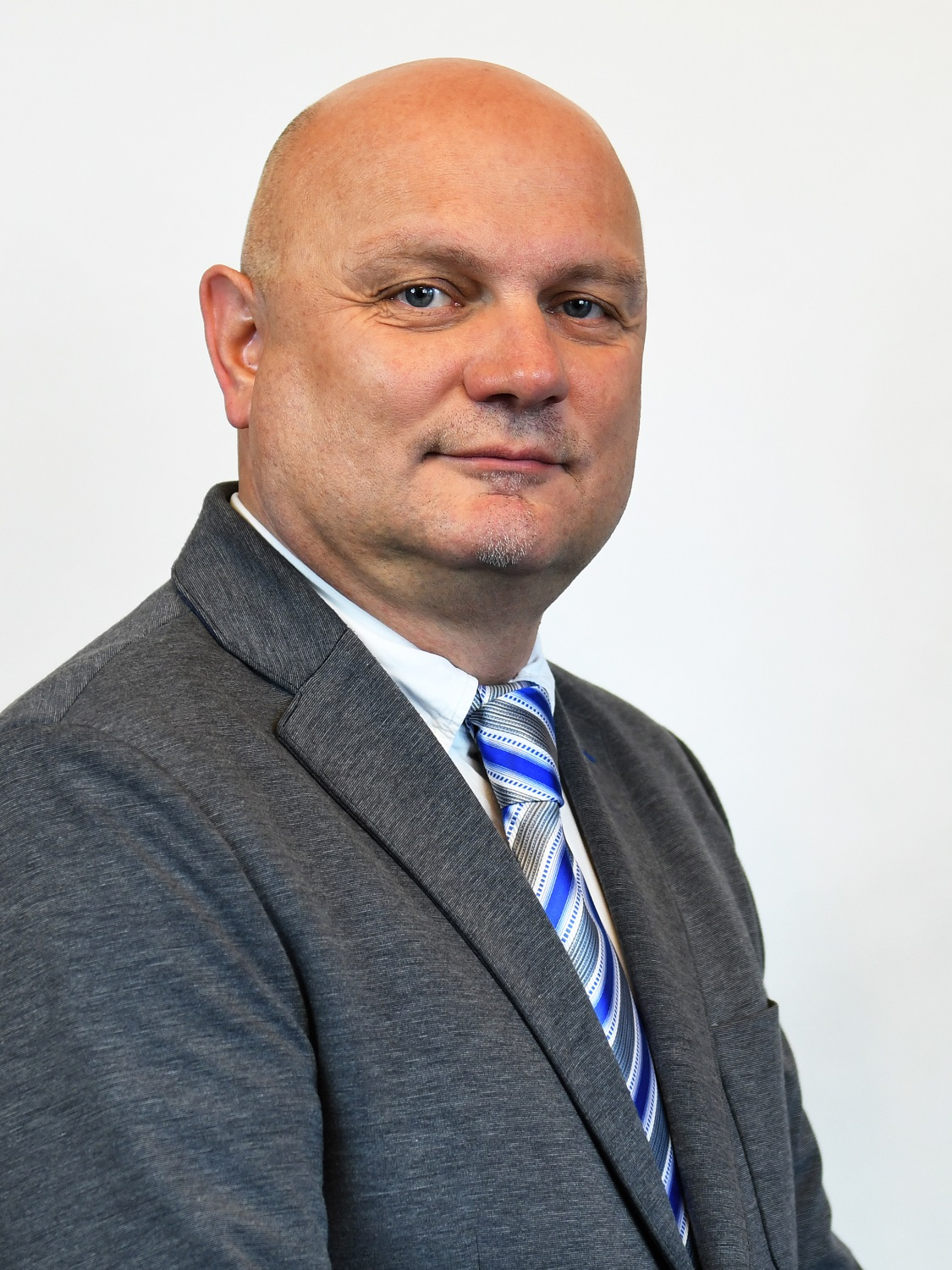

Member of the National Assembly
- Incumbent
- Assumed office 23 December 2002

Personal details
- Born: October 8, 1968 (age 57) Kaposvár, Hungary
- Party: Fidesz (1992-2006); KDNP (2006-)
- Spouse: Mihály Margit
- Children: Máté Koppány; Álmos Botond
- Profession: educator, politician

József Attila Móring (born 8 October 1968) is a Hungarian educator and politician, member of the National Assembly (MP) for Balatonboglár (Somogy County Constituency IV) from 2006 to 2014, and for Marcali (Somogy County 3rd constituency) since 2014. He was also Member of Parliament from his party, the Fidesz's Somogy County Regional List between 2002 and 2004.

== Political career ==
He served as mayor of Somogyvár from 1998 to 2014. He joined Fidesz in December 1992. He led the Somogyvár branch of his party until 2002. He became a Member of Parliament in December 2002, replacing Károly Szita, who resigned from his parliamentary seat. Móring worked in the Committee on Human Rights, Minorities and Religious Affairs between 2003 and 2006. He was elected MP for Balatonboglár during the 2006 parliamentary election as a candidate of the Fidesz–KDNP alliance. He joined the KDNP parliamentary group. He was a member of the Immunity, Incompatibility and Credentials Committee between 2006 and 2010. He was elected one of the recorders of the National Assembly in May 2006.

Móring was re-elected MP for Balatonboglár in the 2010 parliamentary election. He became a member of the National Security Committee in May 2010. He was Vice Chairman of that ad hoc committee which intended to investigate the Civil Guard Association for a Better Future's activity in Gyöngyöspata in early 2011. After the 2014 parliamentary election, which adopted a new election law and redrawn constituencies, Móring was elected MP for Marcali (Somogy County 3rd constituency). He was re-elected in 2018 and 2022. Following the 2022 parliamentary election, Minister Tibor Navracsics appointed him government commissioner responsible for the economic development of Southern Transdanubia in May 2022.
