= Bálványos (Hungary) =

- Village
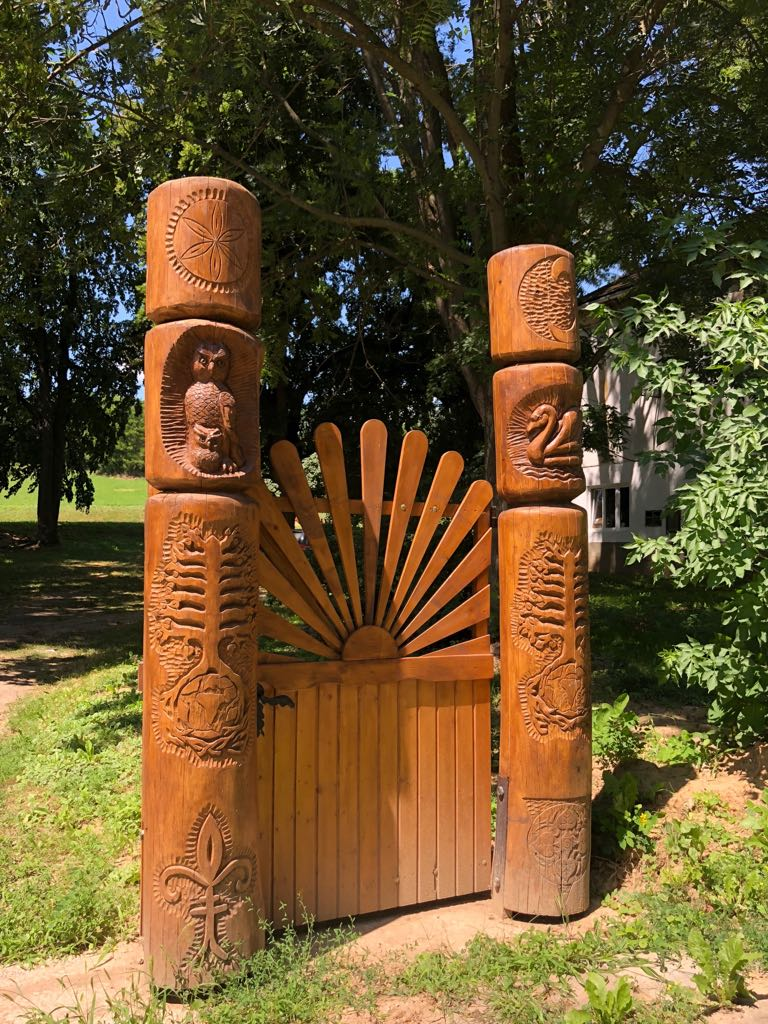
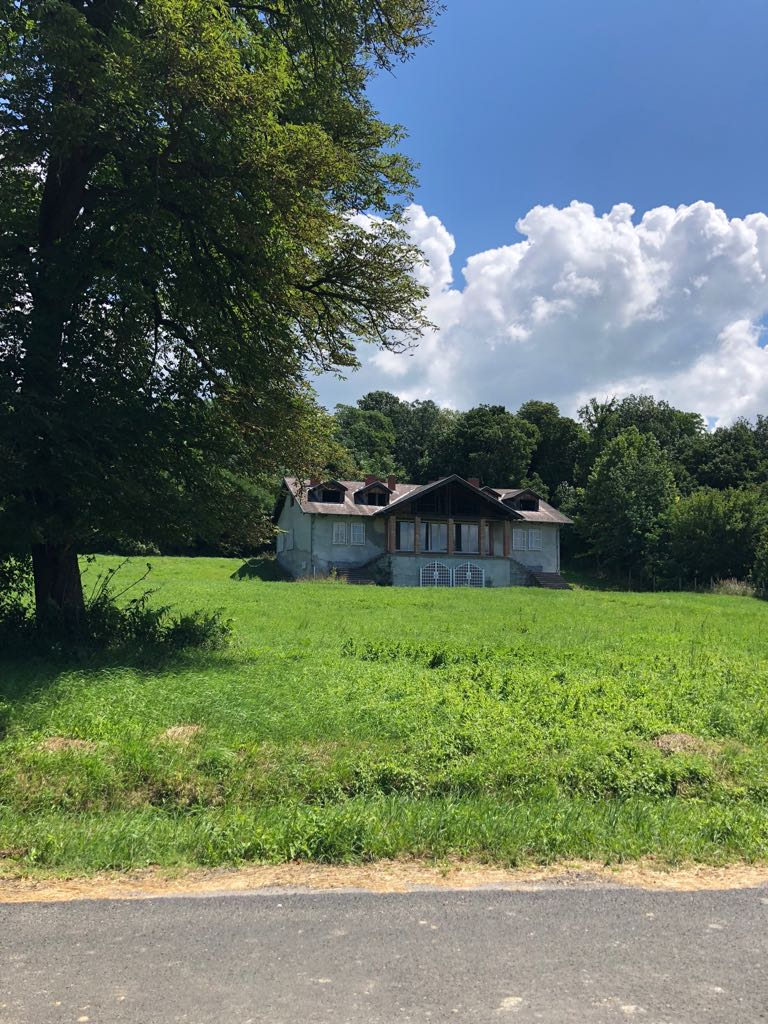
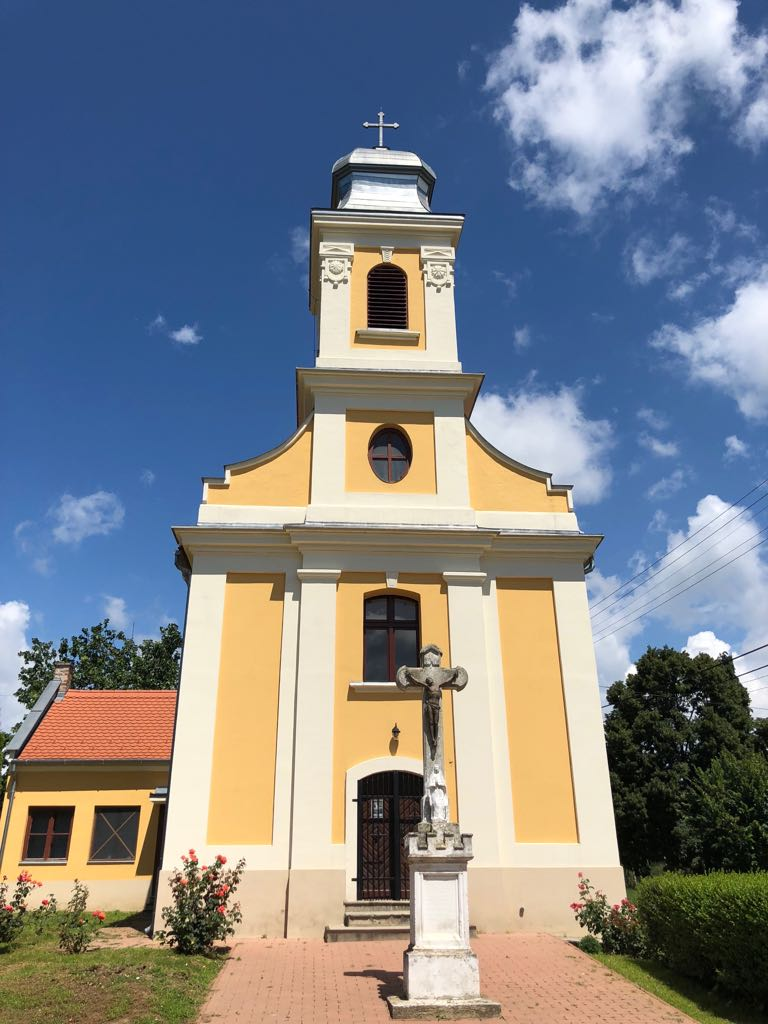
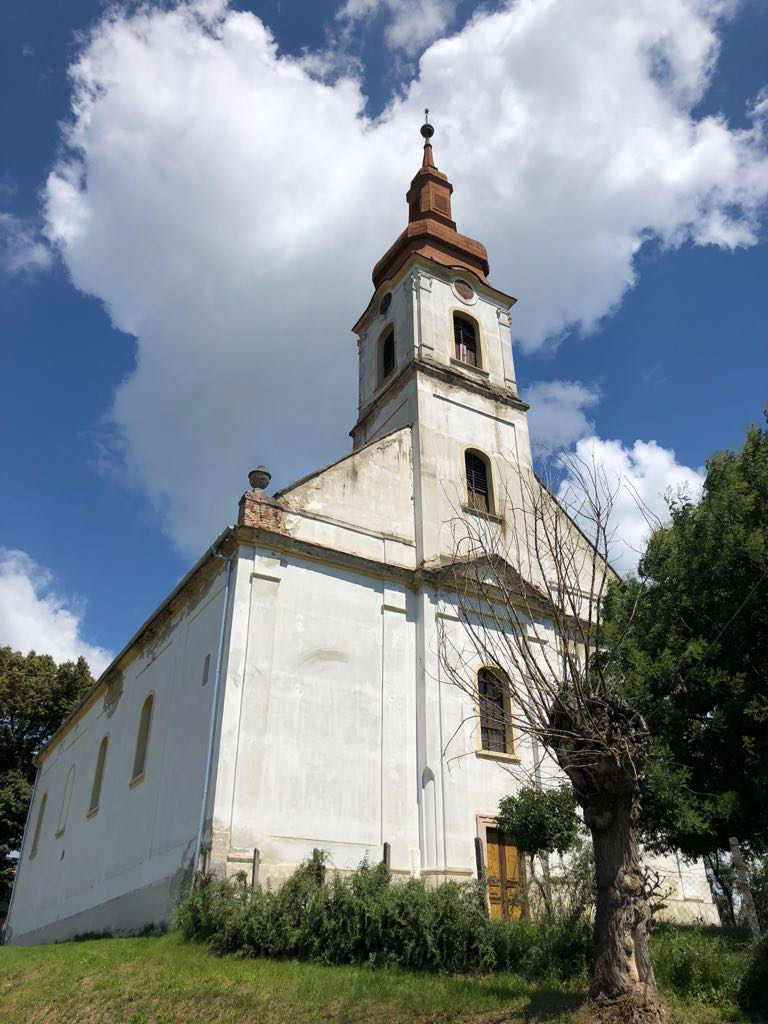
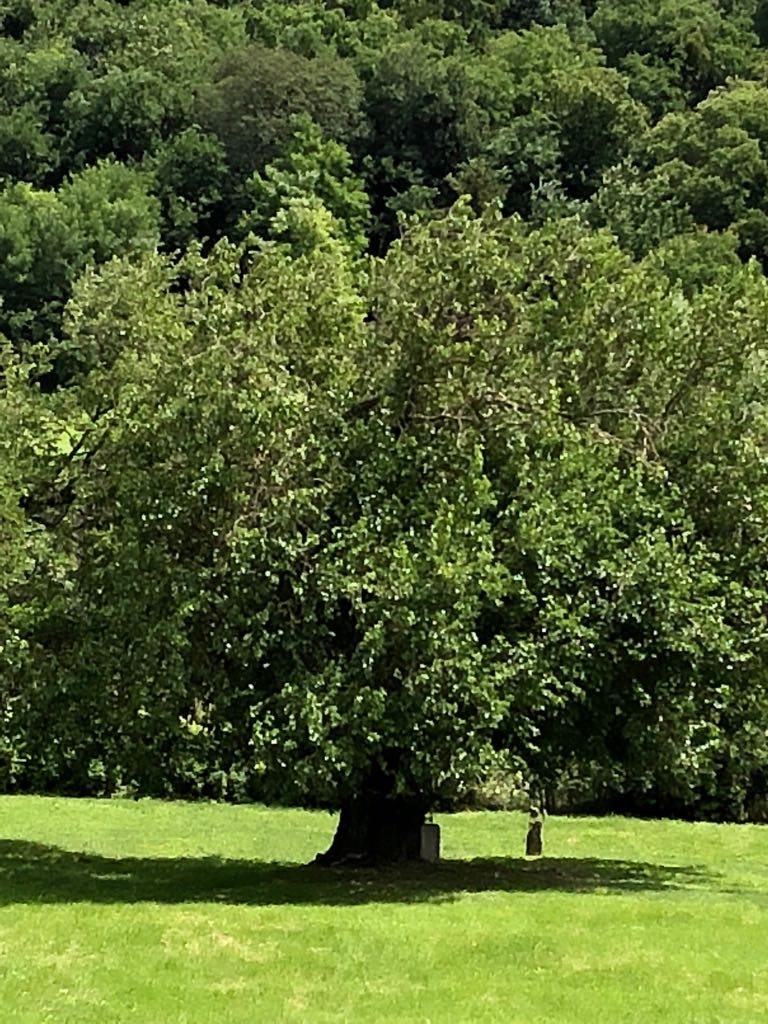
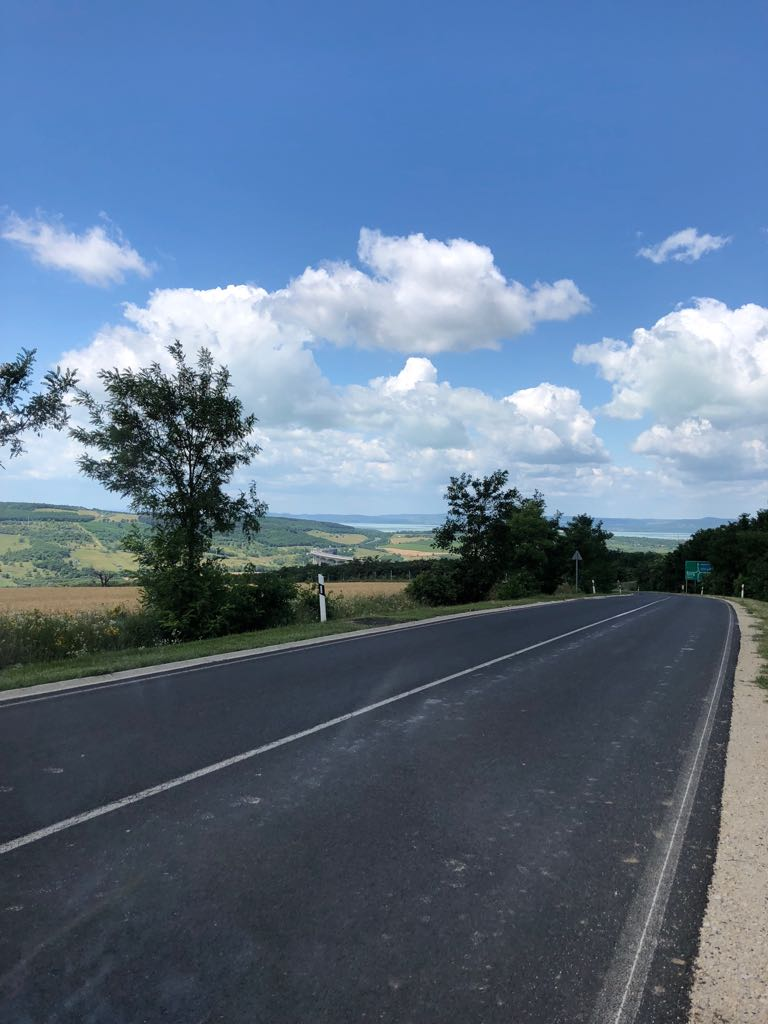
- Descending, from top: Entrance of the Primary School of Bálványos, Satzger Mansion, Roman Catholic church (Baroque style, ca. 1780, dedicated to Gabriel Archangel), Reformed church (built in 1836), More than 100 years old mulberry tree, Road from Bálványos to Lake Balaton

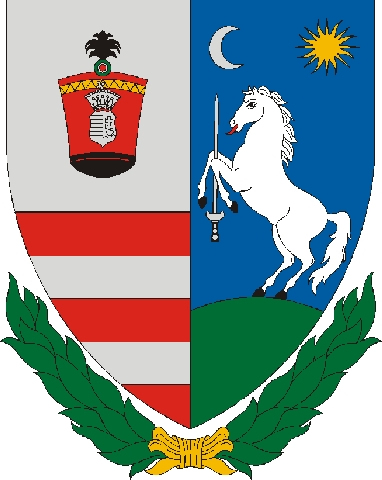
- Coat of arms

- Location of Somogy county in Hungary

- Location of Bálványos
- Coordinates: 46.78172°N 17.95242°E
- Country: Hungary
- Region: Southern Transdanubia
- County: Somogy
- District: Siófok
- RC Diocese: Kaposvár

Area
  - Total: 23.69 km^{2} (9.15 sq mi)

Population (2017)
  - Total: 556
  - Density: 23.5/km^{2} (60.8/sq mi)
- Demonym: bálványosi
- Time zone: UTC+1 (CET)
  - Summer (DST): UTC+2 (CEST)
- Postal code: 8614
- Area code: (+36) 84
- Motorways: M7
- Distance from Budapest: 125 km (78 mi) Northeast
- NUTS 3 code: HU232
- MP: Mihály Witzmann (Fidesz)
- Website: Bálványos Online

Bálványos is a village in Somogy County, Hungary.

== Etymology ==
Its name derives from the Hungarian word bálvány (English: idol), which could mean also a stone column. According to legends it was a place for pagan idolatry.

== Geography ==
It lies in the northern part of Outer Somogy, south of Gyugy-hát (311 m) (the third highest hill in Somogy County) in a valley. Lake Balaton is 10 km (6.2 mi) north of the village. It can be reached by car from the M7 Motorway. Neighbouring villages are Kőröshegy, Zala, Lulla, Balatonendréd, Kereki and Pusztaszemes.

== History ==
Bálványos and its surroundings could have been inhabited even before the Hungarian conquest of the Carpathian Basin, as evidenced by bronze fibula found in its territory. According to the legend, the place offered refuge to Koppány's fleeing armies. The settlement was first mentioned in 1001, in the Establishing charter of Pannonhalma Abbey as Baluvanis. Later in the Establishing charter of the abbey of Tihany in 1055, it was written as Baluvana and was known as a field suitable for grazing horses.

The village was donated by King Saint Stephen to Pannonhalma Abbey and it appears also in official documents of King Saint Ladislaus among the sub-estates in Somogy County. The Bull of Pope Gregory IX from 1232 also mentions it. The Lőrinte genus and the Diocese of Székesfehérvár had properties here in 1229. In 1358 it belonged to Tihany Abbey. The Johanniter of Vrana had fields there in 1431. The Bálványosi de Nagypó family and the Johanniter of Székesfehérvár both had possessions there in 1473. György Bálványosi died in 1488 without an heir so Orbán Nagylucsei, the Bishop of Eger and his brothers as well as Bernát Somogyi de Endréd acquired it as royal gift. In 1512 part of Bálványos was given to Imre Perneszi's son Imre by Vladislaus II of Hungary. János Török de Enying invited Protestant peasants to Bálványos in 1545.

After the Turkish occupation during the 18th century the settlement started to develop faster. At that time it had 300 inhabitants. In 1848, under the leadership of the village notary, 69 men became militiamen. After the Revolution and War of Independence of 1848-49, the Viennese Satzger family created a grange and built several houses in the village. According to some sources in 1866 the first kindergarten of Somogy County opened in Bálványos, although according to another source, in 1867, the first one was founded in Berzence.

In 1910, it had 1319 inhabitants of which 1303 were Hungarian. According to their religious affiliation there were 440 Roman Catholics, 837 Calvinists, 30 Lutherans.

During his regency it was one of Miklós Horthy's favourite hunting areas because of its forests which have a rich wildlife. He built a road to the village. Today, its residents work in the nearby settlements at Lake Balaton while some do individual farming.

=== Csege ===
Csege was first mentioned in 1229 in official documents. It was then the property of the Diocese of Székesfehérvár. According to a charter from 1277, some of the servants of the Monastery of Majdán of the Gutkeled (genus) lived here. The priest of the village was mentioned in 1233 as well, and the name of the settlement in the papal tithe register between 1332 and 1337. It belonged in 1333 to Péter Füle de Csege, in 1460 to Imre Somogyi and in 1466 to the Bishop of Veszprém. In 1488, Orbán Nagylucsei and his brothers got it, and in 1512 it was already in the hands of Imre Perneszi. In 1536, the Diocese of Székesfehérvár and the Bishop of Veszprém were its landlords. In 1557 it was owned by Mihály Takaró and Bálint Magyar. Between 1585 and 1589 it belonged to the Castle of Tihany, and in the 1573-1574 Ottoman Porte's tax register there were only four houses. Between 1591 and 1606, it was recorded among uninhabited places. In 1665 and later between 1726 and 1733 it belonged to the Perneszi family.

== Main sights ==
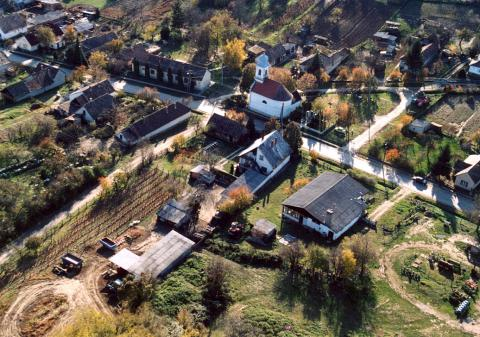
Bálványos aerial view

- Satzger Mansion
- Roman Catholic church (Baroque style, ca. 1780, dedicated to Gabriel Archangel)
- Reformed church (built in 1836)
- More than 100 years old mulberry tree
- Country house from the 19th century - typical rustic architecture of the area: thatched roof, arched veranda, made of loam
- Csú-rét (English: Csú Meadow) - According to legends there was a big stone on the meadow which served as subject to idolatry and Koppány himself sacrificed animals there to pagan gods.

== Sports ==
The village has its own football club, the Bálványos KSE since 1997. Their colours are black and white.

== Notable residents ==
- Endre Kájel (1881 – 1955), Reformed pastor, propagator of the bobbin lace of Balatonendréd
