= Atala Kisfaludy =

Poet, writer from Hungary

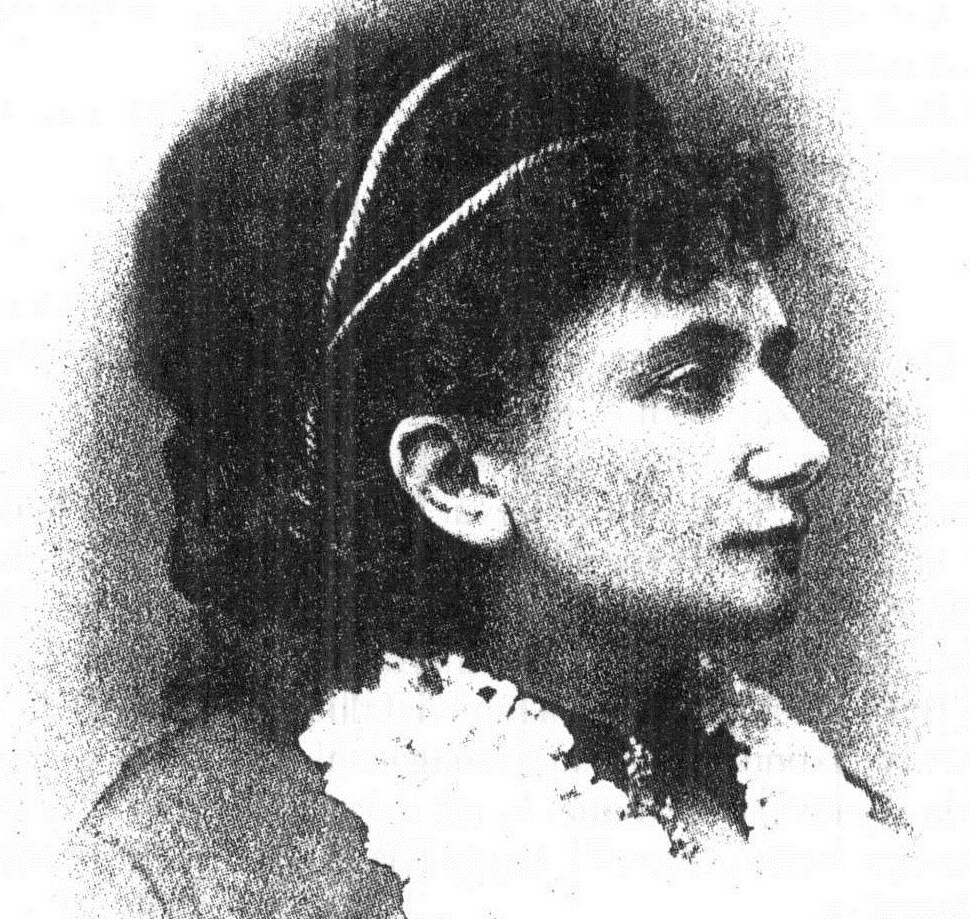
- Born: 6 April 1836; Kötcse, Kingdom of Hungary
- Died: 18 February 1911 (aged 74); Kaposvár, Kingdom of Hungary
- Spouse: Károly Szalay
- Children: Fruzina Szalay
- Parent(s): Mihály Kisfaludy; Amália Hanovszky
- Relatives: Károly Kisfaludy; Sándor Kisfaludy; Pál Ányos

Atala Kisfaludy (6 April 1836 – 18 February 1911) was a Hungarian poet, writer from Hungary. She was the first woman to be a member of the Petőfi Society.

== Biography ==
Atala Kisfaludy was born on 6 April 1836 in Vojvodina, Kötcse to the Kisfaludy family, of noble origin in Kisfalud. Her father was Captain Mihály Kisfaludy, and her mother was Amália Hanovszky. She was related to Károly and Sándor Kisfaludy as well as Pál Ányos. Kisfaludy loved poetry immensely. In 1852, she married the lawyer Károly Szalay (also written Kálolyné Szalay) and they lived in Kaposvár where they had three daughters. Kisfaludy was a member of the cultural life in the city but in 1858, she fell ill. During this time, she began to write poetry. Her poems appeared in Hölgyfutár and then Vasárnapi Újság. Her work was published only under her given name, Atala. She only began to use her family name in 1876, and was never published under it. Kisfaludy was the first woman in the Petőfi Society in 1878. In 1861, she founded and edited a children's magazine with Richard Szabó. She died on 18 February 1911 in Kaposvár.

== Bibliography ==
- Atala költeményei (Poems of Atala), 1861
- Kisfaludy, A. (1879). Rajzok (in German). Franklin.
- Kisfaludy, A. (1880). Kisfaludy Atala összes költeményei (in Hungarian). Jeiteles Herman Ny.
