= Siófok District =

Coordinates: 46.90550628902484°N 18.044952707640824°E

Siófok District Siófoki járás
- Districts of Hungary
- Coat of arms

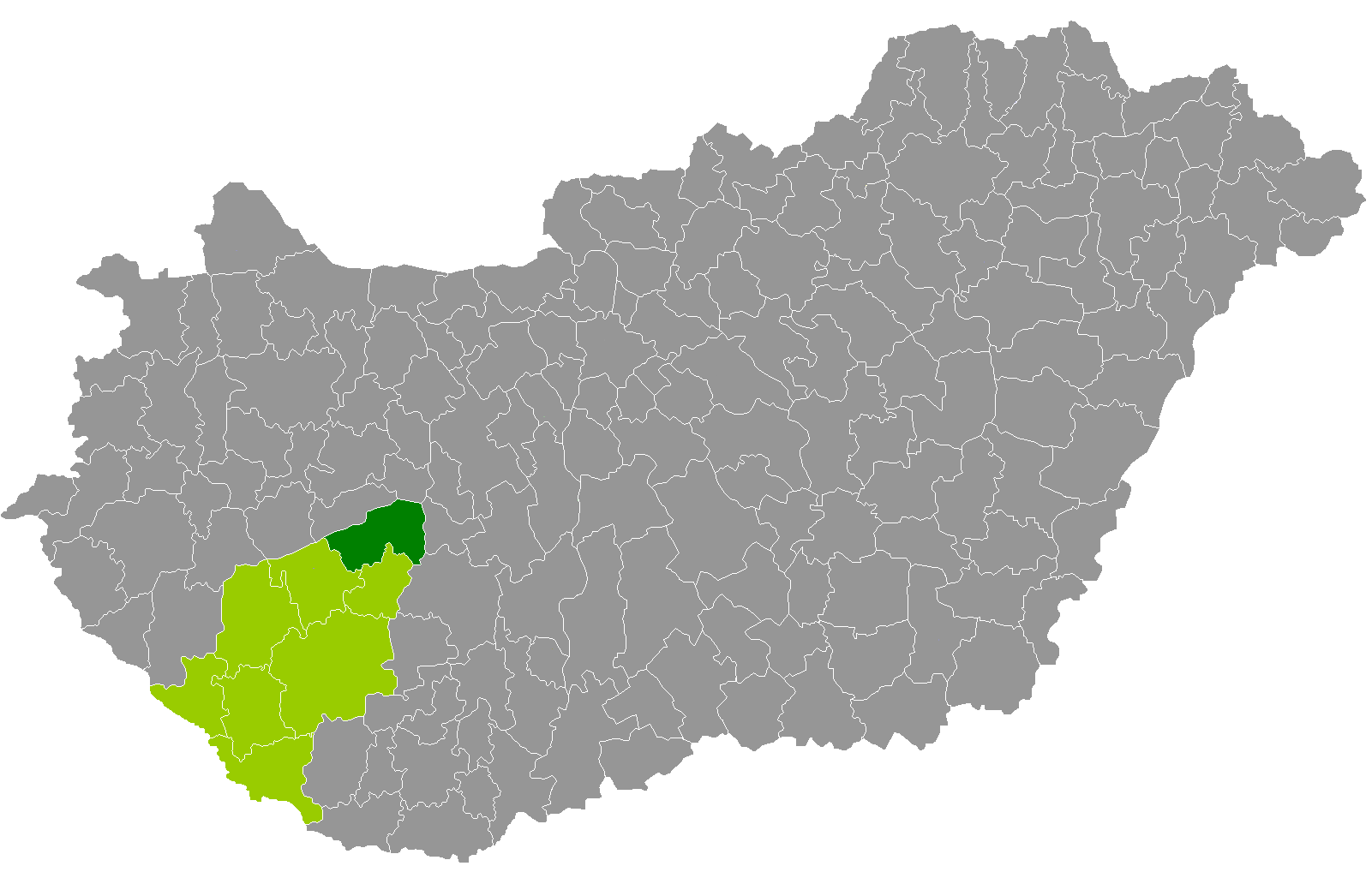
- Siófok District within Hungary and Somogy County.
- Country: Hungary
- Region: Southern Transdanubia
- County: Somogy
- District seat: Siófok

Area
  - Total: 657.05 km^{2} (253.69 sq mi)
  - Rank: 4th in Somogy

Population (2011 census)
  - Total: 51,099
  - Rank: 2nd in Somogy
  - Density: 78/km^{2} (200/sq mi)

Siófok (Hungarian: Siófoki járás) is a district in Somogy County, in south-western Hungary. The district is located in the north-eastern part of the county. Siófok is also the name of the town where the district seat is located. The district is located in the Southern Transdanubia Statistical Region.

== Geography ==
Siófok District borders Balatonfüred District and Balatonalmádi District (Veszprém County) to the north, Enying District (Fejér County) to the east, Tamási District (Tolna County) to the southeast, Tab District to the south, and Fonyód District to the west. The number of the inhabited places in Siófok District is 24.

== Municipalities ==
The district has 3 towns, 1 large village and 20 villages. (ordered by population, as of 1 January 2013)

- Ádánd (2,124)
- Balatonendréd (1,330)
- **Balatonföldvár** (2,235)
- Balatonőszöd (507)
- Balatonszabadi (2,994)
- Balatonszárszó (1,965)
- Balatonszemes (1,827)
- Balatonvilágos (1,195)
- Bálványos (544)
- Kereki (556)
- Kötcse (481)
- Kőröshegy (1,329)
- Nagyberény (1,330)
- Nagycsepely (386)
- Nyim (270)
- Pusztaszemes (343)
- Ságvár (1,830)
- **Siófok** (25,441) – district seat
- Siójut (620)
- Som (701)
- Szántód (592)
- Szólád (501)
- Teleki (209)
- **Zamárdi** (2,451)

The municipalities in bold text are cities, italics municipality is a large village.

== See also ==
- List of cities and towns in Hungary
