= Balatonszabadi =

- Village
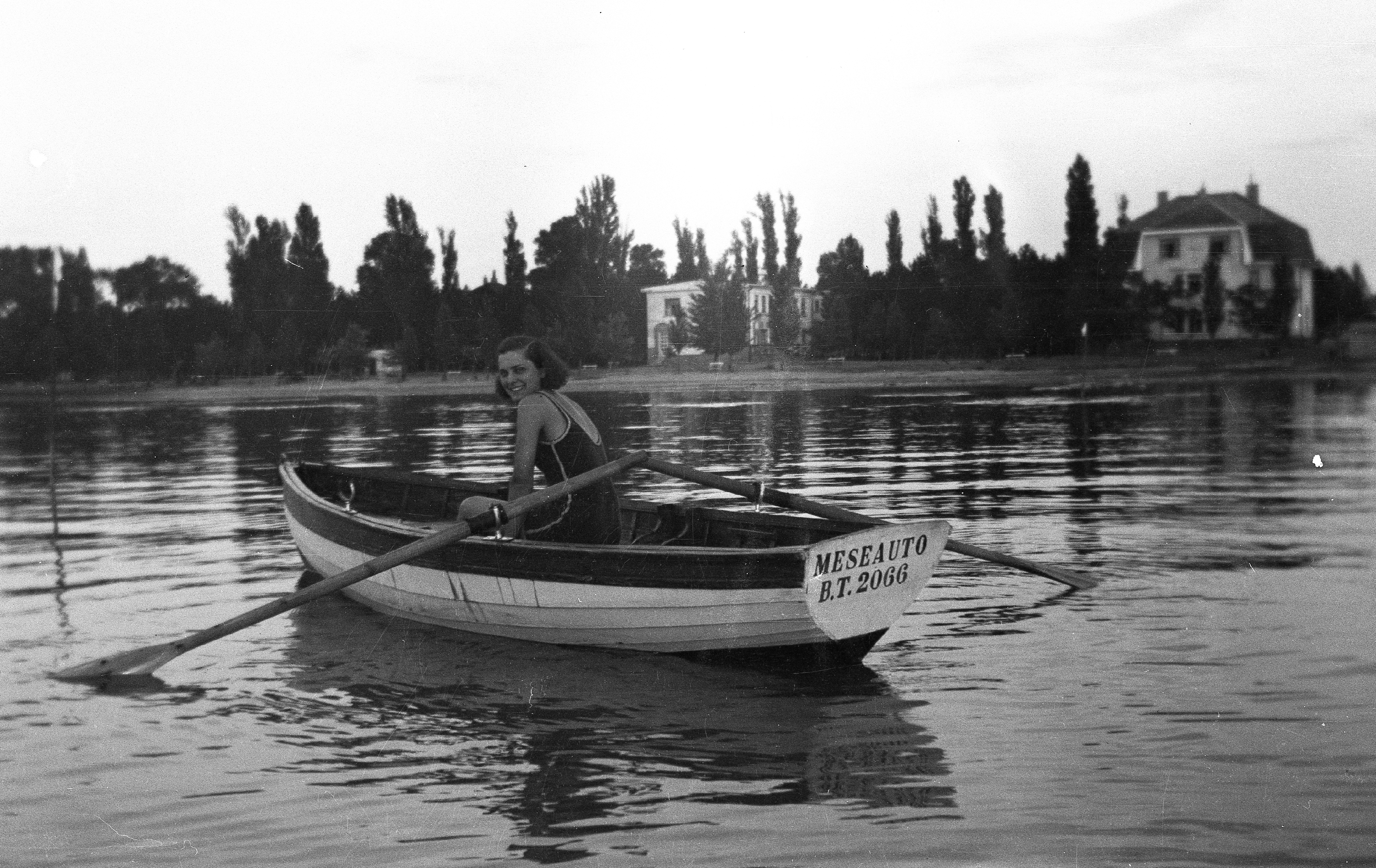
- Summer 1930

- Coat of arms

- Location of Balatonszabadi
- Coordinates: 46.89298°N 18.13661°E
- Country: Hungary
- Region: Southern Transdanubia
- County: Somogy
- District: Siófok
- RC Diocese: Kaposvár

Area
  - Total: 41.34 km^{2} (15.96 sq mi)

Population (2017)
  - Total: 2,952
  - Density: 71.41/km^{2} (184.9/sq mi)
- Demonym(s): szabadi, balatonszabadi
- Time zone: UTC+1 (CET)
  - Summer (DST): UTC+2 (CEST)
- Postal code: 8651
- Area code: (+36) 84
- Motorways: M7
- Distance from Budapest: 103 km (64 mi) Northeast
- NUTS 3 code: HU232
- MP: Mihály Witzmann (Fidesz)
- Website: Balatonszabadi Online

Balatonszabadi is a village in Somogy county, Hungary.

East of Balatonszabadi, there is a mediumwave broadcasting facility with a 145 metres tall guyed mast radiator used for Magyar Katolikus Rádió on 1341 kHz with 150 kW. The mast carries an FM-broadcasting antenna at a height of 56 metres.

The settlement is part of the Balatonboglár wine region.

== Geography ==
Balatonszabadi lies on the shores of Sió in the northeastern part of Somogy County, 6 km far from Siófok, the seat of Siófok District. It can be reached by turning to the south in Aranypart (English: Golden Shore, part of Siófok) on the other side of M7 Motorway. The village is part of the Balatonboglár Wine Region.

== Demographics ==
The majority of the population of Balatonszabadi is Hungarian (87.1%). Significant minorities are Germans (1.5%) and Gypsies (1.4%). The population is Catholic (Roman Catholic (54.7%) and Greek Catholic (0.2%)). There is also a remarkable Calvinist (11.6%) and Lutheran (1.5%) minority. 9.5% of the population belongs to no churches.

== Main sights ==
The village is home to the first public statue of Lajos Kossuth in Hungary. The first sculpture was made by Béla Gerenday and was erected on 26 June 1894 on the Kossuth square, the main square of the village. But in the World War II it got seriously damaged, therefore on the centenary of the Hungarian Revolution of 1848, in 1948 a new monument of Lajos Kossuth was erected which is a replica of the original one.

== Notable residents ==
- Imre Veszprémi (1932 - 2013), Hungarian sculptor
- Kálmán Csukás (1901 – 1943), Hungarian lieutenant colonel
- János Szikszay (1803 – 1849), Hungarian Reformed pastor, martyr of the Hungarian Revolution of 1848
