= Nyim =

- Village
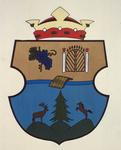
- Coat of arms

- Location of Somogy county in Hungary

- Location of Nyim
- Coordinates: 46.80468°N 18.10477°E
- Country: Hungary
- Region: Southern Transdanubia
- County: Somogy
- District: Siófok
- RC Diocese: Kaposvár

Area
  - Total: 9.76 km^{2} (3.77 sq mi)

Population (2017)
  - Total: 305
  - Density: 31.2/km^{2} (80.9/sq mi)
- Demonym: nyimi
- Time zone: UTC+1 (CET)
  - Summer (DST): UTC+2 (CEST)
- Postal code: 8612
- Area code: (+36) 84
- NUTS 3 code: HU232
- MP: Mihály Witzmann (Fidesz)
- Website: Nyim Online

Nyim is a village in Somogy county, Hungary.
