= Szólád =

- Village
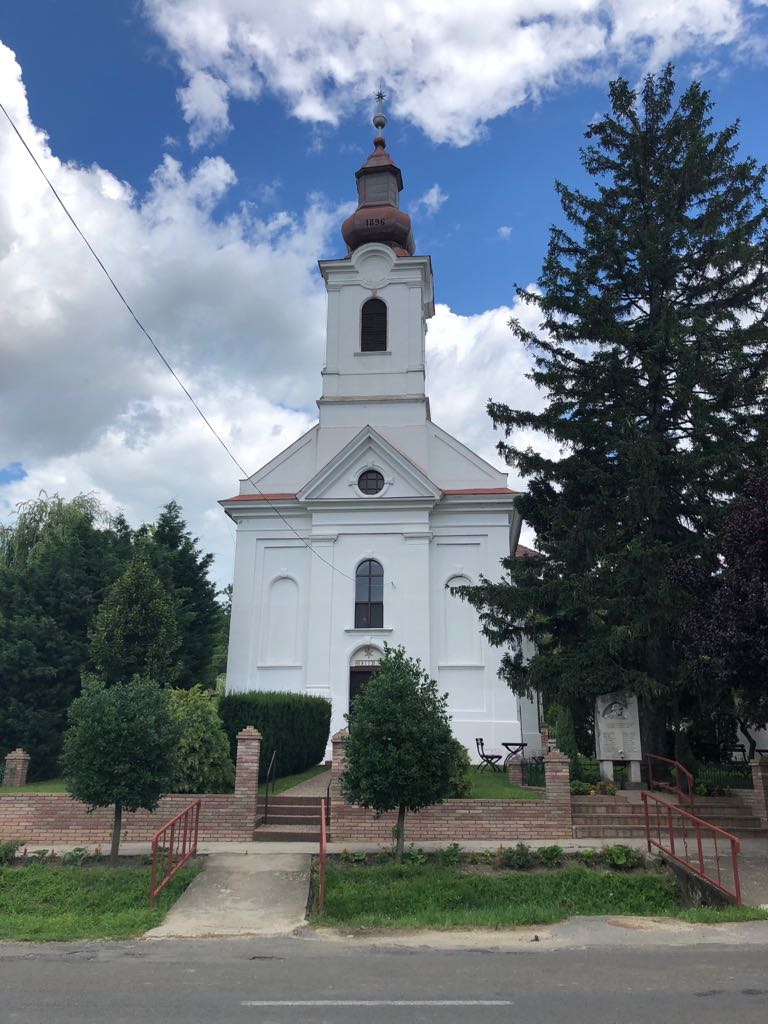
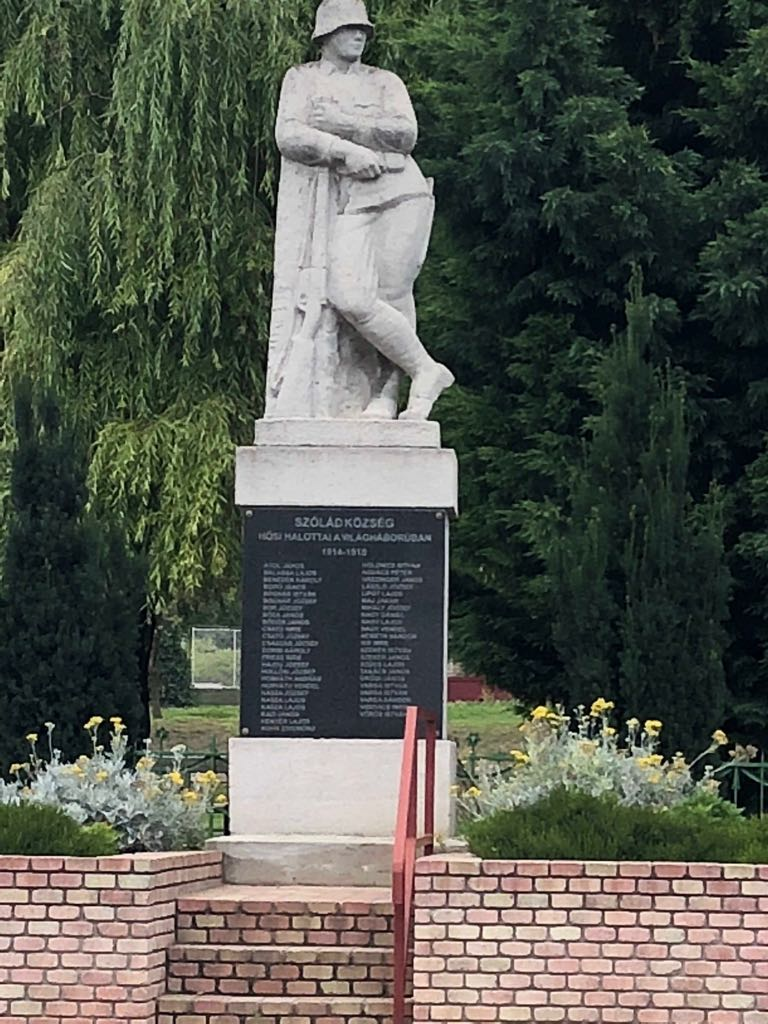
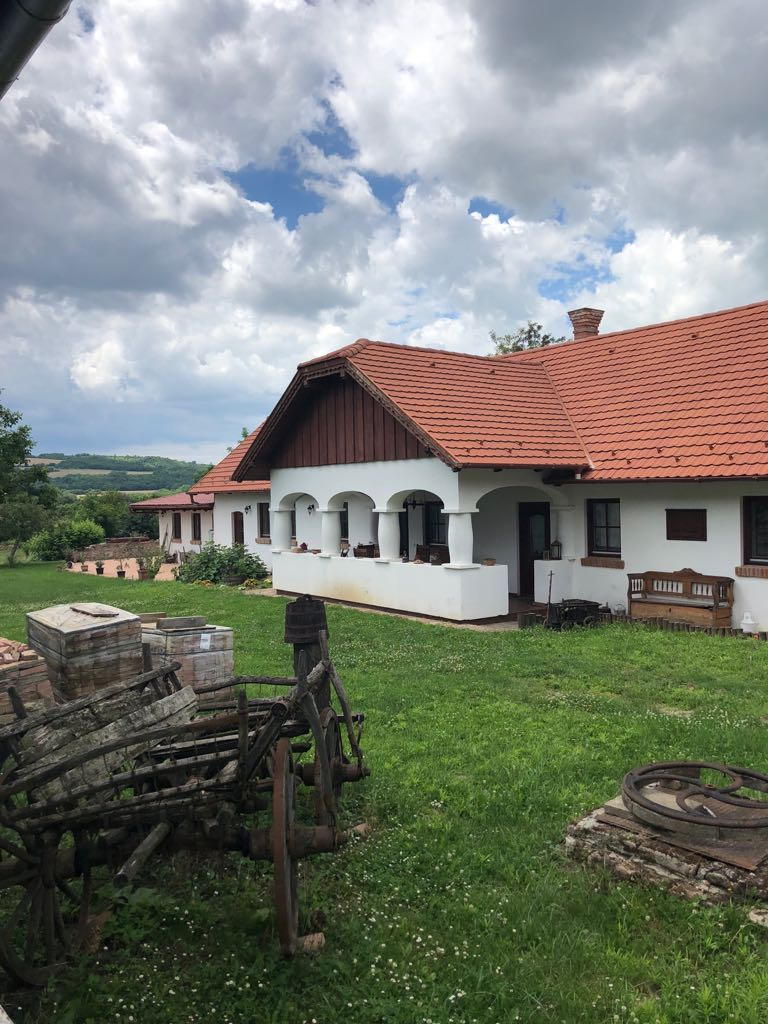
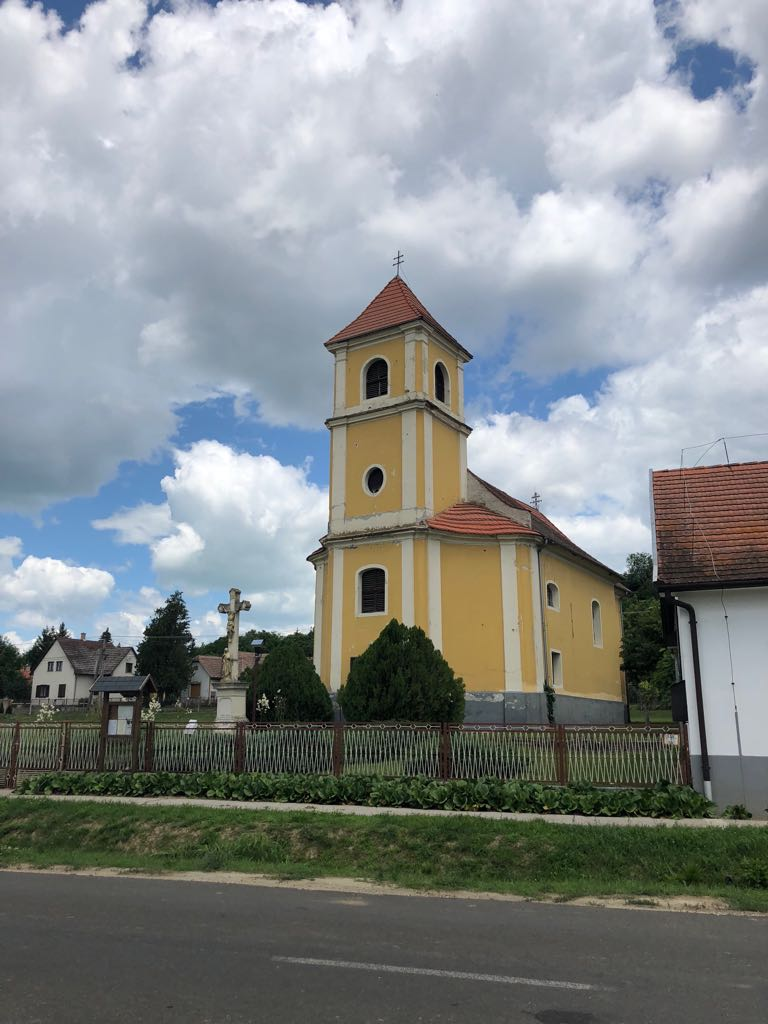
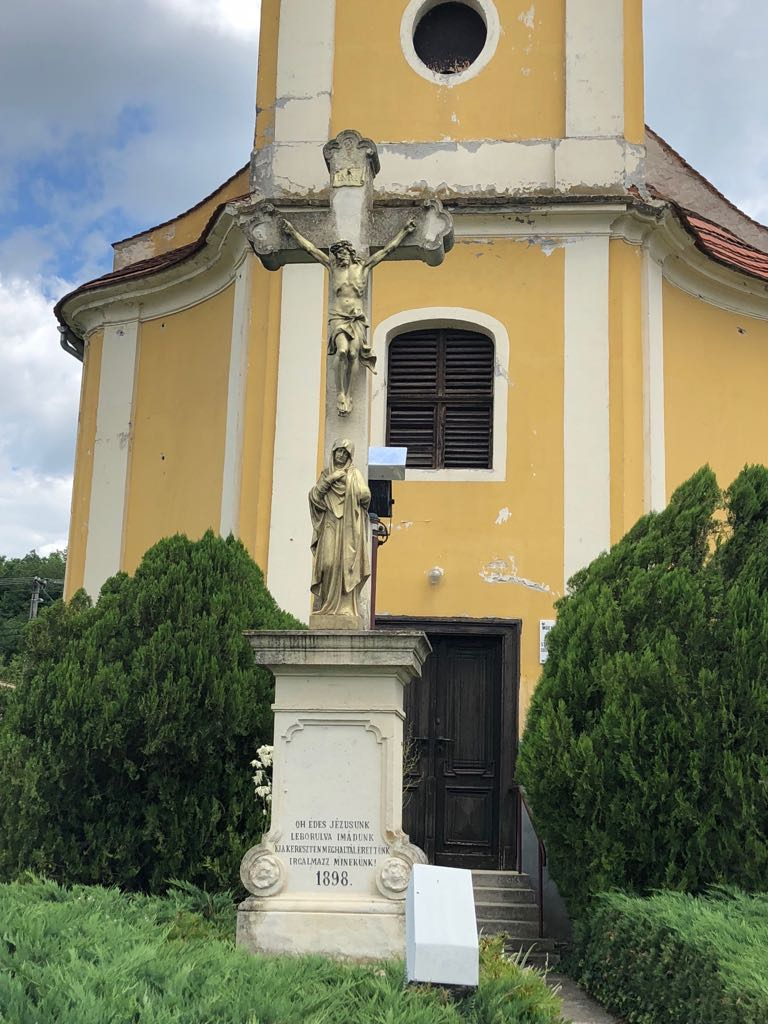
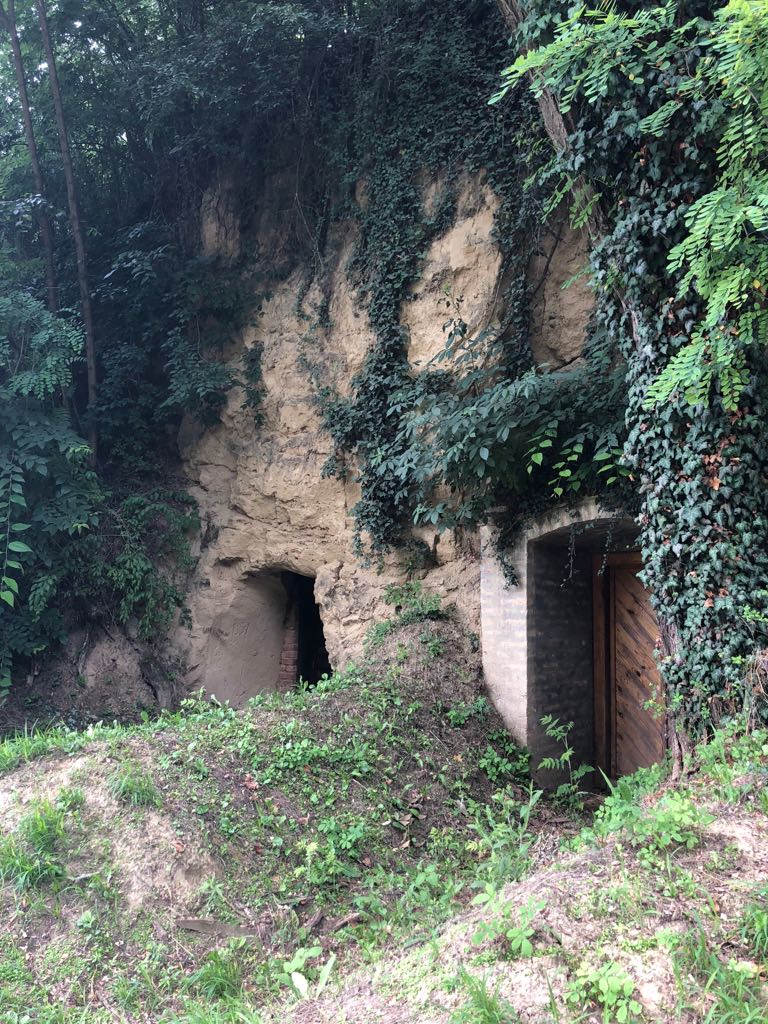
- Descending, from top: Reformed church (built in 1896), Monument of the heroes of the First World War, Country house, Roman Catholic church (built 1775-1782), Holy cross before the Roman Catholic church, Wine cellar

- Coat of arms

- Location of Somogy county in Hungary

- Location of Szólád
- Coordinates: 46.783333°N 17.85°E
- Country: Hungary
- Region: Southern Transdanubia
- County: Somogy
- District: Siófok
- RC Diocese: Kaposvár

Area
  - Total: 19.98 km^{2} (7.71 sq mi)

Population (2017)
  - Total: 484
  - Density: 24.2/km^{2} (62.7/sq mi)
- Demonym: szóládi
- Time zone: UTC+1 (CET)
  - Summer (DST): UTC+2 (CEST)
- Postal code: 8625
- Area code: (+36) 84
- Motorways: M7
- Distance from Budapest: 133 km (83 mi) Northeast
- NUTS 3 code: HU232
- MP: Mihály Witzmann (Fidesz)
- Website: Szólád Online

Szólád is a village in Somogy county, Hungary.

The settlement is part of the Balatonboglár wine region.

== Main sights ==
- Reformed church (built in 1896)
- Monument of the heroes of the First World War
- Country houses
- Roman Catholic church (built between 1775 and 1782)
- Holy cross before the Roman Catholic church
- Wine cellars

== Gallery ==
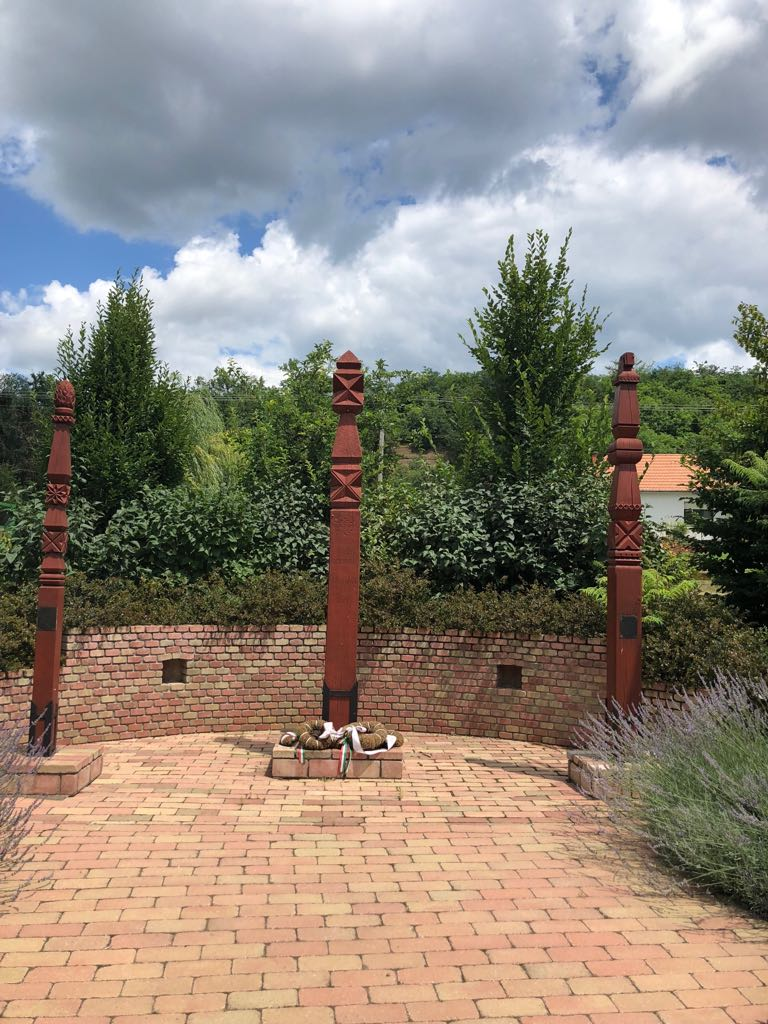
Headboard monument for the Revolutions of 1848 and 1956

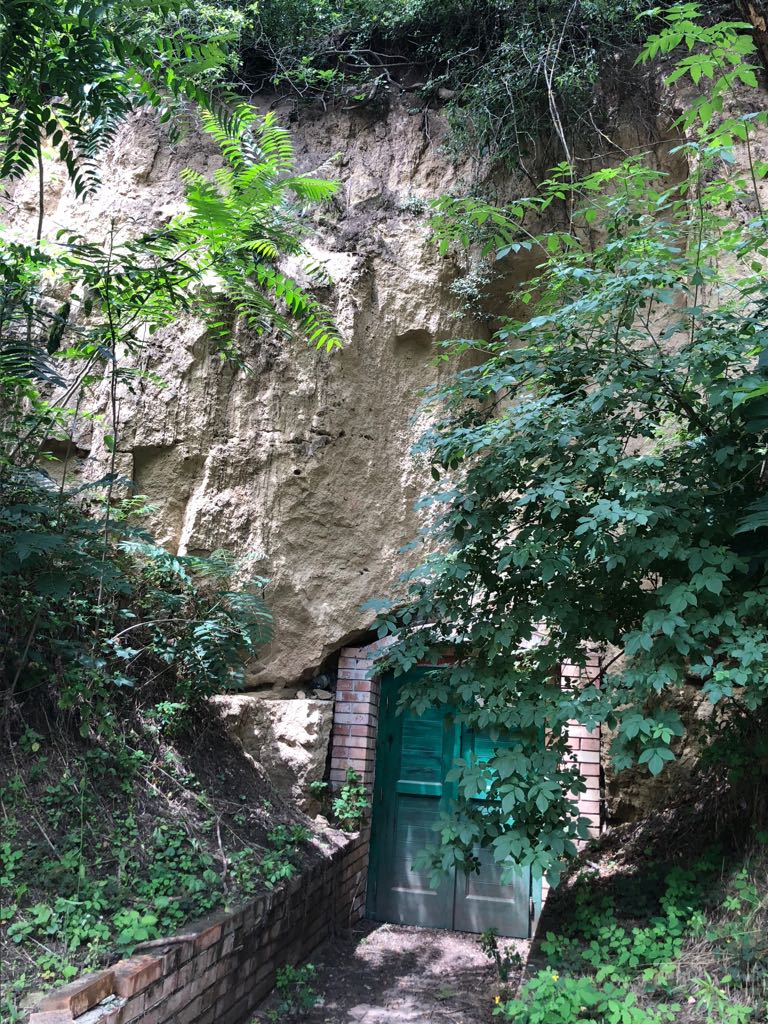
Wine cellar in Szólád

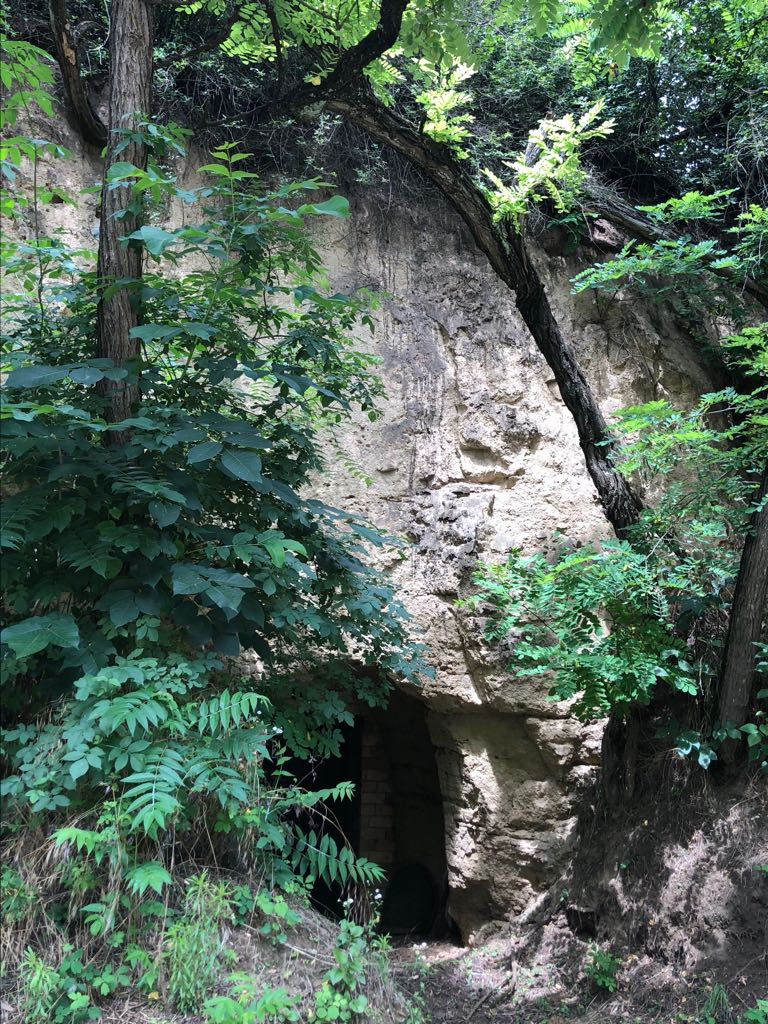
Wine cellar in Szólád

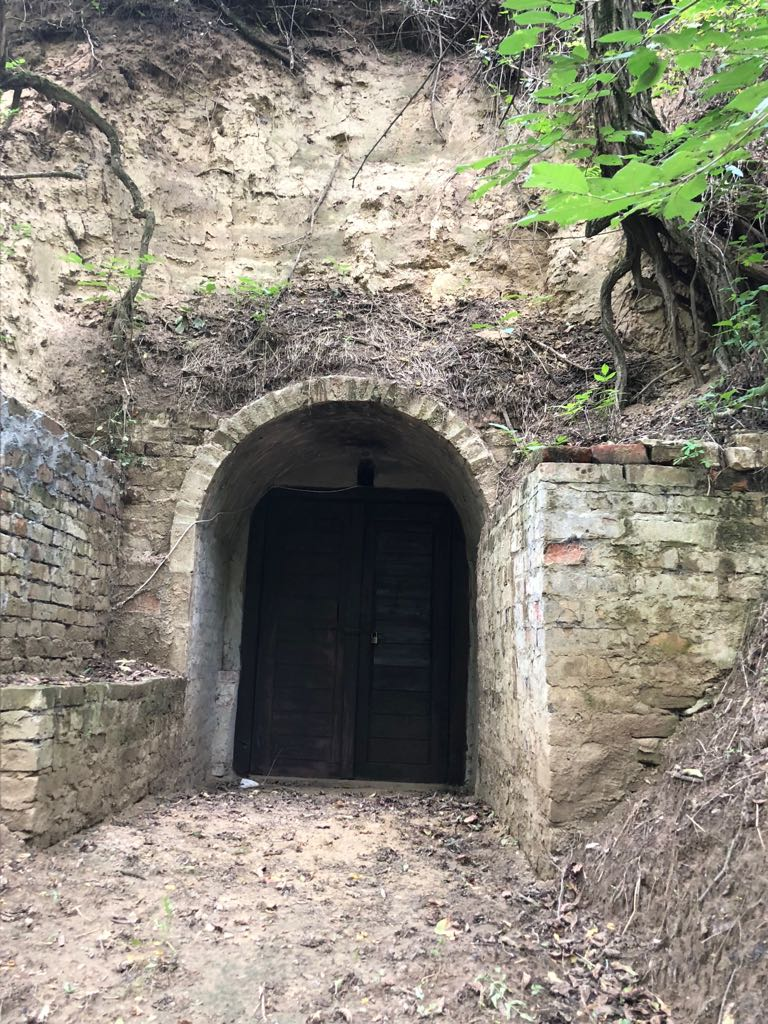
Wine cellar in Szólád

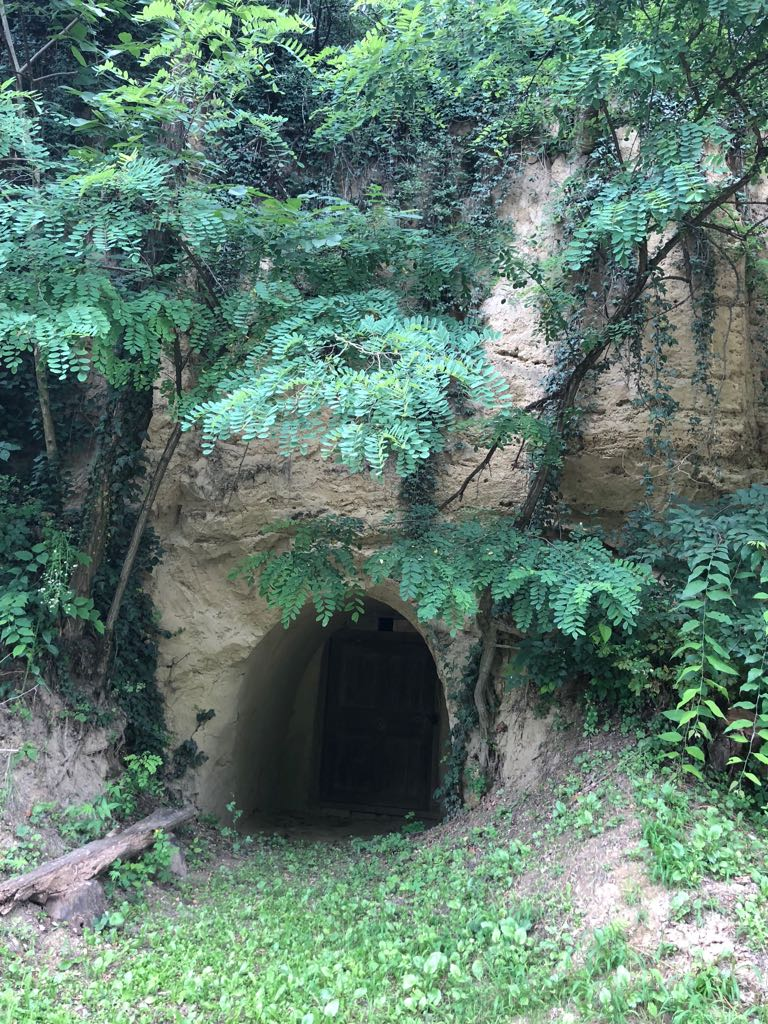
Wine cellar in Szólád

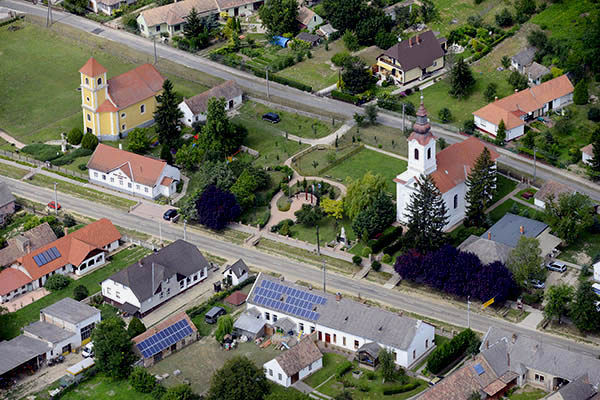
Centre of Szólád
