= Fruzina Szalay =

Hungarian poet and translator

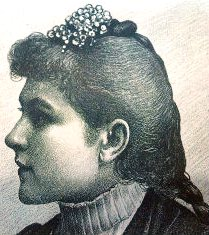
- Born: 10 September 1864; Kaposvár, Austrian Empire
- Died: 10 July 1926 (aged 61); Kaposvár, Hungary
- Spouse: Károly Obetkó

Fruzina Szalay (10 September 1864 – 10 July 1926) was a Hungarian poet and translator.

Fruzina Szalay was born in Kaposvár, 10 September 1864 to lawyer Károly Szalay and poet Atala Kisfaludy. Her career began when she started translating poets and had her work published in the Metropolitan Papers and in the Szana Tamás's Koszorú. In 1886 Szalay married Károly Obetkó who was Attorney General in Somogy County in Kaposvár. Her translations again appeared in 1889 From 1890 she was a regular contributor to József Kiss's A Hét, Vasárnapi Újság, Hazánk (1904), and Kert (1904). Szalay was a member of the Countess Sándorné Teleki's salon and wrote stories and articles as well as poetry of her own and the translations of others poetry. Szalay died in Kaposvár of tuberculosis in 1926.

== Bibliography ==
- "Magyar Poetry : Loew, William N." 1908.
- Poems, 1893
- A handful of flowers, 1898
- Bébi és Micóka, 1906
