= Zsigmond Széchenyi =

Hungarian hunter and writer (1898–1967)

Count Sigmund Széchenyi
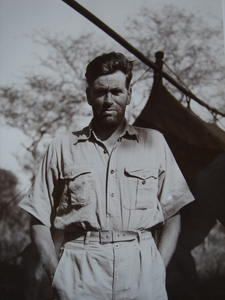
- Sigmund Széchenyi in Africa
- Born: 23 January 1898; Nagyvárad, Bihar County, Austria-Hungary
- Died: 24 April 1967 (aged 69); Budapest, Hungary
- Spouses: Stella Crowther; Margit Hertelendy of Hertelendi and Vindornyalaki
- Children: Count Péter Széchenyi (from his first wife)

Count Sigmund Széchenyi of Sárvár-Felsővidék (Hungarian: Széchenyi Zsigmond; 23 January 1898 – 24 April 1967) was a Hungarian hunter, traveler and writer. He was a main figure of the Hungarian hunting culture, having hunted in Africa, India, Alaska and various parts of Europe. His outstanding hunting trophy is a world record addax, and his hunting library is the most significant collection of hunting books in Hungary, which can currently be viewed in the Hungarian Museum of Natural History.

== Biography ==
=== Family and marriages ===
He was a descendant of the Széchenyi family of the Roman Catholic nobility, Sárvár-Hinterland. His father was Viktor Széchenyi of Sárvár-Felsővidék (1871–1945), Count of Sárvár-Felsővidék and the Lord of Fejér County and the free royal city of Székesfehérvár. His mother was Countess Carolina Mária von Ledebur-Wicheln (1875–1956). His paternal grandparents were Count Dénes Széchenyi (1828–1892), a member of the Main House and the Parliament, and Countess Mária Hoyos (1838–1926), a noblewoman and member of the royal palace. His maternal grandparents were Count Johann von Ledebur-Wicheln (1842–1903), a nobleman, royal chamberlain, and ministerial counselor, and Countess Caroline Czernin of Chudenice (1847–1907), a noblewoman and member of the royal palace. He had one brother, Count Antal Széchényi, and three sisters, Countesses Sarolta Antónia Széchenyi ("Charlotte"), Irma Széchényi, and Márta Széchényi.

Sigmund was the great-grandson of Count Ferenc Széchényi, the founder of the Hungarian National Museum, and Count Lajos Széchényi, who was the brother of Count István Széchenyi, a notable historical figure still known to many as "the Greatest Hungarian".

His first marriage was with Stella Crowther (Wimbledon, London, England, July 24, 1913 – † Henfield, West Sussex, England, December 27, 1990); on June 2, 1936, which happened in the Sigismund Chapel in Buda, Budapest. The wedding ceremony was performed by Lajos Shvoy, Bishop of Székesfehérvár. Following the wedding, the ceremony had lunch at the Park Club, then the young couple traveled to the countryside. Their son, Count Péter Széchenyi, was born in London on February 4, 1939, but the three of them lived in Hungary. Stella Crowther and his son Péter Széchenyi moved back to her homeland at the beginning of the war. During the siege of Budapest, their villa, which was the property of Crowther, was burned to the ground with all their valuables. Zsigmond Széchenyi lived in his father's house in Budavár until his deportation. On March 13, 1945, he was taken by the Soviet authorities, held in a camp in Tisza Kálmán - Republic Square, and then in Csömör until April 19, 1945.

Meanwhile, during one of his interrogations at the Mosonyi prison, he coincidentally met with his father, who had succumbed to his injuries due to abuse suffered in captivity two days before his release. He divorced his wife in 1945. From 1947 he became a hunting supervisor and then a specialist museologist until 1950. He was, however, still the hunting supervisor of the National Forest Center. In 1951, he was deported to Tiszapolgár, lodging in a henhouse, which was occupied by the animals when he arrived. After five months, he was able to move to another forced residence in Balatongyörök, where his acquaintances made an acceptance statement. In November 1952, he was deported by the police to Keszthely, then to Veszprém, and to the Budapest provisional detention facility in early December. At the beginning of April, he was transferred to the Sopronkőhida prison for two months, then returned to the provisional prison, from where he was released on 13 June. He had to move back to Balatongyörök, where he lived until the spring of 1959. Here he met his second wife, Margit Hertelendy.

Under the communist regime, he got a job with help from a friend at the Keszthely Helikon Library, where he could hunt again. His second wife, Margaret Hertelendy (Pacsa, Zala County, March 26, 1925 - Budapest, September 5, 2021) was a divorcée from Hertelend and Vindornyalak of ancient Transdanubian origin. The couple married on 5 May 1959 in Keszthely. Margaret worked in the Keszthely Helikon Library along with Zsigmond. Her first husband, Miklós Birck, was an agricultural engineer whom Margaret shared a daughter with, Eszter Birck. Margaret Hertelendy's father, József Hertelendy (1889–1933) from Hertelend and Vindornyalak, was a judge in Perlak, a member of the county committee, a landowner from Pacsa, and her mother was Margit Szentmihályi (1894–1977) from Révfalva. The paternal grandparents of Margaret Hertelendy; József Hertelendy (1855–1907) from Hertelend and Vindornyalak, was a member of the Zala County Legislature, a landowner, and a knight, her grandmother was Elvira Kucinic (1859–1880). Margaret's maternal grandparents were Dezső Szentmihályi (1863–1935), a landowner, member of the Upper House and vice-president of the "Zalavármegyei Economic Association", and Ilona Koller (1871–1934).

Margaret Hertelendy's ancestor was György Hertelendy (1764–1831), an alias of Zala, who was the guardian of Ferenc Deák and his brothers when they were orphaned. No child was born from the marriage of Count Zsigmond Széchenyi and Margaret Hertelendy.

=== Education ===
Szécheny spent his childhood in Sárpentele, Fejér County (now Sárszentmihály), and in his Austrian and Czech relatives' homes in Gutenstein, Milleschau and Niemes. He completed his secondary education at the State High School in Székesfehérvár, and then at the Ferenc József High School in Budapest.

He graduated in 1915, then was immediately enlisted and served in the World War I from 1916 to 1918. He then began his legal studies, but stopped in 1919 because he wanted to dedicate himself to the studying nature and fauna. He completed his higher education in Munich and Stuttgart between 1920 and 1921, and in 1922-1923 he further expanded his language and zoological knowledge in Oxford and Cambridge.

=== World War II and afterwards ===
Between 1924 and 1932, he farmed on Kőröshegy in Somogy County, at which time his first African animal gathering and hunting expedition fell. In the spring of 1927, he hunted with László Almásy in Sudan, then hunted in Egypt, Libya, Kenya, Tanganyika and Uganda. Alaska followed in 1935, India in 1937–38, and Africa again in 1938. He suffered great losses during World War II. His villa on Istenhegyi út in Budapest burned down and so was his trophy collection. From 1947; he worked as a hunting supervisor at the National Forestry Center. In 1950 at the Agricultural Museum, he was a specialist museologist, but in 1951 he was relocated to a farm next to Polgár in Hajdú County. He suffered a lot of injustice in the Rákosi era, but then in the 1950s he entered the Keszthely Helikon Library, where he worked on a professional bibliography on hunting literature in four languages. In 1955, the Fiction Publishing House published "Csui! ..." which had not been published for a quarter of a century. His wife Margit Hertelendy encouraged him to write again.

In 1960 he went on an official state expedition to East Africa (with István Dénes, János Szunyoghy, Imre Schuller and Kornél Böröczky). He arrived in Africa for the ninth but also last time in 1964. In the last years of his life he was given to have his work recognized under socialist regime as well. János Kádár also hunted with him. He died on April 24, 1967, in Budapest. His specialist library miraculously survived World War II, counting more than 4,000 volumes at the time of his death. Zsigmond Széchenyi's hunting library is the most significant collection of hunting books in Hungary, which was purchased by the Ministry of Agriculture in 1969 for the Natural History Museum.

== Hunting trips ==
=== Europe ===
Between 1915 and 1930, he hunted red deer mainly in the Bakony, Vértes and Kőröshegy estates in Hungary and therefore traveled to the Carpathians. He visited Transylvania regularly from 1941, mostly to the Grand Distress in Maro-storda, where, in addition to deer, he hunted bears, roe deer, wild boar in Tyrol, where he visited year after year to hunt chamois and grouse. During his travels in Europe, he visited several countries, including black grouse in Scotland, Alpine ibex in Italy, and so on.

=== Africa ===
- 1927 His first hunting trip to Africa took place with László Almásy as his companion in the eastern half of Sudan in the Kassala province near the Abyssinian border. His account of this is in the second part of his book; Following in the Footsteps of Deer.
- 1928 His hunt in November at Buff and Rhino Camp, next to the Ewaso Ng'iro River in Kenya, in the Maasai Reserve happened with; leopard, lion, buffalo, African elephant, impala, rhino. His first book, Chui, tells about this journey. Here he dropped the largest elephant party ever killed by a Hungarian hunter - weighing 133 and 1/2 pounds, 134 and 1/2 pounds. In this hunt, his partner was István Károlyi.
- 1929 in March he was following the elephants in the Kitui countryside, Kenya.
- 1932 November - March 1933: He returned to Kenya, where he hunted mainly elephants, bongos, antelopes and lions. This and his journey in the winter of 1933 are commemorated in his book African Campfires.
- 1933 November - March 1934: In Kenya, he hunted cape buffalo in the northern Ewaso Ng'iro area, a large booby on Mount Khulal, an elephant at christmas, and then again a buffalo and a lion.
- 1935 January - March: He took part in an expedition led by László Almásy in the Libyan desert in Sudan, where he hunted antelope with Jenő Horthy. He shot his world record-breaking Addax here. His desert experiences were captured in his book Rolling Sand.

He hunted a Nubian ibex in Egypt returning from India in 1938, according to his Two Goats book.

=== Asia ===
December 1937 - March 1938: He summarized his hunting experiences in India in his book Nahar.

=== North America ===
In the summer of 1935, he hunted moose in Alaska along with Kodiak bear, Canadian wild sheep, and caribou.

== Memorial ==
In 2014, the Széchenyi Sigismund Hunting Museum was opened in the Grassalkovich Castle in Hatvan, in which the Széchenyi Sigismund Memorial Room was also created with his personal objects and memories. October 2022, several personal items were added to the exhibition, including furniture, paintings that had been in the home of Margit Hertelendy through the decades.

== Works ==
=== Hungarian ===
Title	Year of Publication	Number of Issues	Number of Copies
Csui!...	1930.	10 Issues	351 650
Elefántország	1934.	2 Issues	9000
Hengergő homok	1935.	3 Issues	45 600
Alaszkában vadásztam	1937.	9 Issues	210 550
Nahar	1940.	8 Issues	280 200
Afrikai tábortüzek	1959.	4 Issues	187 000
Ahogy elkezdődött	1961.	5 Issues	159 350
Denaturált Afrika	1968.	2 Issues	90 500
Vadászat négy földrészen	1987.	1 Issue	19 600
Két kecske		1 Issue	3000
Trófeáim bemutatkoznak		1 Issue	16 000
A szarvas selejtezése		1 Issue	500
Ünnepnapok		4 Issues	122 800
Szarvasok nyomában		1 Issue	76 000
Total		52 Issues	1 571 750

=== Other languages ===
- Land of Elephants (London)
- Tusschen dieren Gouddelvers (Amsterdam)
- Alaska (Münich)
- Bergteufel und Wüstenböcke (Salzburg)
- Nahar kral 'dzungle (Bratislava)
- Poloval somma Alaske (Bratislava)
- Wie es begann... (Salzburg)
- Feiertage (Salzburg)
