= Kötcse =

Kötcse Kötsching (in German)
- Village
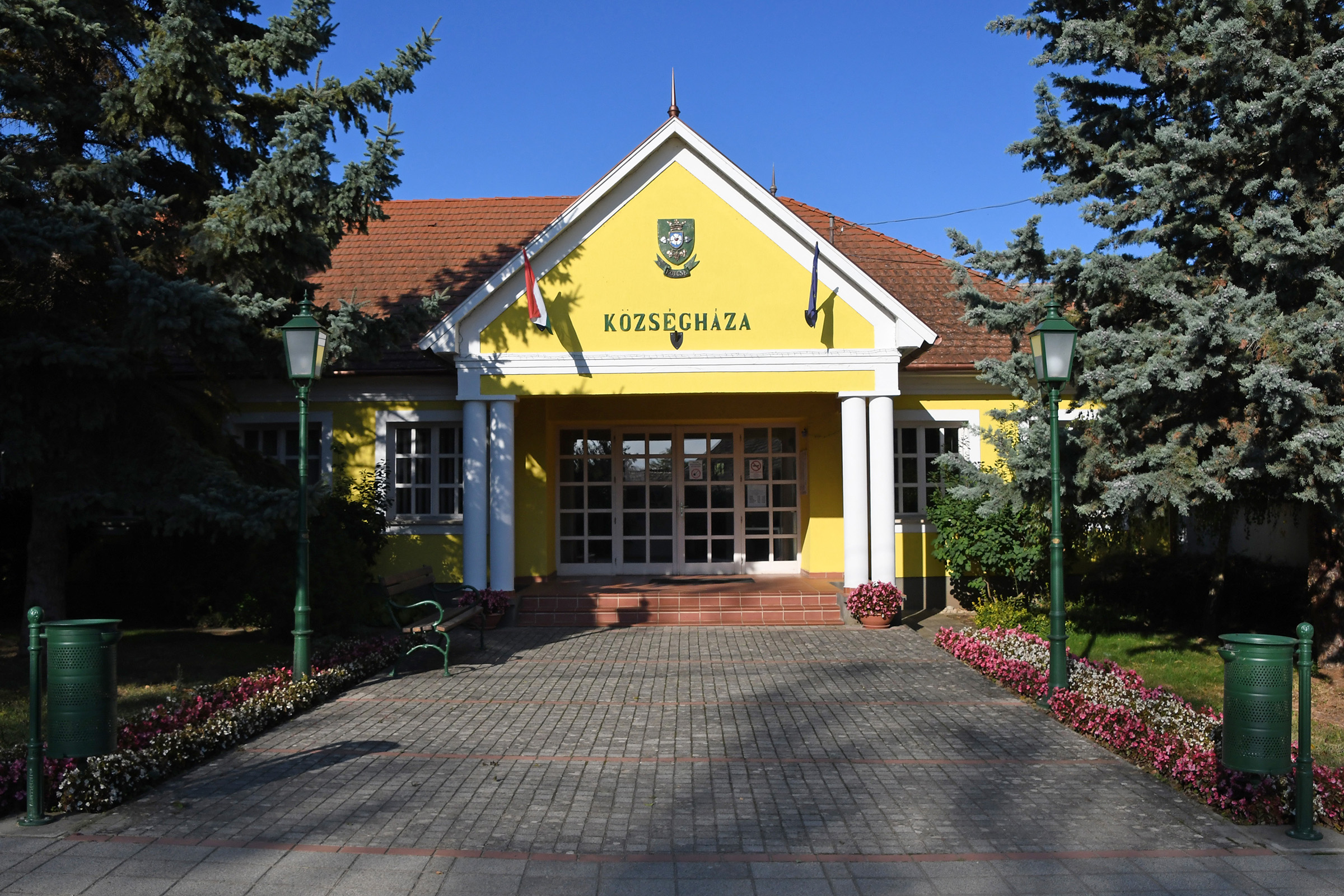
- Village hall

- Coat of arms

- Location of Somogy county in Hungary

- Location of Kötcse
- Coordinates: 46.75460°N 17.85990°E
- Country: Hungary
- Region: Southern Transdanubia
- County: Somogy
- District: Siófok
- RC Diocese: Kaposvár

Area
  - Total: 19.54 km^{2} (7.54 sq mi)

Population (2017)
  - Total: 507
  - Density: 25.9/km^{2} (67.2/sq mi)
- Demonym: kötcsei
- Time zone: UTC+1 (CET)
  - Summer (DST): UTC+2 (CEST)
- Postal code: 8627
- Area code: (+36) 84
- NUTS 3 code: HU232
- MP: Mihály Witzmann (Fidesz)

Kötcse (German: Kötsching) is a village in Somogy county, Hungary. The village is known for being a summer resort because of its proximity to Lake Balaton and its good weather conditions. Several houses are weekend houses and have no permanent residents. Among others former Prime Minister and leader of the DK political party, Ferenc Gyurcsány spends his holidays here with his family. Since 2004 the settlement and the Dobozy Chateau hosts the Polgári Piknik meeting organized by the Polgári Magyarországért Alapítvány of the Christian-conservative elite. Leading figures of Hungarian life - politicians, thinkers, scientists, business people - gather together in the village for the event.

The settlement is part of the Balatonboglár wine region.

== Etymology ==
The name Kötcse derives from a personal name Kékcse which is the combination of the word kék (English: blue) and the affix -cse. The name of the village changed with time from Kékcse to Kötcse.

== Geography ==
It is located in the northern part of Somogy County, 9 km from Lake Balaton, approx. 130–260 meters above sea level. Kötcse is just 400 meters away from the closest village, Nagycsepely. The closest town is Balatonföldvár 15 km away. The nearest railway station is located in Somogymeggyes about 6 km away. The settlement is part of the Balatonboglár Wine Region.

== History ==
Kötcse was first mentioned by Andrew II of Hungary in 1229 as Keccha inferior (Lower-Kötcse) and Keccha superior (Upper-Kötcse). In the 14th and 15th century it was owned by cathedral chapter of the Diocese of Székesfehérvár. During the Turkish occupation the village perished. Later the Antall family brought here Lutheran Germans from Hesse to revive the settlement.

In most settlements of Somogy County, like in Kötcse, several small manor houses and mansions were built in the 18th century. There were 19 mansions of small landowner noble people in Kötcse. For now just 9 of them survived.

== Main sights ==
- archeological finds from the new Stone Age and ancient times
- coins from the Middle Ages
- 9 of the former 19 noble mansions (e.g. Kazay Mansion, Keserű Mansion, Antall Mansion, Bíró Mansion (Békavár), Csepinszky Mansion)
- Lutheran Church (built in late Baroque style, 18th century)

== Dobozy-mansion ==
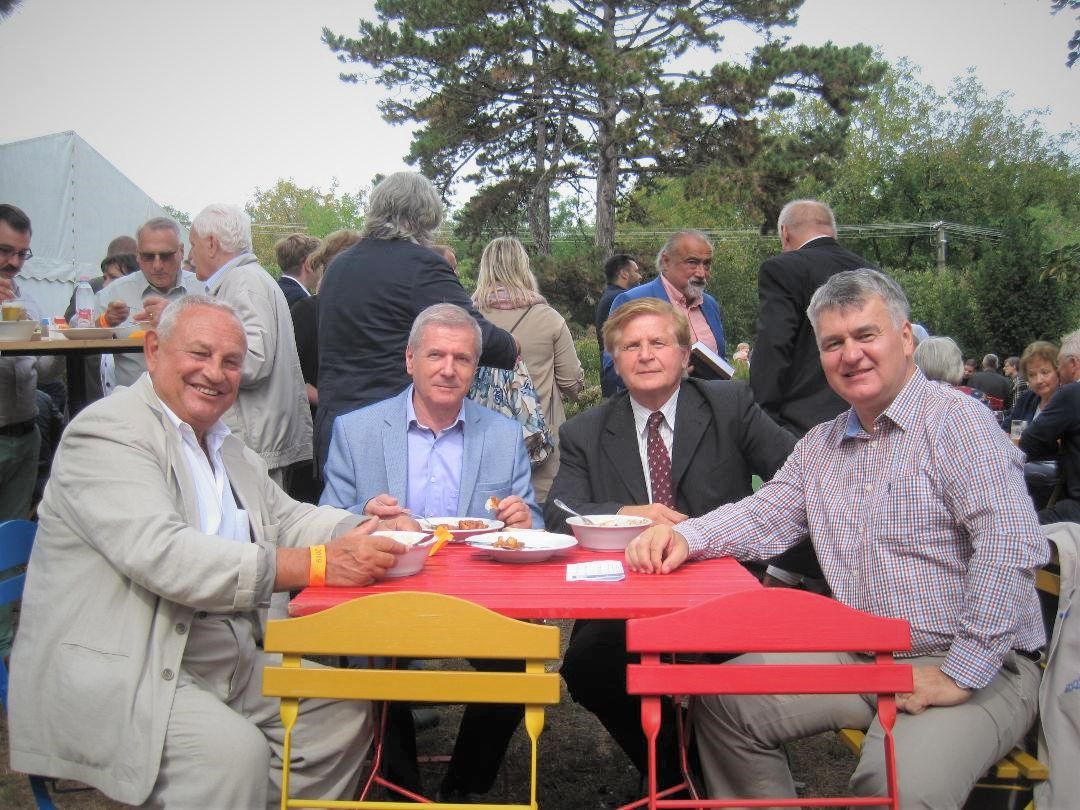
In the Park - Kötcse-meeting in 2019

Hungarian political season starts with Kötcse-meeting at Dobozy-mansion, at the beginning of Autumn. Dobozy-mansion was built in 1810, in baroque style. The present owner, Miklós Dobozy bought the mansion in 1988 from Sándor Kesserű. After the turkish occupation of Hungary, Kötcse was inhabited by 5 hungarian families. János Antall, captain of Tihany castle, landowner of the village in the 1720s settled in the village 50 families from Hessen, Germany, whose descendents are living there evan today.

== Notable residents ==
- Atala Kisfaludy (1836–1911) poet, first female member of the Petőfi Society
- István Roboz (1828–1916) journalist, founder of the first county weekly newspaper called Somogy

== Literature ==
- Zoltán Tefher : Kötcse - A község telepítéstörténete
