= Siójut =

- Village
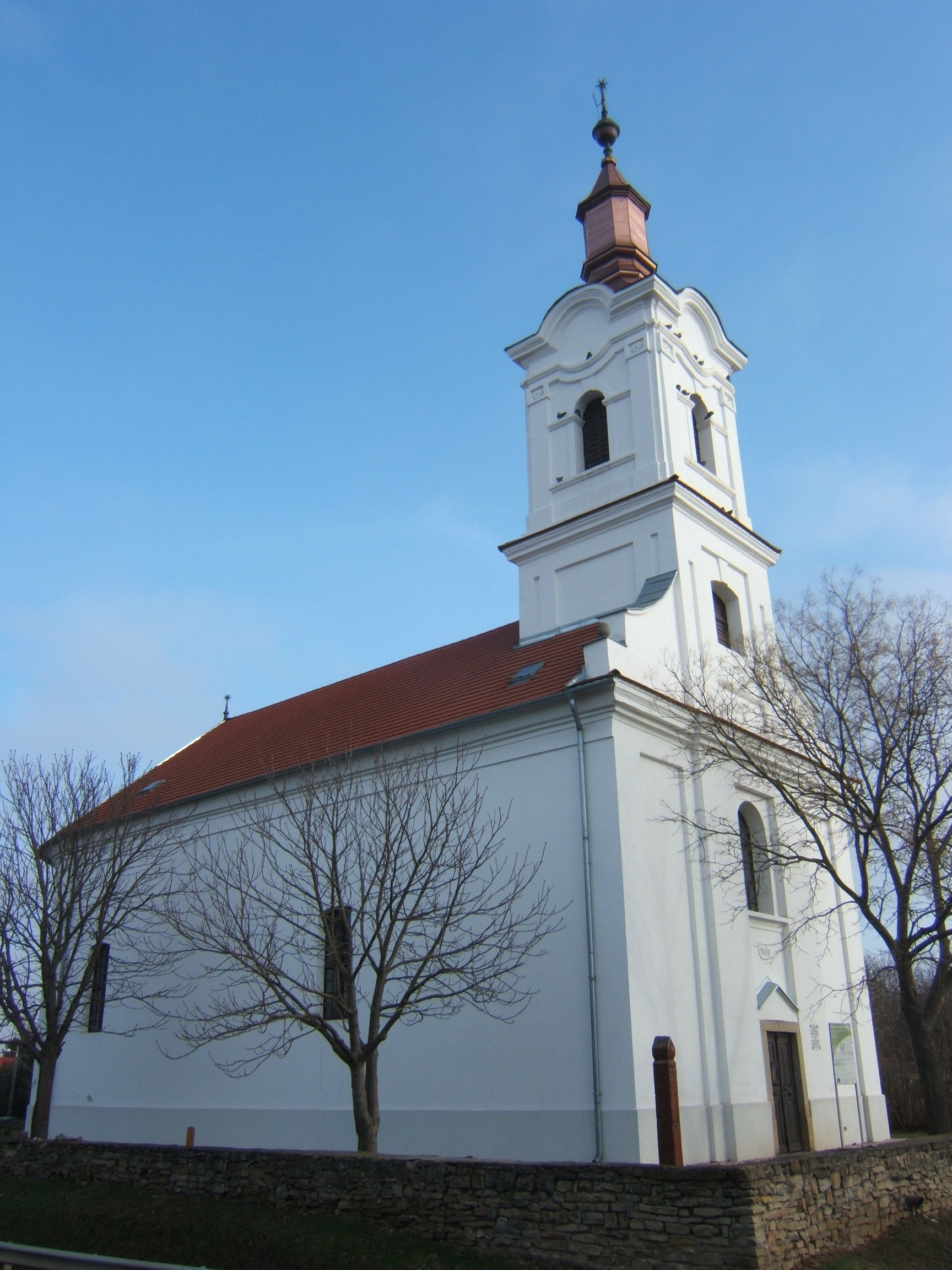
- Reformed church of Siójut

- Coat of arms

- Location of Somogy county in Hungary

- Location of Siójut
- Coordinates: 46.883333°N 18.133333°E
- Country: Hungary
- Region: Southern Transdanubia
- County: Somogy
- District: Siófok
- RC Diocese: Kaposvár

Area
  - Total: 10.73 km^{2} (4.14 sq mi)

Population (2017)
  - Total: 617
  - Density: 57.5/km^{2} (149/sq mi)
- Demonym: siójuti
- Time zone: UTC+1 (CET)
  - Summer (DST): UTC+2 (CEST)
- Postal code: 8652
- Area code: (+36) 84
- NUTS 3 code: HU232
- MP: Mihály Witzmann (Fidesz)
- Website: Siójut Online

Siójut is a village in Somogy county, Hungary.
