= Kőröshegy =

- Village
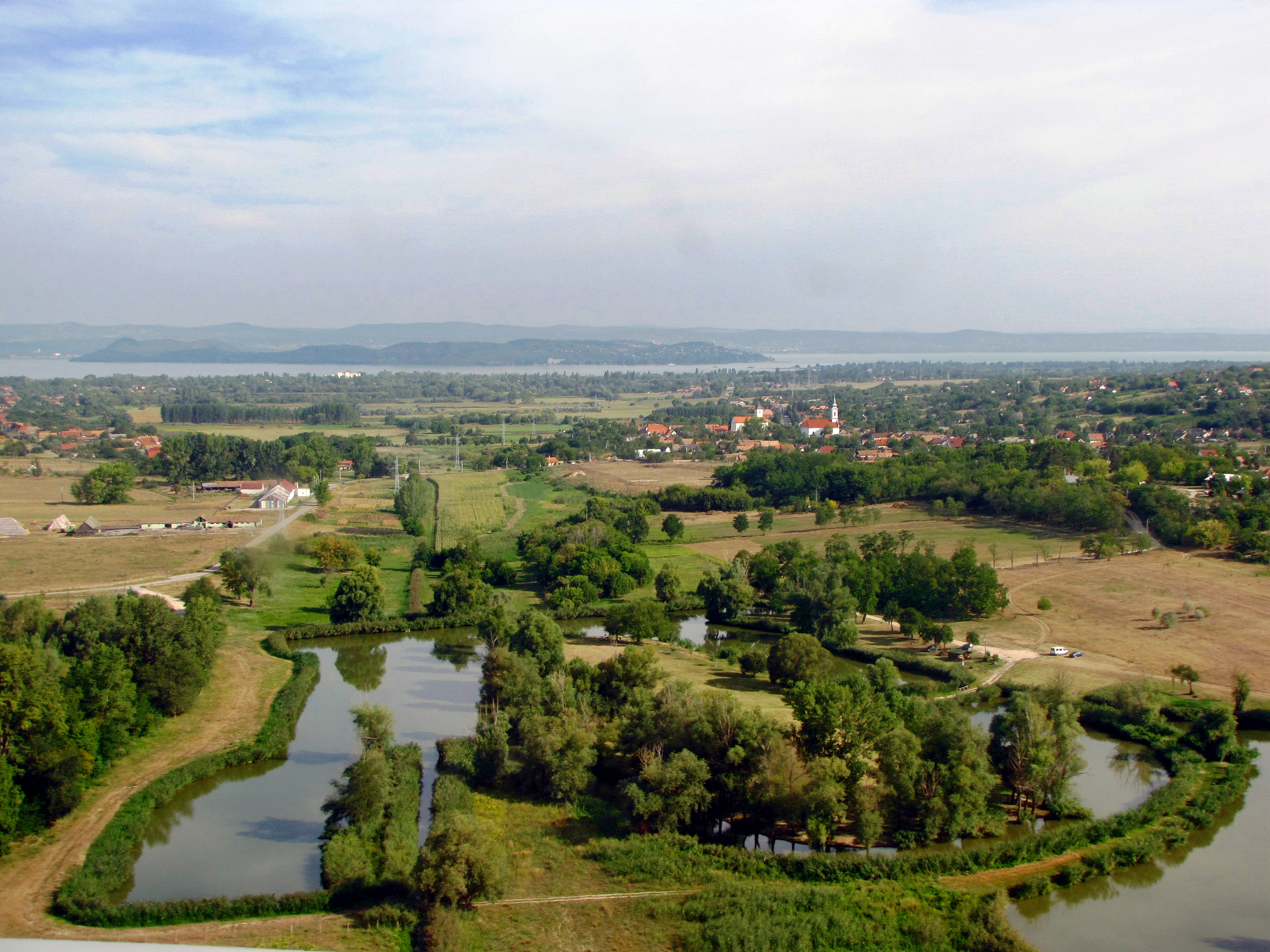
- Kőröshegy with the Tihany Peninsula in the background

- Coat of arms

- Location of Kőröshegy
- Coordinates: 46°49′54″N 17°54′02″E
- Country: Hungary
- Region: Southern Transdanubia
- County: Somogy
- District: Siófok
- RC Diocese: Kaposvár

Area
  - Total: 21.7 km^{2} (8.4 sq mi)
- Highest elevation: 312 m (1,024 ft)
- Lowest elevation: 106 m (348 ft)

Population (2017)
  - Total: 1,352
  - Density: 62.3/km^{2} (161/sq mi)
- Demonym: kőröshegyi
- Time zone: UTC+1 (CET)
  - Summer (DST): UTC+2 (CEST)
- Postal code: 8617
- Area code: (+36) 84
- Motorways: M7
- Distance from Budapest: 124 km (77 mi) Northeast
- NUTS 3 code: HU232
- MP: Mihály Witzmann (Fidesz)
- Website: Kőröshegy Online

Kőröshegy is a village directly south of Balatonföldvár in Siófok District, Somogy County, Hungary.

The settlement is known in Hungary for being a holiday destination near to Lake Balaton attracting thousands of visitors yearly. Kőröshegy is also famous for its grapes, wine and the Viaduct of Kőröshegy on the M7 Motorway which is a symbol of the village.

The settlement is part of the Balatonboglár wine region.

== Etymology ==
There are several theories about the origin of the name of the village. According to the most accepted one it derives from the name of the tree, Fraxinus (Hungarian: Kőris) which is typical on the settlement. In medieval descriptions this territory was named Kreuris tue (Hungarian: Kőristő). In Somogy County people used or use the word hegy (English: mountain) instead of domb (English: hill).

According to the second also popular explanation the fact that the village is surrounded by hills could lead to the world körös which meant kör alakú (English: round).

Kajetán Darnay states that the village was named after the Scythian king, Kőrös who ruled in the region.

Nicolaus Olahus, the Archbishop of Esztergom, named the settlement Kereszthegy (English: Cross Mountain) in his writing from 1536. István Tikos referred to Kőröshegy as Keren and Kereszthegy in 1819.

== Geography ==
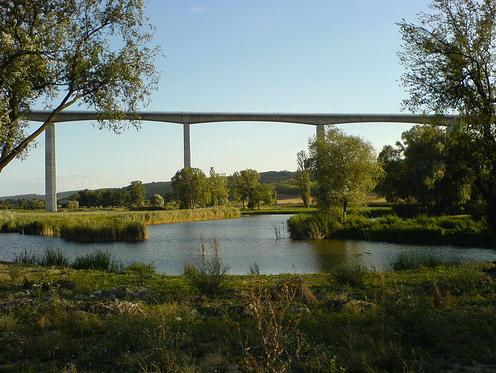
Halastó (English: Fishpond) in Kőröshegy

Kőröshegy lies 3 km far from the southern shore of Lake Balaton in the Kőröshegy Valley south of Balatonföldvár and Szántód. The landscape is dominated by the hills (part of the Transdanubian Hill Range). Its deepest point is at 106 m, the highest at 312 m (Gyugy-tető). The Jaba Crook runs through the village from the south to the north. Kőröshegy is part of the Balatonboglár Wine Region.

== History ==
=== Middle Ages ===
This place was already inhabited during prehistoric times. The name of the settlement was first mentioned in 1082 in an official decree in which Ladislaus I subordinated the village under the Archdiocese of Veszprém, meanwhile in the establishing charter of the abbey of Tihany (1055) this territory was under the supervision of the Benedictine Pannonhalma Abbey. The first was confirmed later by Pope Alexander III (1175) and Pope Urban II (1187). Pope Innocent III gave a part of Somogy County (including Kőröshegy) the Benedictines, but ecclesiastically to the Archdiocese of Veszprém.

Under the rule of Béla IV, Master Albeus wrote a list of the residents of Kőröshegy, therefore they are all known by names today. In 1376 the village was the seat of the cattle regency of Pannonhalma Abbey in Somogy County.

Since 1386 it was under royal possession. Sigismund awarded the whole village and the nearby Castle of Fehérkő to Miklós Pécznembéli Marczali and his brother. During the 15th century it was owned by the Báthory family and later by Lajos Perky, the cavalry captain of Slavonia.

Kőröshegy became a market town in the late Middle Ages. Before the arrival of the Turks Franciscans settled there. In 1532 12 Franciscans lived in Kőröshegy in their monastery. (Its ruins can be found on the court of the primary school.) During the Turkish times the Franciscans left this monastery and the building was used first as a Turkish school then as a stable.

=== Ottoman rule ===
Kőröshegy lost most of its residents and became a village again. Several people flew into the hills to Diós-völgy and Diós-oldal near Gyugy-puszta because of the harassment of the Turks. In 1563 only 30 tax payers lived there, in 1580 only 35. Hundred years later there were only 18 tay payers. The settlement came under the Sanjak of Törökkoppány in the Ottoman administration.

The Roman Catholic church was demolished by the Turks, only the walls stood. The residents rebuilt the church in 1671 after the end of the Ottoman times when people settled back to Kőröshegy.

=== Habsburg rule ===
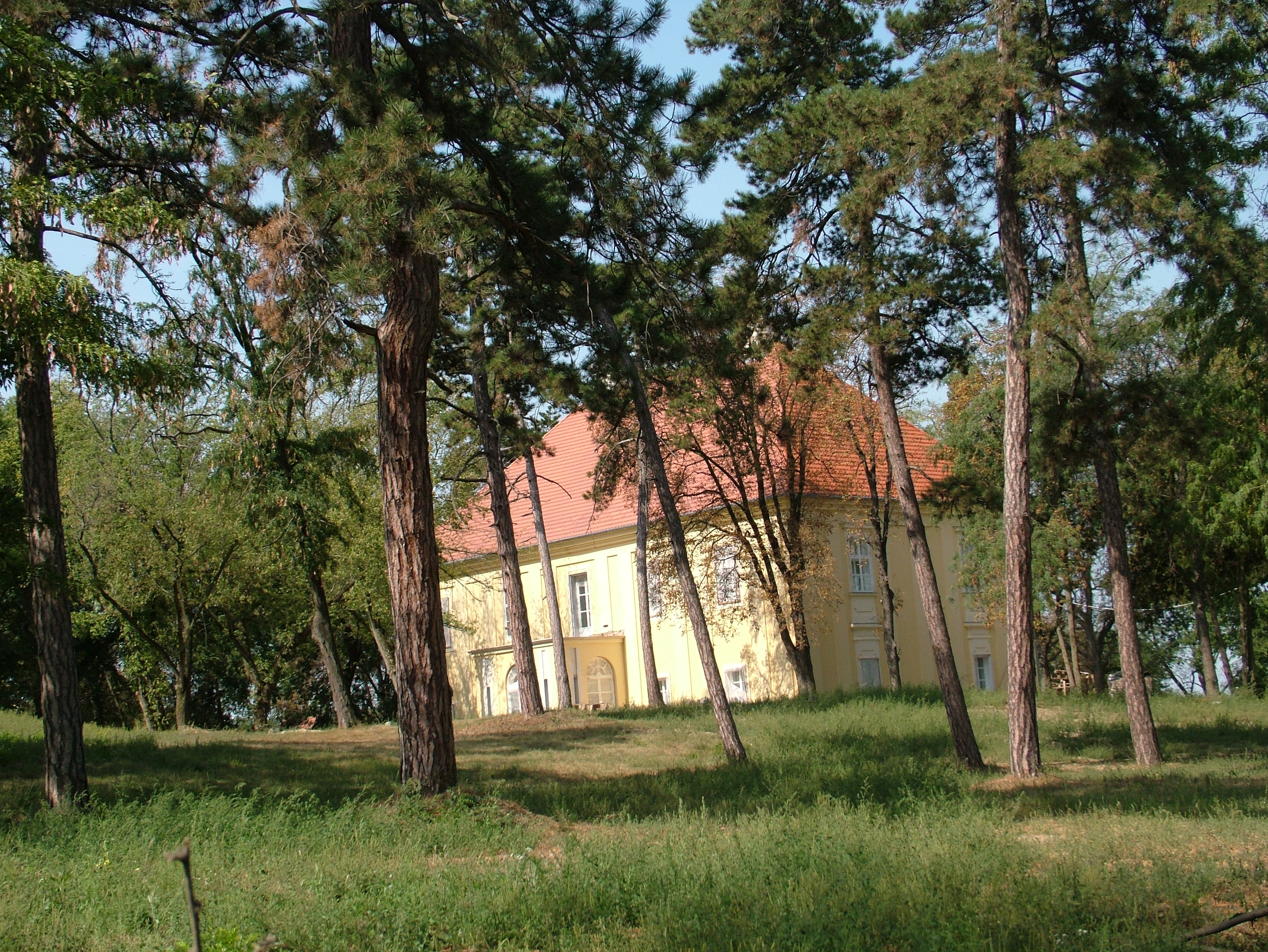
The Széchenyi Mansion

In the 17th century the village came under the possession of the Szécsényi family. In 1688 György Széchenyi, the chief captain of Egervár and Pölöske, refers to its mansion which had at that time just a ground level. The mansion was rebuilt in Baroque style in ca. 1780 adding a first floor above it. The Szécsényi family had an important role in vivifying the village. The majority of the population converted to Calvinism until that time. The Calvinists did not have their own church, therefore they were allowed to use the newly rebuilt church together with the Catholics until 1749. In 1759 the Catholics could establish their own parish. The Calvinists built their church in 1784, and in 1794 they expanded it with a wooden tower. Today's reformed church was built between 1813 and 1818.

During the Hungarian War of Independence some residents became soldiers. As the army of the pro-Habsburg Josip Jelačić passed through the village the residents inveigled the hostile soldiers in their cellars, where they gave them wine, then they killed them.

In the 19th century the village developed its industry, water mills and a brick factory were established. They continued to operate the at that time well-known traditional cooper guilds.

In 1862 there was a huge conflagration in Kőröshegy, when 43 houses were burnt down including the tower of the reformed church, the rectory and the apartment of the teacher and several others got damaged. In 8 years most buildings were renovated and rebuilt.

== Main sights ==
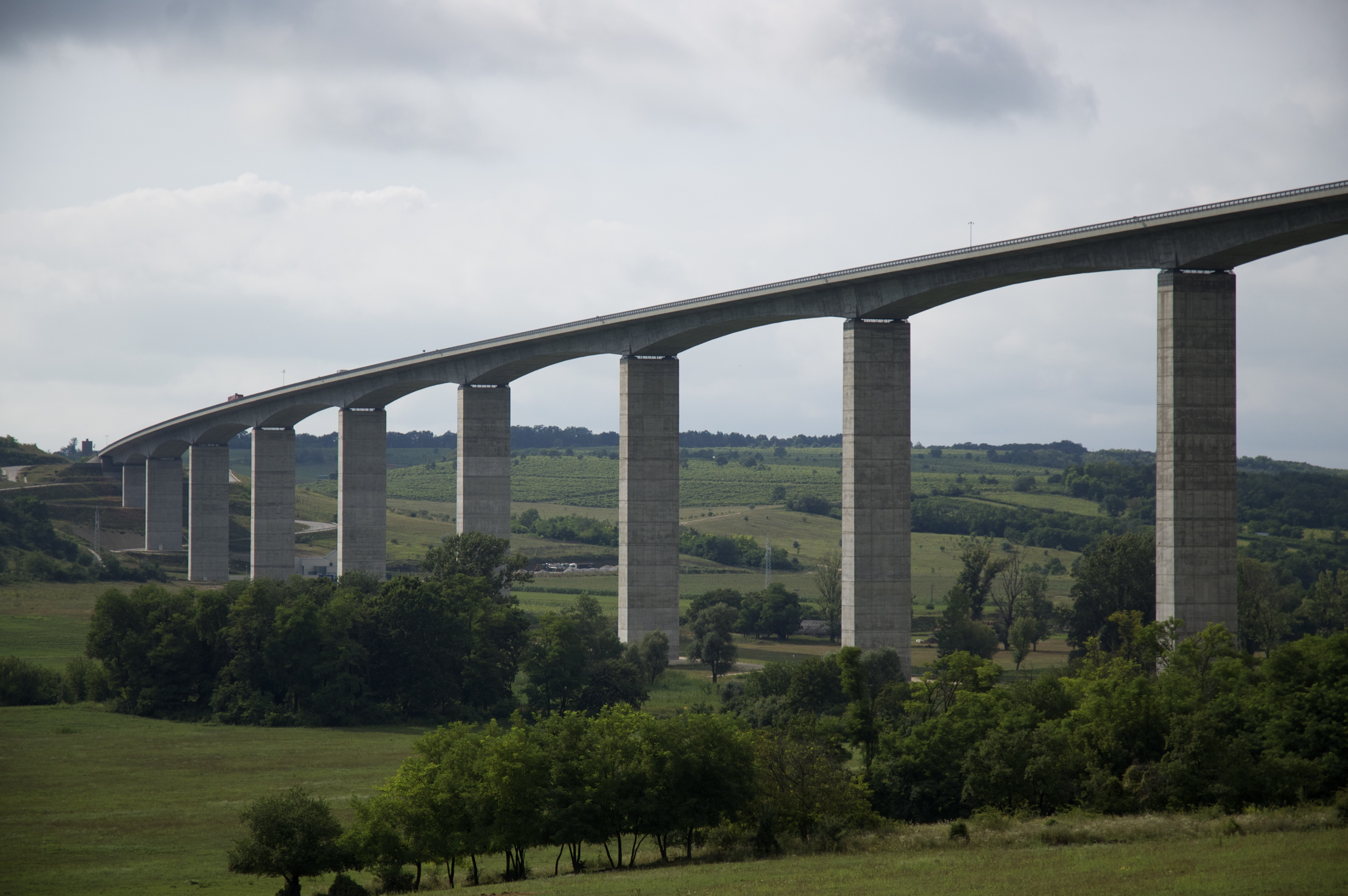
Viaduct of Kőröshegy

- Lavender of Kőröshegy
- Roman Catholic church (built in the late 15th century) - Gothic style church built by István Báthory
- Reformed church (built in 1818)
- Cellars in the side of the Öreg-hegy (English: Old Mountain)
- Széchenyi Mansion - was built in 1780 in Baroque style (Its most notable resident was Zsigmond Széchenyi who wrote his famous novel Csui there.)
- traditional peasant homes (e.g. 65 Petőfi Sándor utca (built ca. 1869), 29 Petőfi Sándor utca (built ca. 1850), 86 Kossuth Lajos utca) - Whitewashed, thatched, gable houses with columned, vaulted porch.
- Dézsma Cellar - used for wine storage since the Middle Ages (currently can not be visited)
- Viaduct of Kőröshegy on the M7 Motorway
- Turtle Park (Hungary's first turtle collection near Lake Balaton)

== Demographics ==
The majority of the residents are Hungarian (88.7%). Notable minorities are Germans (2.8%). Others are all under 1%. The religious affiliation of the population shows a massive Catholic (Roman Catholic (51.0%) and Greek Catholic (0.2%)) majority, a remarkable Calvinist (17.0%) and a smaller Lutheran (1.5%) minority. 12.6% belongs to no churches.

== Notable people ==
- Zsigmond Széchenyi (1898–1967), Hungarian author, hunter, traveler
- Sándor Kozma (1825–1897), first Hungarian public prosecutor, the founder of the Crown Chief Prosecutor's Office
- György Gaál (1814–1896), Hungarian Reformed pastor
- Rudolf Csepelyi (1920–2000), Hungarian author, poet, journalist
- Ottó Orsós (1911–1939), Hungarian botanist
- Péter Vépi (born 1949), Hungarian footballer
- Dávid Ferdős (Fördős) de Szenc (1787–1866), Hungarian Reformed pastor, teacher
- Lajos Fördős (1817–1884), Hungarian Reformed pastor, archdeacon, author, poet

== Gallery ==
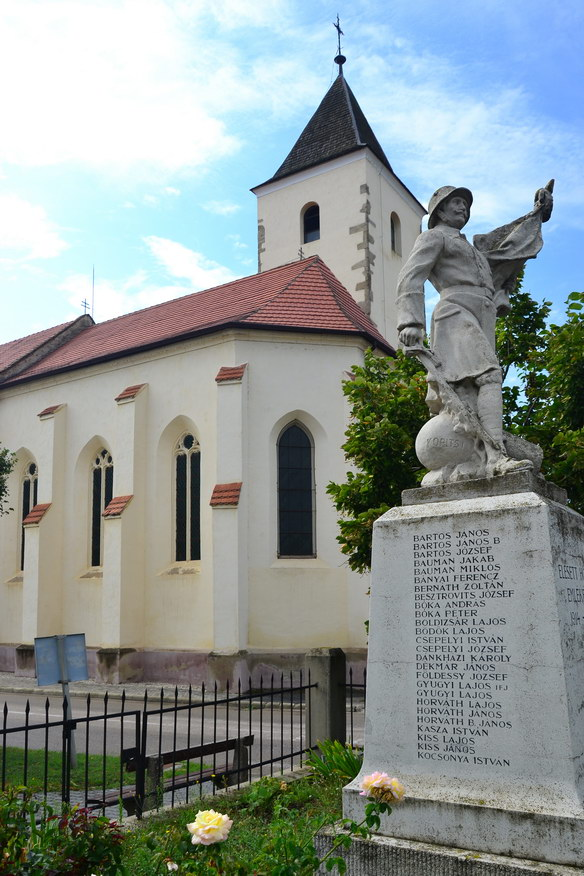
The Szent Kereszt-templom (English: Holy Cross Church) with the monument for those who died in the Second World War or in the Revolution of 1956

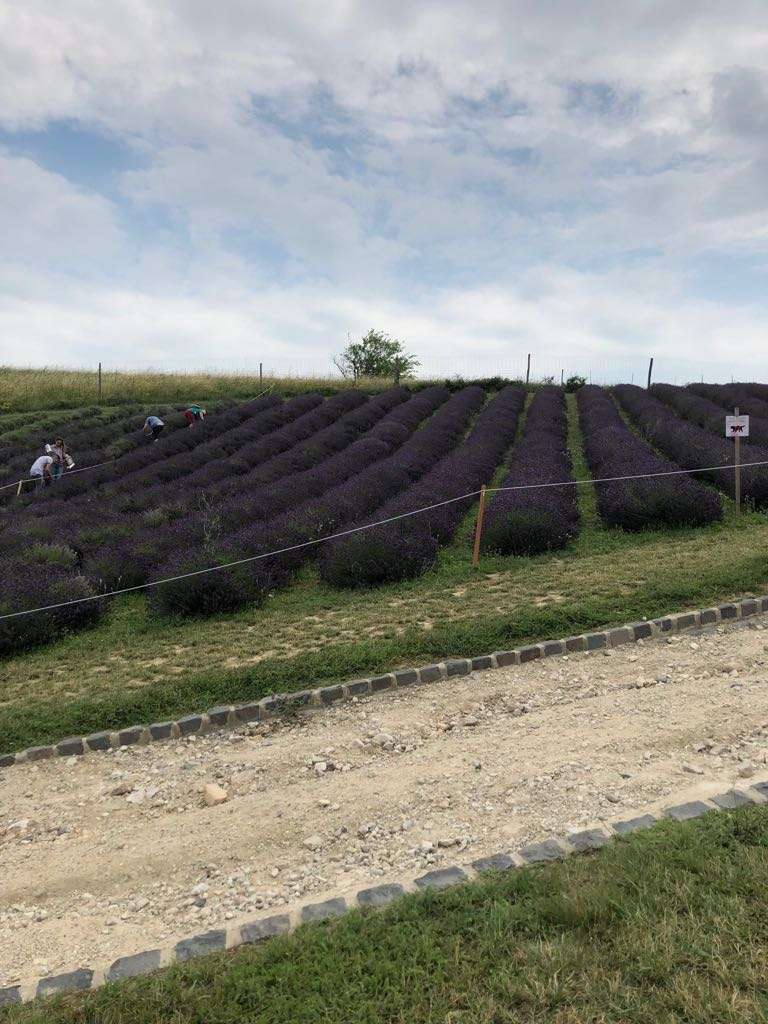
Lavender field in Kőröshegy

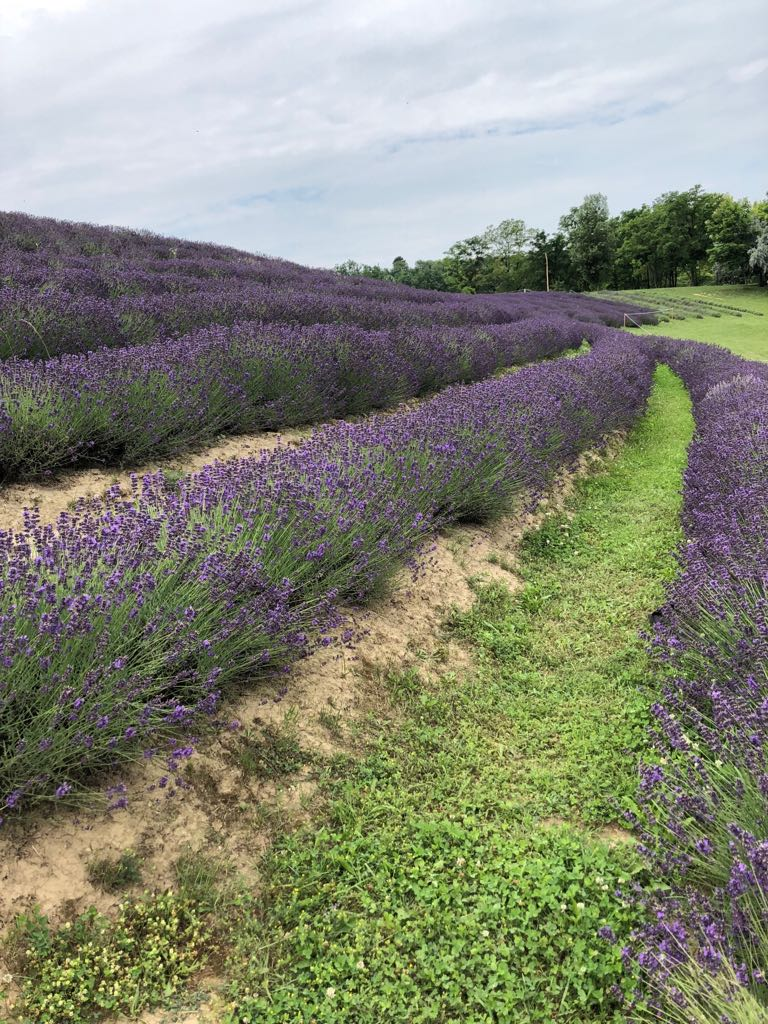
Lavender field in Kőröshegy

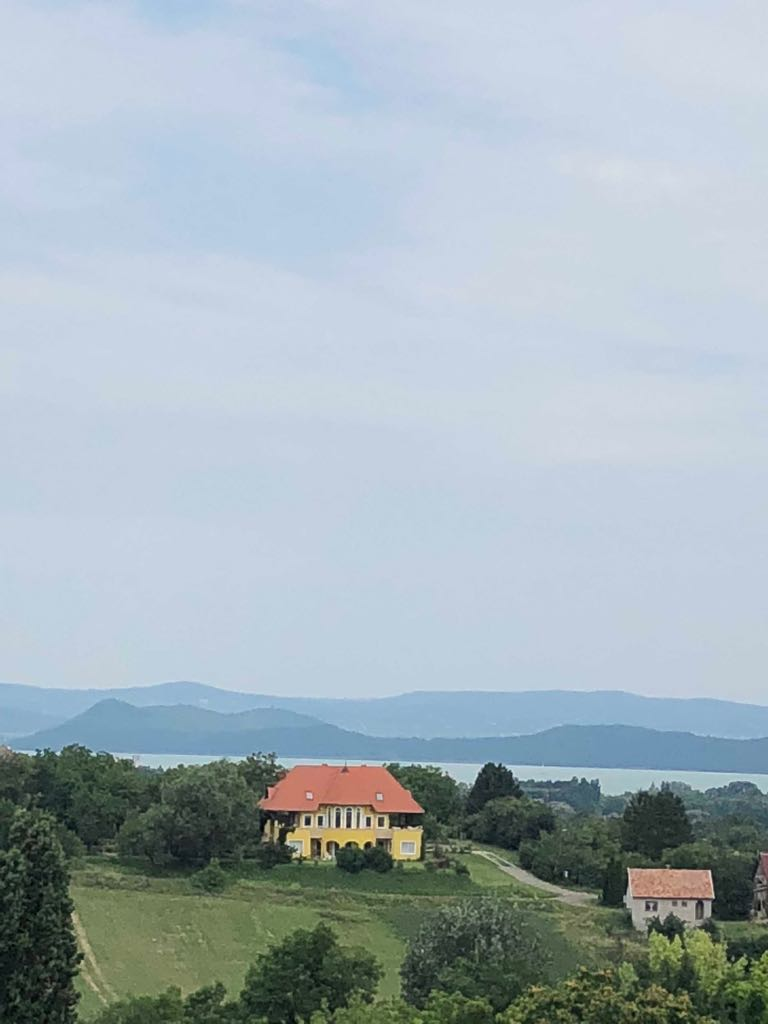
Panorama from the Kishegy of the Lake Balaton and the Tihany Peninsula

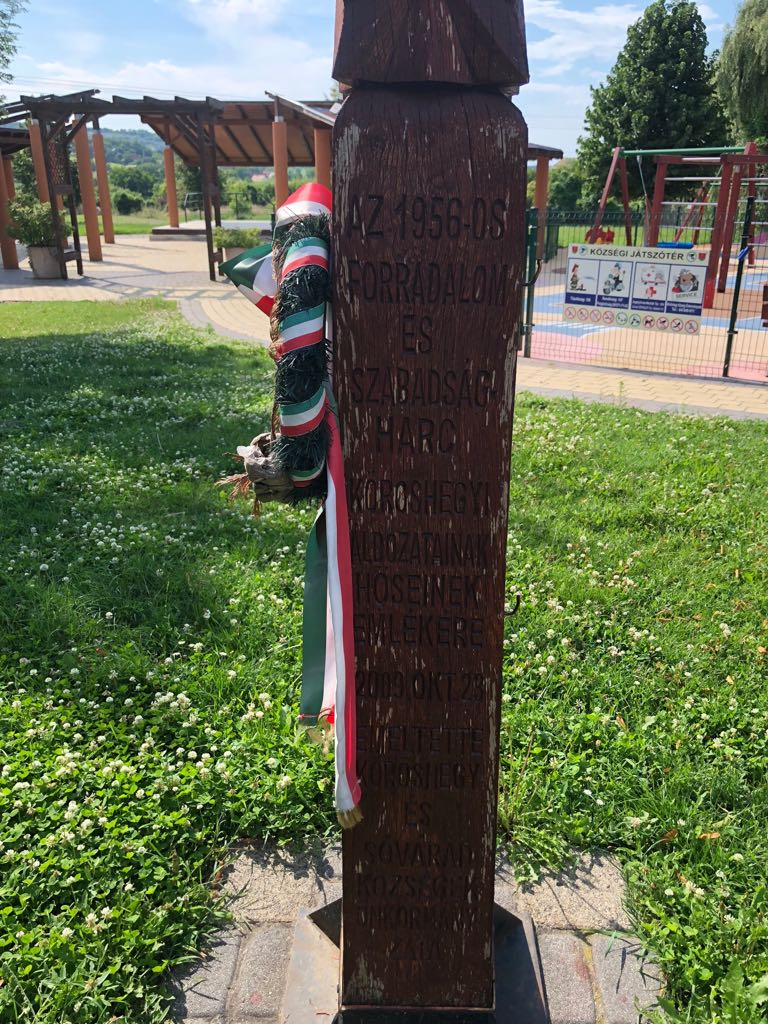
Headboard for the victims of the Second World War in Kőröshegy

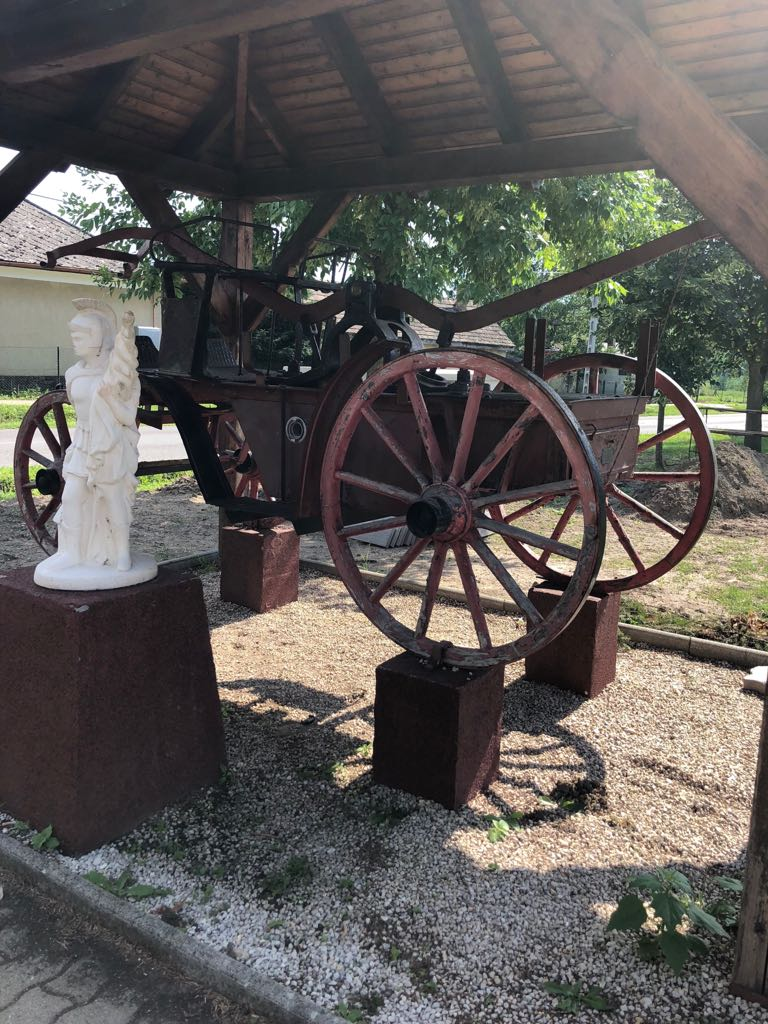
Firefighter cart in Kőröshegy

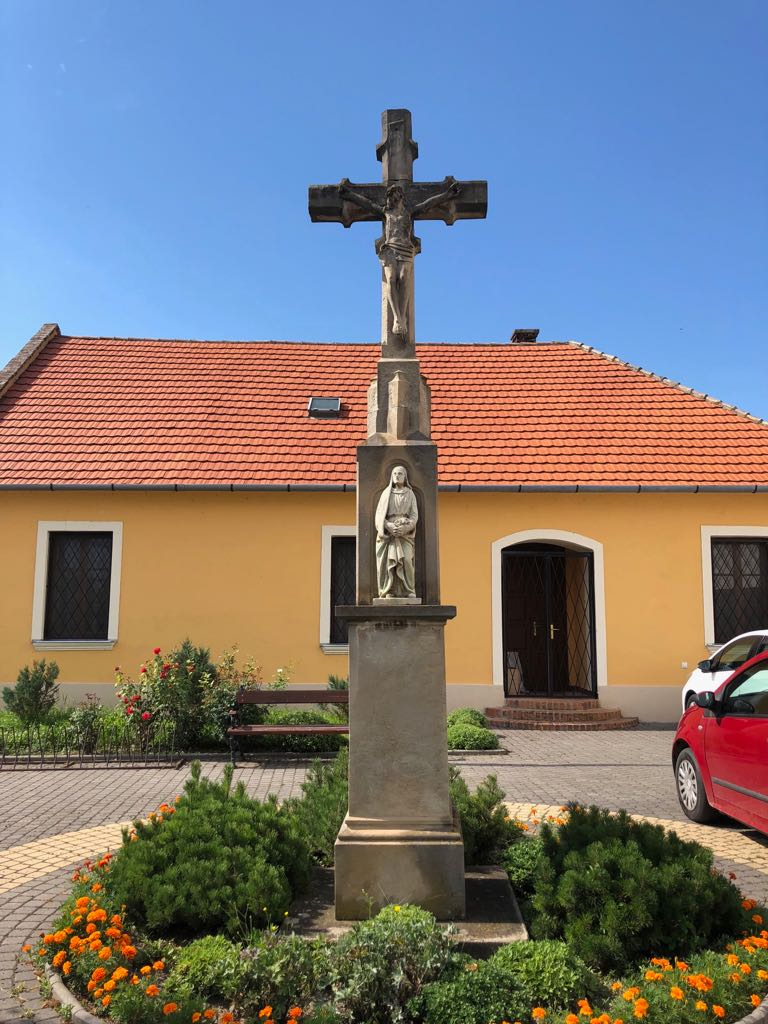
Holy Cross with Holy Mary in Kőröshegy

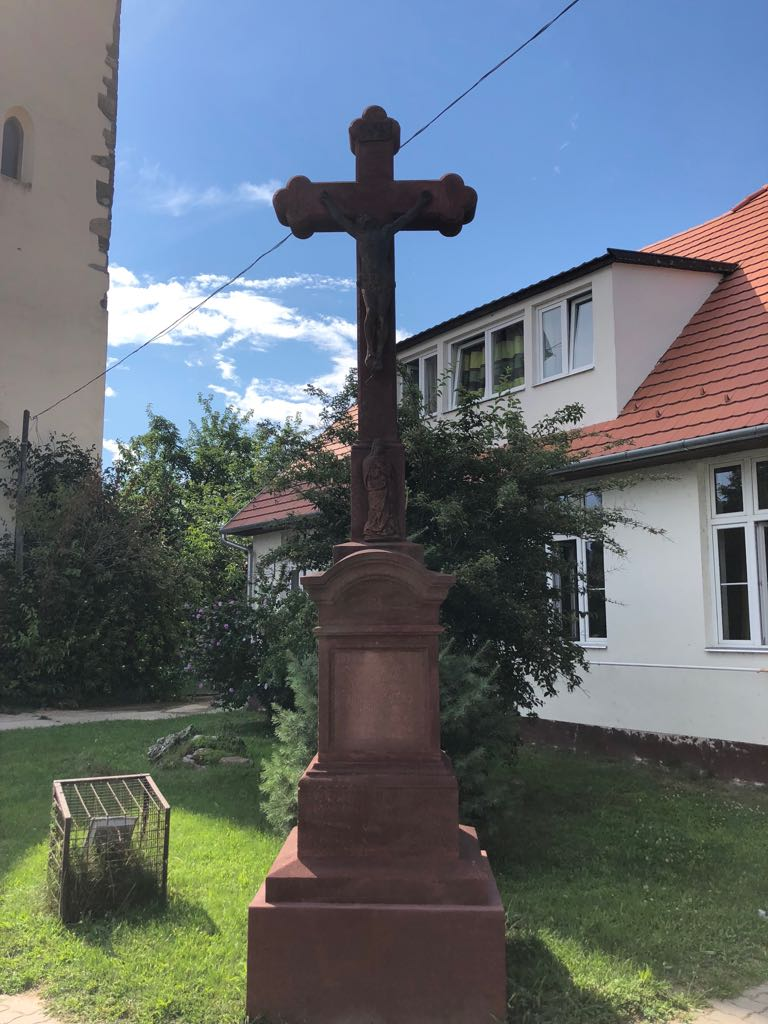
Holy Cross in Kőröshegy

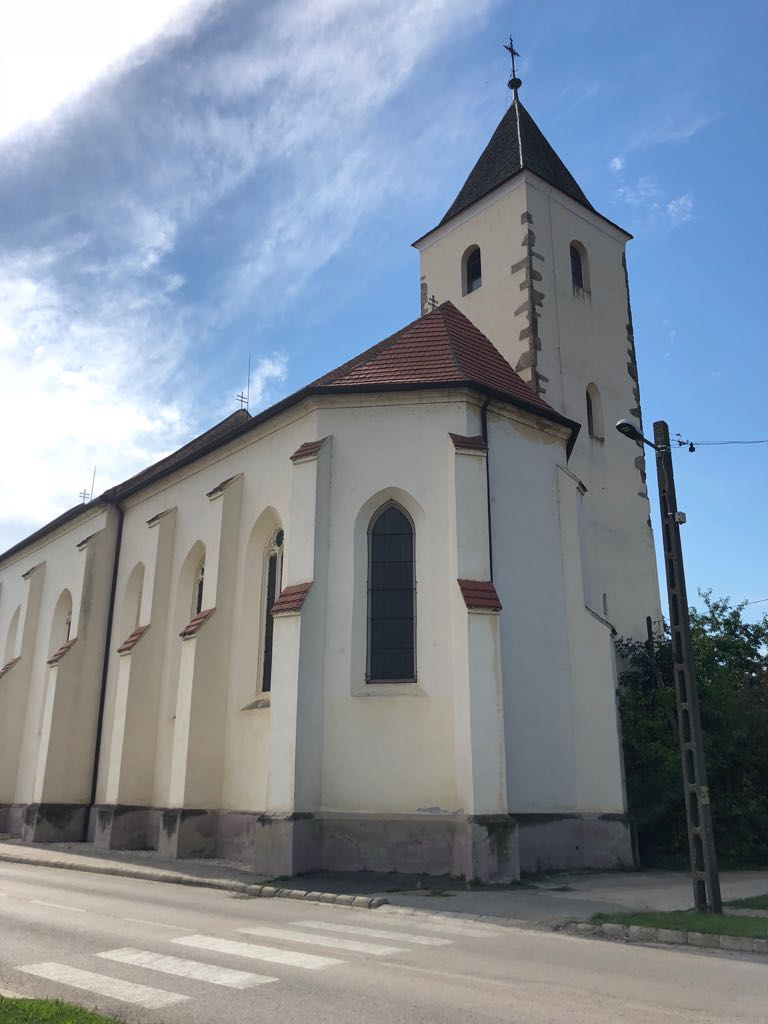
Roman Catholic Church in Kőröshegy

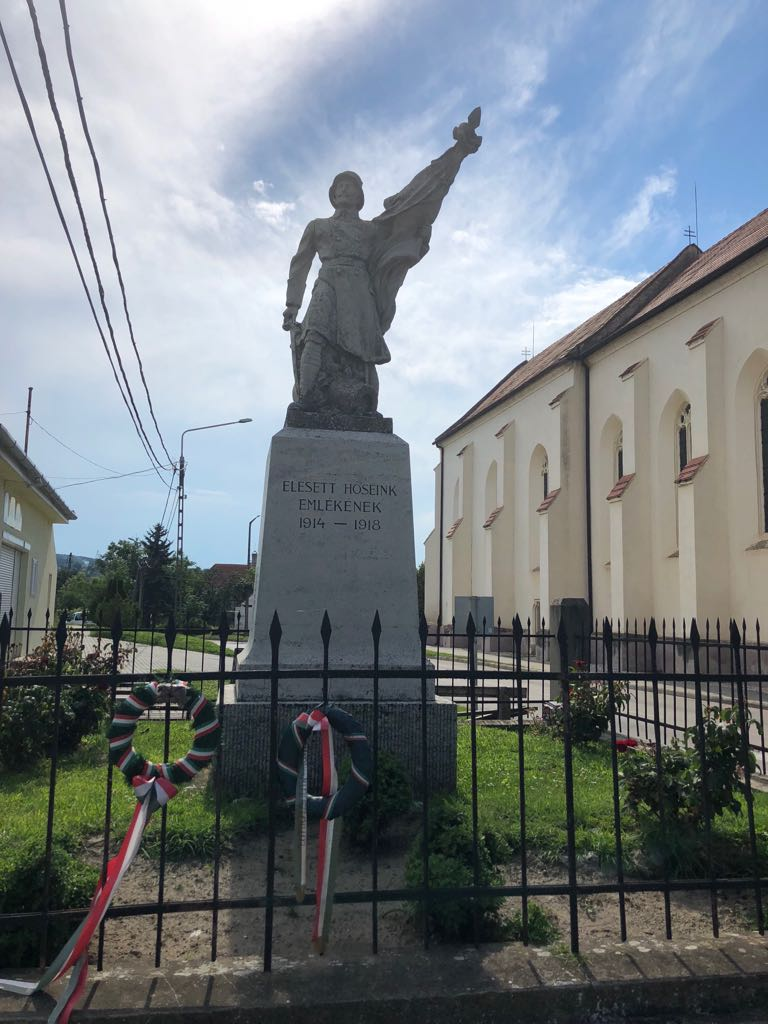
Monument of the Victims of the First World War in Kőröshegy

== Literature ==
- Kőröshegy-Műemlékek Tájak-Korok-Múzeumok Kiskönyvtár Nr 325 (1988)
- Ferenc Reöthy : Kőröshegy Kőröshegy Község Elöljáróságának kiadványa (Kőröshegy, 1990)
- Dezső Bunovácz : Magyarország régiói – Dél-Dunántúl – Somogy megye (Ceba Kiadó, 2004)
- Zsigmond Széchenyi : Ünnepnapok
- László Cs. Szabó : Balatoni képeslapok – Kőröshegy. In: Nyugat, 1940, Nr 9
