= Teleki (village) =

- Village
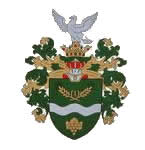
- Coat of arms

- Location of Somogy county in Hungary

- Location of Teleki (village)
- Coordinates: 46.77115°N 17.82564°E
- Country: Hungary
- Region: Southern Transdanubia
- County: Somogy
- District: Siófok
- RC Diocese: Kaposvár

Area
  - Total: 8.05 km^{2} (3.11 sq mi)

Population (2017)
  - Total: 210
  - Density: 26/km^{2} (68/sq mi)
- Demonym: teleki
- Time zone: UTC+1 (CET)
  - Summer (DST): UTC+2 (CEST)
- Postal code: 8626
- Area code: (+36) 84
- NUTS 3 code: HU232
- MP: Mihály Witzmann (Fidesz)
- Website: Teleki Online

Teleki is a village in Somogy county, Hungary, about 5 kilometres (3.1 mi) south of Lake Balaton.

The settlement is part of the Balatonboglár wine region.
