= Pusztaszemes =

- Village
- Coat of arms

- Location of Somogy county in Hungary

- Location of Pusztaszemes
- Coordinates: 46.77003°N 17.92505°E
- Country: Hungary
- Region: Southern Transdanubia
- County: Somogy
- District: Siófok
- RC Diocese: Kaposvár

Area
  - Total: 10.39 km^{2} (4.01 sq mi)

Population (2017)
  - Total: 338
  - Density: 39.84/km^{2} (103.2/sq mi)
- Demonym(s): szemesi, pusztaszemesi
- Time zone: UTC+1 (CET)
  - Summer (DST): UTC+2 (CEST)
- Postal code: 8619
- Area code: (+36) 84
- Patron Saint: Wendelin of Trier
- NUTS 3 code: HU232
- MP: Mihály Witzmann (Fidesz)

Pusztaszemes is a village in Somogy County, Hungary. It is known for being the birthplace of János Kádár's father, János Krezinger.

== Etymology ==
The name of Pusztaszemes originates from the words szem (English: grain, eye, core) and puszta because this area depopulated during the Turkish occupation. It is also possible that the village got its name after its first owner, a man called Szemes.

== Geography ==
It lies on the Outer Somogy Hill Range, 10 km south of Balatonföldvár, in the southern end of the Kőröshegy-Pusztaszemes Valley. The Brook Séd and Brook Jaba have their sources there. The first flows to the North in the Lake Balaton, the second to the South in the River Koppány.

== History ==
Pusztaszemes was first mentioned in 1229 as Scernes. I also appears in the papal tithe register between 1332 and 1337. In 1536 it was written as Waralyazemes (Waralya means Castle bottom). Ottoman Porte's tax register mentioned it initially, later it became uninhabited. After the Siege of Buda the Hungarian nobility invited Christian settlers (mostly Roman Catholic) to Hungary. Until 1778 several German families arrived to Pusztaszemes who rebuilt the village. The landowner was the Széchényi family, but several residents had smaller portions of lands. According to the 1853 census the village had 340 residents of which 258 were Germans and 82 Hungarians. Its Roman Catholic church was built in 1860 and was dedicated to Saint Wendelin.

== Main sights ==
- Roman Catholic Church - built in 1860 and dedicated to Saint Wendelin
- monument for the heroes of the First and the Second World War
- traditional houses
- house of János Krezinger, father of János Kádár - at the edge of the village next to the forest
