= Nagycsepely =

- Village
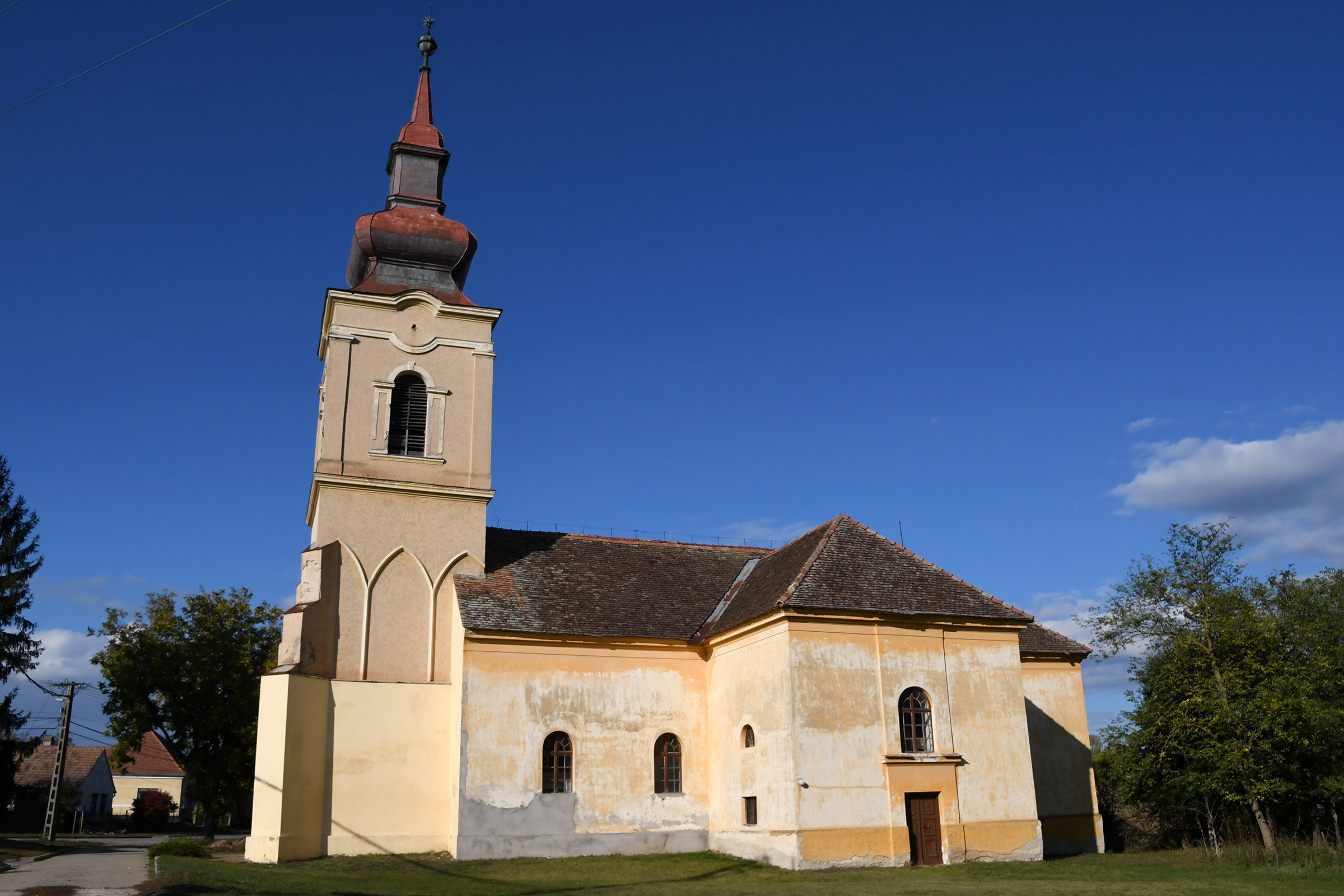
- Reformed church of Nagycsepely

- Coat of arms

- Location of Somogy county in Hungary

- Location of Nagycsepely
- Coordinates: 46.74962°N 17.83385°E
- Country: Hungary
- Region: Southern Transdanubia
- County: Somogy
- District: Siófok
- RC Diocese: Kaposvár

Area
  - Total: 19.8 km^{2} (7.6 sq mi)

Population (2017)
  - Total: 396
  - Density: 20.0/km^{2} (51.8/sq mi)
- Demonym: nagycsepelyi
- Time zone: UTC+1 (CET)
  - Summer (DST): UTC+2 (CEST)
- Postal code: 8628
- Area code: (+36) 84
- NUTS 3 code: HU232
- MP: Mihály Witzmann (Fidesz)

Nagycsepely is a village in Somogy county, Hungary.

== Etymology ==
Its name derives from the older Hungarian word csepely or cseplye (Hungarian: bokros, cserjés, English: bushy).
