= Szántód =

- Village
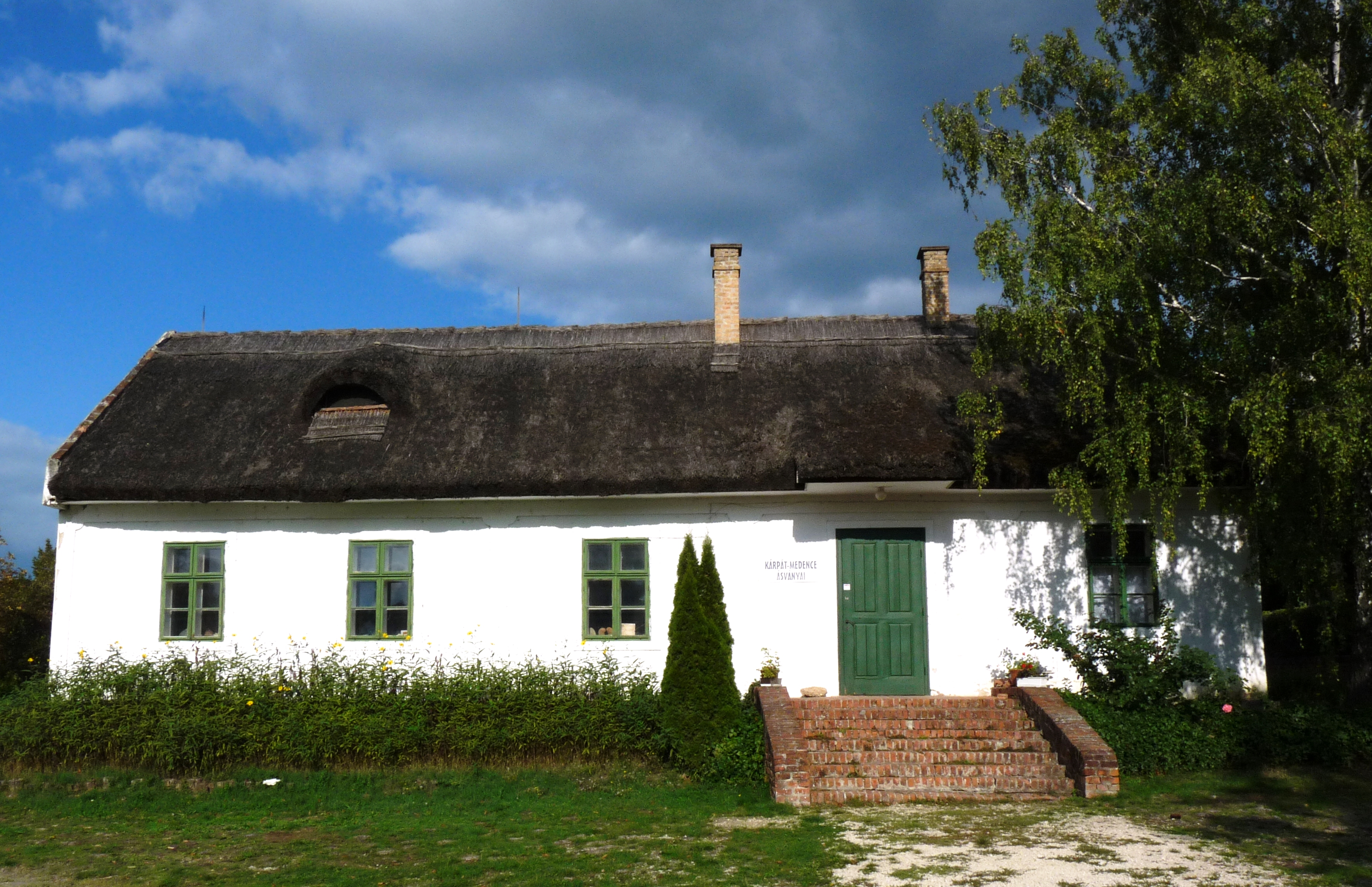
- Former maid house

- Coat of arms
- Nickname: Bridge of the Lake Balaton
- Location within Hungary
- Coordinates: 46.880508°N 17.944858°E
- Country: Hungary
- Region: Southern Transdanubia
- County: Somogy
- District: Siófok
- RC Diocese: Kaposvár
- Settled: 10th century
- Incorporated: 1997

Government
  - Mayor: János Dolgos (FIDESZ-KDNP)

Area
  - Total: 7.91 km^{2} (3.05 sq mi)
- Highest elevation: 208.2 m (683 ft)
- Lowest elevation: 104 m (341 ft)

Population (2017)
  - Total: 581
  - Density: 73.5/km^{2} (190/sq mi)
- Demonym: szántódi
- Time zone: UTC+1 (CET)
  - Summer (DST): UTC+2 (CEST)
- Postal code: 8622
- Area code: (+36) 84
- Patron Saint: Saint Christopher
- NUTS 3 code: HU232
- MP: Mihály Witzmann (Fidesz)
- Website: Szántód Online

Szántód is a village in Somogy county, Hungary situated between Balatonföldvár and Zamárdi on the shore of Lake Balaton. The village is known for its ferry, ferryboats, views of Tihany from Szántód and the Szántódpuszta Tourist and Cultural Center which is a village museum ("skanzen"). It is approximately 13.4 km from Siófok, the major town of the area, 65.8 km from Kaposvár, the capital of Somogy County and 117 km from Budapest, the capital of Hungary.
