= Somogy County 2nd constituency =

Constituency in Hungary (2012-)

Somogy County 2nd constituency (Barcs)
- Constituency for the National Assembly
- Location of Somogy county 02 within Somogy county

- Location of Somogy county within Hungary
- County: Somogy
- Electorate: 60,390 (2018)
- Major settlements: Barcs

Current constituency
- Created: 2011
- Party: Tisza Party
- Member: József Benke
- Elected: 2026

The 2nd constituency of Somogy County (Hungarian: Somogy megyei 02. számú országgyűlési egyéni választókerület) is one of the single member constituencies of the National Assembly, the national legislature of Hungary. The constituency standard abbreviation: Somogy 02. OEVK.

Since 2026, it has been represented by József Benke of the Tisza Party.

== Geography ==
The 2nd constituency is located in south-western part of Somogy County.

=== List of municipalities ===
The constituency includes the following municipalities:

1. Babócsa
2. Bakháza
3. Barcs
4. Bárdudvarnok
5. Bélavár
6. Beleg
7. Berzence
8. Bolhás
9. Bolhó
10. Csokonyavisonta
11. Csököly
12. Csurgó
13. Csurgónagymarton
14. Darány
15. Drávagárdony
16. Drávatamási
17. Gige
18. Görgeteg
19. Gyékényes
20. Háromfa
21. Hedrehely
22. Hencse
23. Heresznye
24. Homokszentgyörgy
25. Iharos
26. Iharosberény
27. Inke
28. Istvándi
29. Jákó
30. Kadarkút
31. Kálmáncsa
32. Kaposfő
33. Kastélyosdombó
34. Kaszó
35. Kisasszond
36. Kisbajom
37. Kiskorpád
38. Komlósd
39. Kőkút
40. Kutas
41. Lábod
42. Lad
43. Lakócsa
44. Mike
45. Nagyatád
46. Nagykorpád
47. Őrtilos
48. Ötvöskónyi
49. Patosfa
50. Péterhida
51. Pogányszentpéter
52. Porrog
53. Porrogszentkirály
54. Porrogszentpál
55. Potony
56. Rinyabesenyő
57. Rinyakovácsi
58. Rinyaszentkirály
59. Rinyaújlak
60. Rinyaújnép
61. Segesd
62. Somogyaracs
63. Somogybükkösd
64. Somogycsicsó
65. Somogyszob
66. Somogyudvarhely
67. Szabás
68. Szenta
69. Szentborbás
70. Szulok
71. Tarany
72. Tótújfalu
73. Vése
74. Visnye
75. Vízvár
76. Zákány
77. Zákányfalu

== Members ==
The constituency was first represented by László Szászfalvi of the KDNP from 2014, and he was re-elected in 2018. In the 2026 election, József Benke of the Tisza Party was elected representative.

Election	Member	Party	%
2014	László Szászfalvi	KDNP	
2018	László Szászfalvi	KDNP	
2022	László Szászfalvi	KDNP	57.9
2026	József Benke	TISZA	47.55
