= Potony =

Potony Potonja (in Croatian)
- Village
- Coat of arms

- Location of Somogy county in Hungary

- Location of Potony
- Coordinates: 45.93033°N 17.65060°E
- Country: Hungary
- Region: Southern Transdanubia
- County: Somogy
- District: Barcs
- RC Diocese: Pécs

Area
  - Total: 15.9 km^{2} (6.1 sq mi)

Population (2017)
  - Total: 176
  - Density: 11.1/km^{2} (28.7/sq mi)
- Demonym: potonyi
- Time zone: UTC+1 (CET)
  - Summer (DST): UTC+2 (CEST)
- Postal code: 7977
- Area code: (+36) 82
- NUTS 3 code: HU232
- MP: László Szászfalvi (KDNP)

Potony (Croatian: Potonja) is a village in Somogy County, Hungary.

== Geography ==
It lies east of Barcs, 4 km (2.5 mi) from the River Drava, on the border of Somogy and Baranya County. Neighboring villages are Kastélyosdombó, Lakócsa, Tótújfalu and Drávagárdony. The EuroVelo international cycling 13th Vasfüggöny trail runs through the settlement.

== History ==
Potony was first mentioned in the papal tithe register between 1332 and 1337 and already had its own parish. In 1376 it appeared as Poton, in 1403 as Szent-Pál Valley in official documents. There was also another village, Gerenda which perished after 1660. There were nine peasant families in the village in 1695. From the 18th century it was a possession of the Esterházy family who invited Croatian settlers there at that time from Slavonia. According to the 1772 census the residents of Potony spoke all Croatian. The 1870 census shows that it had 431 Croatian or Serb, 154 Hungarian, 1 German and 1 Slovak resident. The name Potony is since 1909 in use. It had 699 residents, 82% of whom were Croats.

== Economy ==
A 400,000 m^{3} reservoir is under construction as part of the Old-Drava Program.

== Main sights ==
- oak tree - symbol of the village, motive of the coat of arms
- Catholic Church - famous for its cassette ceiling and was built in 1937
- statue of the heroes of the Second World War (erected in 2000)
- Lug Forest - protected natural reserve between Potony and Tótújfalu
