= List of populated places in Hungary (D) =

This is a list of cities, towns and villages of Hungary

KEY: T = Town ; V = Village

Name	Rank	County	District	Population	Post code
Dabas	T	Pest	Dabasi	16,018	2370
Dabronc	V	Veszprém	Sümegi	497	8345
Dabrony	V	Veszprém	Ajkai	403	8485
Dad	V	Komárom-Esztergom	Oroszlányi	1,093	2854
Dág	V	Komárom-Esztergom	Dorogi	993	2522
Dáka	V	Veszprém	Pápai	622	8592
Dalmand	V	Tolna	Dombóvári	1,470	7211
Damak	V	Borsod-Abaúj-Zemplén	Edelényi	245	3780
Dámóc	V	Borsod-Abaúj-Zemplén	Bodrogközi	442	3978
Dánszentmiklós	V	Pest	Ceglédi	2,691	2735
Dány	V	Pest	Gödölloi	4,249	2118
Daraboshegy	V	Tolna	Körmendi	105	9917
Darány	V	Somogy	Barcsi	1,006	7988
Darnó	V	Szabolcs-Szatmár-Bereg	Fehérgyarmati	160	4737
Darnózseli	V	Gyor-Moson-Sopron	Mosonmagyaróvári	1,603	9232
Daruszentmiklós	V	Fejér	Dunaújvárosi	1,347	2423
Darvas	V	Hajdú-Bihar	Berettyóújfalui	677	4144
Dávod	V	Bács-Kiskun	Bajai	2,227	6524
Debercsény	V	Nógrád	Balassagyarmati	100	2694
Debrecen	county seat	Hajdú-Bihar	Debreceni	205,881	4000^{*}
Debréte	V	Borsod-Abaúj-Zemplén	Edelényi	34	3825
Decs	V	Tolna	Szekszárdi	4,302	7144
Dédestapolcsány	V	Borsod-Abaúj-Zemplén	Kazincbarcikai	1,641	3643
Dég	V	Fejér	Enyingi	2,373	8135
Dejtár	V	Nógrád	Balassagyarmati	1,505	2649
Délegyháza	V	Pest	Ráckevei	2,532	2337
Demecser	T	Szabolcs-Szatmár-Bereg	Ibrány–Nagyhalászi	4,551	4516
Demjén	V	Heves	Egri	2,509	3395
Dencsháza	V	Baranya	Szigetvári	622	7915
Dénesfa	V	Gyor-Moson-Sopron	Kapuvári	390	9365
Derecske	T	Hajdú-Bihar	Derecske–Létavértesi	9,297	4130
Derekegyház	V	Csongrád	Szentesi	1,851	6621
Deszk	V	Csongrád	Szegedi	3,392	6772
Detek	V	Borsod-Abaúj-Zemplén	Encsi	326	3834
Detk	V	Heves	Gyöngyösi	2,809	3275
Dévaványa	T	Békés	Szeghalmi	8,895	5510
Devecser	T	Veszprém	Ajkai	5,211	8460
Dinnyeberki	V	Baranya	Szentlorinci	115	7683
Diósberény	V	Tolna	Tamási	403	7072
Diósd	V	Pest	Budaörsi	6,307	2049
Diósjeno	V	Nógrád	Rétsági	2,864	2643
Dióskál	V	Zala	Keszthely–Hévízi	533	8764
Diósviszló	V	Baranya	Siklósi	716	7817
Doba	V	Veszprém	Ajkai	586	8482
Doboz	V	Békés	Békéscsabai	4,564	5624
Dobri	V	Zala	Lenti	211	8874
Dobronhegy	V	Zala	Zalaegerszegi	159	8917
Dóc	V	Csongrád	Szegedi	806	6766
Domaháza	V	Borsod-Abaúj-Zemplén	Ózdi	990	3627
Domaszék	V	Csongrád	Szegedi	4,426	6781
Dombegyház	V	Békés	Mezokovácsházi	2,410	5836
Dombiratos	V	Békés	Mezokovácsházi	752	5745
Dombóvár	T	Tolna	Dombóvári	20,841	7200
Dombrád	T	Szabolcs-Szatmár-Bereg	Kisvárdai	4,269	4492
Domony	V	Pest	Aszódi	2,005	2182
Domoszló	V	Heves	Gyöngyösi	4,022	3263
Dormánd	V	Heves	Füzesabonyi	2,006	3374
Dorog	T	Komárom-Esztergom	Dorogi	12,636	2510
Dorogháza	V	Nógrád	Bátonyterenyei	1,266	3153
Dozmat	V	Tolna	Szombathelyi	179	9791
Döbörhegy	V	Tolna	Körmendi	202	9914
Döbröce	V	Zala	Zalaszentgróti	94	8357
Döbrököz	V	Tolna	Dombóvári	2,163	7228
Döbrönte	V	Veszprém	Pápai	268	8597
Döge	V	Szabolcs-Szatmár-Bereg	Kisvárdai	2,237	4495
Dömös	V	Komárom-Esztergom	Esztergomi	1,120	2027
Dömsöd	V	Pest	Ráckevei	5,777	2344
Dör	V	Gyor-Moson-Sopron	Csornai	608	9147
Dörgicse	V	Veszprém	Balatonfüredi	269	8244
Döröske	V	Vas	Körmendi	115	9913
Dötk	V	Zala	Zalaszentgróti	28	8799
Dövény	V	Borsod-Abaúj-Zemplén	Kazincbarcikai	286	3721
Drágszél	V	Bács-Kiskun	Kalocsai	394	6342
Drávacsehi	V	Baranya	Siklósi	251	7851
Drávacsepely	V	Baranya	Siklósi	238	7846
Drávafok	V	Baranya	Sellyei	541	7967
Drávagárdony	V	Somogy	Barcsi	164	7977
Drávaiványi	V	Baranya	Sellyei	246	7960
Drávakeresztúr	V	Baranya	Sellyei	163	7967
Drávapalkonya	V	Baranya	Siklósi	277	7851
Drávapiski	V	Baranya	Siklósi	97	7843
Drávaszabolcs	V	Baranya	Siklósi	711	7851
Drávaszerdahely	V	Baranya	Siklósi	199	7847
Drávasztára	V	Baranya	Sellyei	442	7960
Drávatamási	V	Somogy	Barcsi	370	7979
Drégelypalánk	V	Nógrád	Balassagyarmati	1,680	2646
Dubicsány	V	Borsod-Abaúj-Zemplén	Ózdi	314	3635
Dudar	V	Veszprém	Zirci	1,726	8416
Duka	V	Vas	Celldömölki	277	9556
Dunaalmás	V	Komárom-Esztergom	Tatai	1,698	2545
Dunabogdány	V	Pest	Szentendrei	3,012	2023
Dunaegyháza	V	Bács-Kiskun	Kunszentmiklói	1,536	6323
Dunafalva	V	Bács-Kiskun	Bajai	1,003	7713
Dunaföldvár	T	Tolna	Paksi	9,286	7020
Dunaharaszti	T	Pest	Ráckevei	16,468	2330
Dunakeszi	T	Pest	Dunakeszi	29,430	2120
Dunakiliti	V	Gyor-Moson-Sopron	Mosonmagyaróvári	1,761	9225
Dunapataj	V	Bács-Kiskun	Kalocsai	3,673	6328
Dunaremete	V	Gyor-Moson-Sopron	Mosonmagyaróvári	248	9235
Dunaszeg	V	Gyor-Moson-Sopron	Gyori	1,729	9174
Dunaszekcso	V	Baranya	Mohácsi	2,191	7712
Dunaszentbenedek	V	Bács-Kiskun	Kalocsai	955	6333
Dunaszentgyörgy	V	Tolna	Paksi	2,661	7135
Dunaszentmiklós	V	Komárom-Esztergom	Tatai	423	2897
Dunaszentpál	V	Gyor-Moson-Sopron	Gyori	646	9175
Dunasziget	V	Gyor-Moson-Sopron	Mosonmagyaróvári	1,463	9226
Dunatetétlen	V	Bács-Kiskun	Kalocsai	603	6325
Dunaújváros	city w. county rights	Fejér	Dunaújvárosi	52,794	2400
Dunavarsány	V	Pest	Ráckevei	6,022	2336
Dunavecse	V	Bács-Kiskun	Kunszentmiklói	4,237	6087
Dusnok	V	Bács-Kiskun	Kalocsai	3,285	6353
Dúzs	V	Tolna	Tamási	325	7224

== Notes ==
- Cities marked with * have several different post codes, the one here is only the most general one.
