= Lakócsa =

Lakócsa Lukovišće / Lukovišče (in Croatian)
- Village
- Coat of arms

- Location of Somogy county in Hungary

- Location of Lakócsa
- Coordinates: 45.89650°N 17.69043°E
- Country: Hungary
- Region: Southern Transdanubia
- County: Somogy
- District: Barcs
- RC Diocese: Pécs

Area
  - Total: 25.32 km^{2} (9.78 sq mi)

Population (2017)
  - Total: 525
  - Density: 20.7/km^{2} (53.7/sq mi)
- Demonym: lakócsai
- Time zone: UTC+1 (CET)
  - Summer (DST): UTC+2 (CEST)
- Postal code: 7918
- Area code: (+36) 82
- NUTS 3 code: HU232
- MP: László Szászfalvi (KDNP)

Lakócsa (Croatian: Lukovišće / Lukovišče) is a village in Somogy County, Hungary.

== Geography ==
It is located near the River Drava, southeast of Barcs, south of Szigetvár and west of Sellye, in approximately the same distance from all the three towns, about 15 kilometers away.

Its neighbors are from north Teklafalu and Endrőc, from east Drávafok, from south Felsőszentmárton, from southwest Szentborbás, from west Tótújfalu and from northwest Potony.

== History ==
The settlement was first mentioned in 1565–1566 in the Turkish treasury dispatch list as Lankofcse. In 1571 there were only 5 tax payers of the Ottoman Porte in the village. In 1660 the Pannonhalma Abbey mentioned Lakócsa as the possession of the Custodiatus of the Diocese of Székesfehérvár. In 1715 the village was owned by the Zselicszentjakab Abbey. In 1748 it came under the rule of the treasury of the Habsburg Empire. According to the 1849 census it had 804 Roman Catholic Croatian residents. There was a huge conflagration in 1863 when half of the houses of Lakócsa burnt down. The settlement was known for its cattle and beef.

== Main sights ==
- Roman Catholic Church (built in 1723)
- Croatian Traditional Country House
