= Heresznye =

Heresznye Rasinja (in Croatian)
- Village
- Coat of arms

- Location of Somogy county in Hungary

- Location of Heresznye
- Coordinates: 46.05362°N 17.27631°E
- Country: Hungary
- Region: Southern Transdanubia
- County: Somogy
- District: Barcs
- RC Diocese: Kaposvár

Area
  - Total: 9.9 km^{2} (3.8 sq mi)

Population (2017)
  - Total: 203
  - Density: 21/km^{2} (53/sq mi)
- Demonym: heresznyei
- Time zone: UTC+1 (CET)
  - Summer (DST): UTC+2 (CEST)
- Postal code: 7587
- Area code: (+36) 82
- Patron saint: Saint Stephen of Hungary
- NUTS 3 code: HU232
- MP: László Szászfalvi (KDNP)
- Website: Heresznye Online

Heresznye (Croatian: Rasinja) is a village in Somogy county, Hungary.

== Etymology ==
The name comes from Slavic *Chrasňa<Chrastňa or *Chrasna<*Chrastna, see i.e. Chrastné (Slovakia), Chrastná (Czech Republic) or Hrasno (Bosnia and Herzegovina). Chrast (Proto-Slavic chvorstь): desne bush, deadwood. Chrastna: an area covered by "chrast".

== Geography ==
It lies south of Nagyatád, near the River Drava, between Vízvár and Bolhó.

== History ==
Heresznye was first mentioned in 1219 as Haraznia iuxta Dravam in official documents. Later, between 1332 and 1337 in the papal tithe register it can be found with its own parish. In 1384 there were two villages with the name Heresznye. The first one, Egyházasheresnye belonged to the Diocese of Székesfehérvár. The second one, Felrétheresnye was owned by the Bánfi family of Alsólendva and later by the Marczali family, then the Báthori family in 1495. According to the 1536 tax register Felsőheresznye belonged to Bálint Török, Alsóheresznye to András Báthori and the local priest. In 1550 Felső-Heresznye is owned by Ferenc Tahy, Bolhó-Heresznye by András Báthori. In the tax register of Pannonhalma Abbey from 1660 mentioned the settlement under the suzerainty of Szent-Györgyvár. György Széchényi Archbishop of Kalocsa got the village from Leopold I in 1677. During the Turkish occupation its population died or flew away.

In 1726 and in 1733 it was already uninhabited and belonged to Zsigmond Széchényi. From 1750 it is again an independent village. The Széchényi family decided to settle Croats from Slavonia to revive Heresznye. There was a huge conflagration when two-thirds of the houses of Heresznye burnt down. At the beginning of the 20th century Ödön Solymossy was its owner. According to the 1910 census out of its 715 residents 87 were Hungarian and 628 Croat, furthermore 707 Roman Catholic and 6 Jew.

== Main sights ==
- Roman Catholic church - built in 1935 and was dedicated to Saint Stephen of Hungary
