= Tótújfalu =

Tótújfalu Novo Selo (in Croatian)
- Village
- Coat of arms

- Location of Tótújfalu
- Coordinates: 45.90207°N 17.64511°E
- Country: Hungary
- Region: Southern Transdanubia
- County: Somogy
- District: Barcs
- RC Diocese: Pécs

Area
  - Total: 13.27 km^{2} (5.12 sq mi)

Population (2017)
  - Total: 199
  - Density: 15.0/km^{2} (38.8/sq mi)
- Demonym(s): tótújfalui, tótújfalusi
- Time zone: UTC+1 (CET)
  - Summer (DST): UTC+2 (CEST)
- Postal code: 7918
- Area code: (+36) 82
- NUTS 3 code: HU232
- MP: László Szászfalvi (KDNP)

Tótújfalu (Croatian: Novo Selo) is a village in Somogy county, Hungary.

== Geography ==
It lies in the southern part of Somogy County, southeast of Barcs, next to the Drava River and the Croatian border. Neighboring settlements are Lakócsa, Szentborbás and Potony.

The EuroVelo International Bicycle Route 13, "Iron Curtain" passes through Tótújfalu.

== History ==
In the Middle Ages the village was part of Barcs and its residents paid the tithe to the Pannonhalma Abbey. It was first mentioned in 1660 as the possession of the Istvánffy family and the Custodiatus of the Diocese of Székesfehérvár. Its church was built in the 15th century in Gothic style and was later rebuilt in 1750 in Baroque style.

It perished once before 1715. In 1715 there were only five households. Then Slovaks settled there. However because of the migratory movements in the region in 1725 Tótújfalu is already Croatian and Šokci dominant. They elected their own judge, Thomo Vrovicz in the same year. In 1726 it came under the ownership of the Zselicszentjakab Abbey. According to the 1772 county census its population spoke already Croatian. The culture of the local Croatian people can be viewed in the country house of the neighboring village, Lakócsa.

== Notable residents ==
- Mary Helen Stefaniak, American writer of Croatian-Hungarian descent
