= Vízvár =

Vízvár Izvar (in Croatian)
- Village
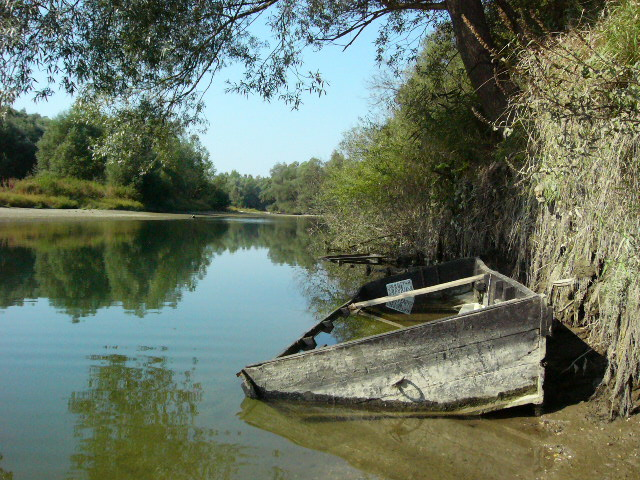
- River Drava at Vízvár

- Coat of arms

- Location of Somogy county in Hungary

- Location of Vízvár
- Coordinates: 46.09123°N 17.23903°E
- Country: Hungary
- Region: Southern Transdanubia
- County: Somogy
- District: Barcs
- RC Diocese: Kaposvár

Area
  - Total: 32.24 km^{2} (12.45 sq mi)

Population (2017)
  - Total: 520
  - Density: 16/km^{2} (42/sq mi)
- Demonym: vízvári
- Time zone: UTC+1 (CET)
  - Summer (DST): UTC+2 (CEST)
- Postal code: 7588
- Area code: (+36) 82
- NUTS 3 code: HU232
- MP: László Szászfalvi (KDNP)
- Website: Vízvár Online

Vízvár (Croatian: Izvar) is a village in Somogy County, Hungary. Zsitvapuszta and Csütörtökhely are parts of the settlement.

== Geography ==
It lies northwest of Barcs, along the Gyékényes-Pécs Railway Line. Its surroundings are part of the Duna-Dráva National Park.

== History ==
Ferenc Tahy built a castle on the banks of the River Drava on a place protected by marsh and water. Miklós Zrínyi urged the installation of a mercenary guard of the castle in his letters on November 17, 1555. But after the Fall of Szigetvár its defenders left the fortress, moreover they set it on fire. The population fled into the rest of the country to be save for the Turks. Vízvár stayed uninhabited for 150 years.

In 1720, several years after the Treaty of Karlowitz the settlement had 300 peasant fields. At that time Zsitfapuszta and Csütörtökhely were already part of Vízvár, however the second had still his own parish.

From 1733 the Festetics family owned the village until the 20th century. During the 18th century Croatian settlers arrived from the other side of the River Drava. According to records they all speak Croatian and had their own Catholic priest. They established their first school in 1742. In the middle of the 19th century it had 800 residents. In 1881 almost 1000 people lived there of which the half were already Hungarian.

The cultural life started to flourish in the 20th century when the population reached 1500. Reading, farming clubs, a library and a cultural house were established. In the First World War 45 and in the Second World War 35 residents died. For their memory the village raised a monument and a plaque in 1989.

=== Zsitfapuszta ===
Zsitfapuszta was first mentioned in 1399 as Sikfa as the land of the Diocese of Székesfehérvár. In the second half of the 15th century the Thúz de Lak family owned it. Between 1484 and 1500 the settlement belonged to Lak. Later its owner was Ferenc Tahy in 1550, then Herkules Lajos Turinetti in 1726 and Kristóf Festetics in 1733. From that time on it stayed in the hand of the Festetics family.

=== Csütörtökhely ===
Csütrörtökhely was first mentioned between 1332 and 1337 in the papal tithe registration with its parish.

== Main sights ==
- Festetics Mansion
- Roman Catholic Church (dedicated to John of Nepomuk)
