= Szulok =

Szulok Sulk (in German) Suljok (in Croatian)
- Village
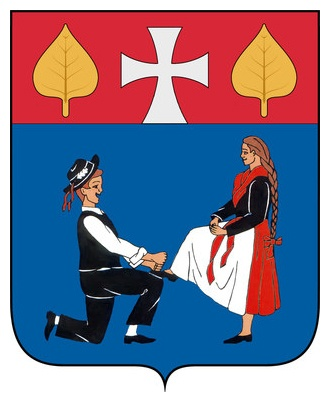
- Coat of arms

- Location of Somogy county in Hungary

- Location of Szulok
- Coordinates: 46.05267°N 17.54839°E
- Country: Hungary
- Region: Southern Transdanubia
- County: Somogy
- District: Barcs
- RC Diocese: Kaposvár
- Market town: 1811

Area
  - Total: 27.9 km^{2} (10.8 sq mi)

Population (2017)
  - Total: 656
  - Density: 23.5/km^{2} (60.9/sq mi)
- Demonym: szuloki
- Time zone: UTC+1 (CET)
  - Summer (DST): UTC+2 (CEST)
- Postal code: 7539
- Area code: (+36) 82
- NUTS 3 code: HU232
- MP: László Szászfalvi (KDNP)
- Website: Szulok Online

Szulok (German: Sulk, Croatian: Suljok) is a village in Somogy county, Hungary.

== Etymology ==
Its name derives from a South Slavic person name Sulko or Sulek. He could be the first owner of the village.

== Geography ==
It lies on the southern side of Somogy County, 14 km northeast of Barcs, on the road between Barcs and Kaposvár.

== History ==
Szulok was first mentioned as Zoloc in a decree of Béla III for the Johannites of Székesfehérvár in 1193. In the papal tithe registration between 1332 and 1337 it was written as Zulak. During the Turkish occupation the settlement perished.

In the 18th century it came into the hands of the Széchenyi family. István Széchényi invited German settlers from Württemberg between 1715 and 1757. They worked with charcoal burning, but after the loss of forests they started to plant tobacco. Szulok rapidly achieved a reputation in the whole country for his tobacco.

In 1772 the village already had its Catholic parish and school. The first seal of the village was made in 1788. In 1811 Szulok got market town rights. During the 20th century the town was still well known for its tobacco.

The Germans started to use cattle or horses for ploughing, already before the Croats and Hungarians in Somogy County. According to the registers there were more horses in German villages than in the Hungarian and Croat ones. During the time that they saved with this technique they use to plant more plants especially tobacco which they could sell. The residents of Szulok were among the first who started to drain the swamp to increase the tillable fields. They also used this methode for others for payment. For the money they made with it they invested in buying new plough lands or vineyards. However they produced a lot of vine, they were also those who consumed the less. The money accumulation was among the Germans the most remarkable in Somogy County which caused their economic development in the 19th century.

== Main sights ==
- Roman Catholic Church (built in 1800 and was dedicated to Saint Simon and Judas Tadeo, the patrons of the lumberjacks)
- Holy Trinity Column
- traditional country house
- thermal spa - operates since 1969. Its over 50 °C water is recommended for the treatment of rheum and gynaecological problems.
- epitaph in the cemetery is a work of Mihály Vörösmarty according to some sources who found refuge in the village after the Hungarian Revolution of 1848

„Meg ne háborítsd a csendet, mely e sír körül lebeg. Itt egy édes jó anyának fáradt teste szendereg. Éltében sokat virrasztott, hadd nyugodjék hamva hát. Gyermekei és unokái könnye könnyítse meg porát.”
