= Somogyaracs =

Somogyaracs Orač / Arača (in Croatian)
- Village
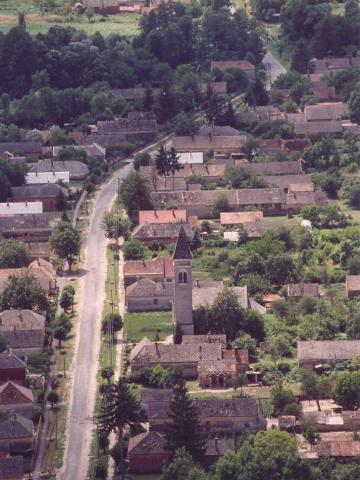
- Aerial view of the village

- Coat of arms

- Location of Somogy county in Hungary

- Location of Somogyaracs
- Coordinates: 46.05673°N 17.39071°E
- Country: Hungary
- Region: Southern Transdanubia
- County: Somogy
- District: Barcs
- RC Diocese: Kaposvár

Area
  - Total: 7.7 km^{2} (3.0 sq mi)

Population (2017)
  - Total: 190
  - Density: 25/km^{2} (64/sq mi)
- Demonym(s): aracsi, somogyaracsi
- Time zone: UTC+1 (CET)
  - Summer (DST): UTC+2 (CEST)
- Postal code: 7584
- Area code: (+36) 82
- NUTS 3 code: HU232
- MP: László Szászfalvi (KDNP)

Somogyaracs (Croatian: Orač / Arača) is a village in Somogy county, Hungary.

== Geography ==
It lies 15 km northwest of Barcs, between Csokonyavisonta and Babócsa. The village is famous for its forests and wildlife.

== History ==
Somogyaracs was first mentioned in 1269 as Arach, later in 1397 as Aracha. It was owned by the Török family of Enying in 1467, then in 1512 it came into the hands of the three sons of Imre Perneszi, Miklós, Pál and István. Its last landlord was the Somssich family. Its first school opened in 1839. According to the 1870 census the village had 424 residents. There was a huge conflagration in 1877 when the half of the houses burnt down. According to the 1910 census out of its 428 inhabitants there were 338 Hungarians, 83 Croats and 7 Germans. By religion there were 425 Roman Catholics and 3 Calvinists.
