= Szentborbás =

Szentborbás Brlobaš (in Croatian)
- Village
- Coat of arms

- Location of Somogy county in Hungary

- Location of Szentborbás
- Coordinates: 45.874919°N 17.660111°E
- Country: Hungary
- Region: Southern Transdanubia
- County: Somogy
- District: Barcs
- RC Diocese: Pécs

Area
  - Total: 7.47 km^{2} (2.88 sq mi)

Population (2017)
  - Total: 97
  - Density: 13/km^{2} (34/sq mi)
- Demonym(s): borbási, szentborbási
- Time zone: UTC+1 (CET)
  - Summer (DST): UTC+2 (CEST)
- Postal code: 7918
- Area code: (+36) 82
- NUTS 3 code: HU232
- MP: László Szászfalvi (KDNP)

Szentborbás (Croatian: Brlobaš) is the southernmost village of Somogy county, Hungary. Krancsevicza-puszta is part of the village.

== Geography ==
It is located near the River Drava, 32 km southeast of Barcs, on the border of Somogy and Baranya County. A significant part of the town's outskirts is part of the Duna-Dráva National Park.

The EuroVelo International Bicycle Route 13, "Iron Curtain" passes through Szentborbás.

== History ==
Szentborbás is a Árpád-era settlement that existed already before the Mongol invasion. In 1324 it was mentioned as Zenthbarrabás and belonged to the Zselicszentjakab Abbey. According to Pope Gregory, the village chapel was built before 1216. It appeared already in the 1332-1337 papal tithe register. In 1375 it was owned by the Dersfi de Szerdahely family. According to the tax register of 1536 it was a possession of Bálint Török. In the tithe register of the Pannonhalma Abbey in 1660 it was the possession of the Custodiatus of the Diocese of Székesfehérvár and partly of the Zselicszentjakab Abbey.

In 1733 it was uninhabited. After 1757 it was reestablished. During the second half of the 18th century Roman Catholic Croats and Šokci settled there. In the 1772 census it was described as a fully Croatian village. Most of its citizens originated from Virovitica County. The Croatian costume still can be seen in the village on festive occasions.

== Main sights ==
- environmental protected flood basin of the River Drava and its surroundings in the Duna-Dráva National Park
