= Péterhida =

Péterhida Petrida / Petrica (in Croatian)
- Village
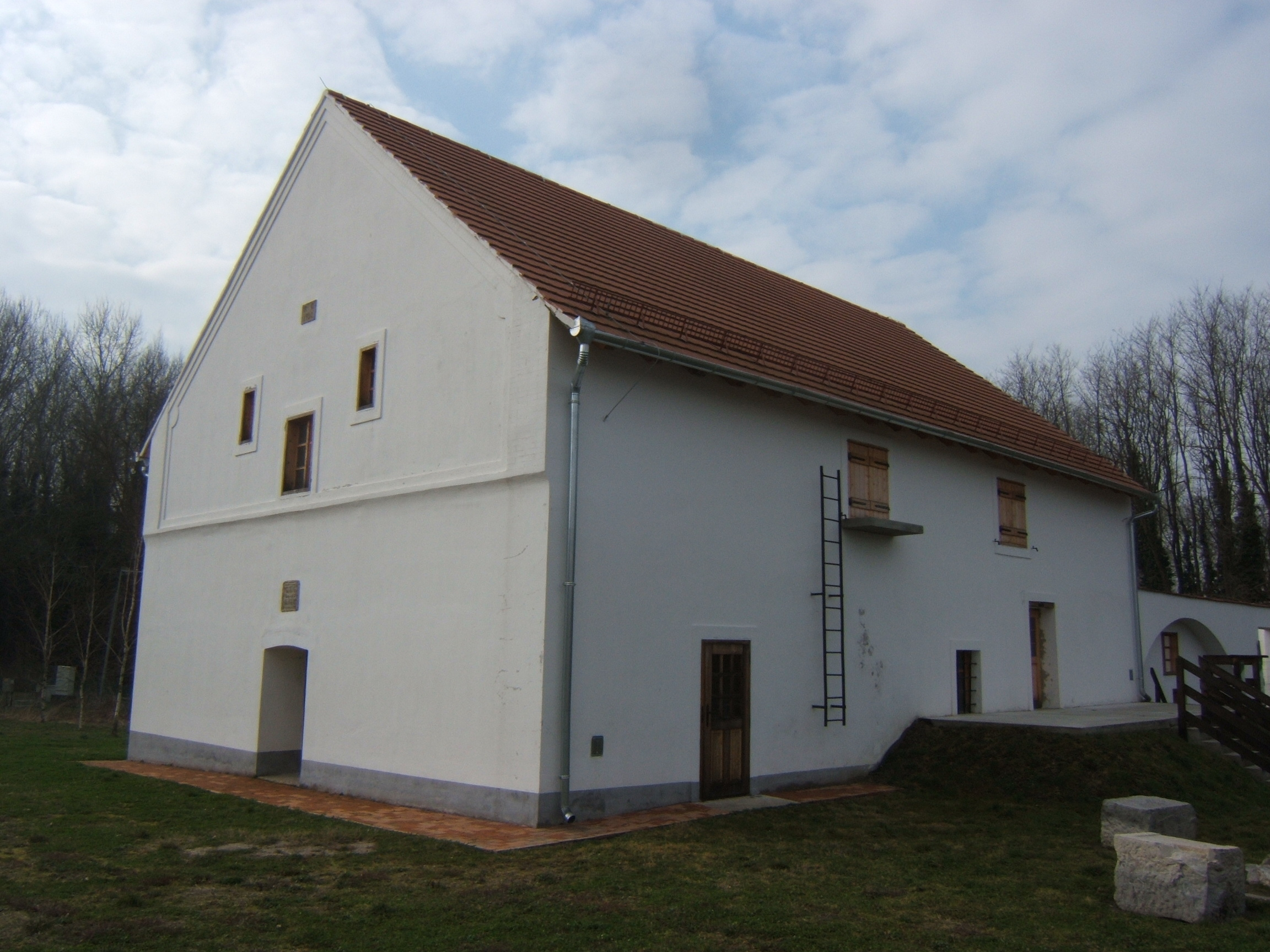
- Watermill in Péterhida

- Coat of arms

- Location of Somogy county in Hungary

- Location of Péterhida
- Coordinates: 46.01053°N 17.36032°E
- Country: Hungary
- Region: Southern Transdanubia
- County: Somogy
- District: Barcs
- RC Diocese: Kaposvár

Area
  - Total: 11.62 km^{2} (4.49 sq mi)

Population (2017)
  - Total: 146
  - Density: 12.6/km^{2} (32.5/sq mi)
- Demonym: péterhidai
- Time zone: UTC+1 (CET)
  - Summer (DST): UTC+2 (CEST)
- Postal code: 7582
- Area code: (+36) 82
- NUTS 3 code: HU232
- MP: László Szászfalvi (KDNP)

Péterhida (Hungarian pronunciation: [ˈpeːtɛrɦidɒ]; Croatian: Petrida / Petrica) is a village in Somogy county, Hungary.

== History ==
According to László Szita the settlement was completely Hungarian in the 18th century.
