= Homokszentgyörgy =

Homokszentgyörgy Senđuđ (in Croatian)
- Village
- Coat of arms

- Location of Somogy county in Hungary

- Location of Homokszentgyörgy
- Coordinates: 46.11777°N 17.57560°E
- Country: Hungary
- Region: Southern Transdanubia
- County: Somogy
- District: Barcs
- RC Diocese: Kaposvár

Area
  - Total: 49.64 km^{2} (19.17 sq mi)

Population (2017)
  - Total: 1,038
  - Density: 20.91/km^{2} (54.16/sq mi)
- Demonym(s): szentgyörgyi, homokszentgyörgyi
- Time zone: UTC+1 (CET)
  - Summer (DST): UTC+2 (CEST)
- Postal code: 7537
- Area code: (+36) 82
- Patron Saint: George of Lydda
- NUTS 3 code: HU232
- MP: László Szászfalvi (KDNP)
- Website: Homokszentgyörgy Online

Homokszentgyörgy (Croatian: Senđuđ) is a village in Somogy county, Hungary.

== History ==
According to László Szita the settlement was completely Hungarian in the 18th century.
