= Kálmáncsa =

Kálmáncsa Kamača (in Croatian)
- Village
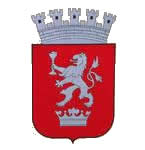
- Coat of arms

- Location of Somogy county in Hungary

- Location of Kálmáncsa
- Coordinates: 46.06759°N 17.61134°E
- Country: Hungary
- Region: Southern Transdanubia
- County: Somogy
- District: Barcs
- RC Diocese: Kaposvár

Area
  - Total: 48.85 km^{2} (18.86 sq mi)

Population (2017)
  - Total: 616
  - Density: 12.6/km^{2} (32.7/sq mi)
- Demonym: kálmánycsai
- Time zone: UTC+1 (CET)
  - Summer (DST): UTC+2 (CEST)
- Postal code: 7538
- Area code: (+36) 82
- NUTS 3 code: HU232
- MP: László Szászfalvi (KDNP)
- Website: Kálmáncsa Online

Kálmáncsa (Croatian: Kamača) is a village in Somogy county, Hungary.

== History ==
According to László Szita the settlement was completely Hungarian in the 18th century.
