= Barcs District =

Barcs District Barcsi járás
- District
- Coat of arms

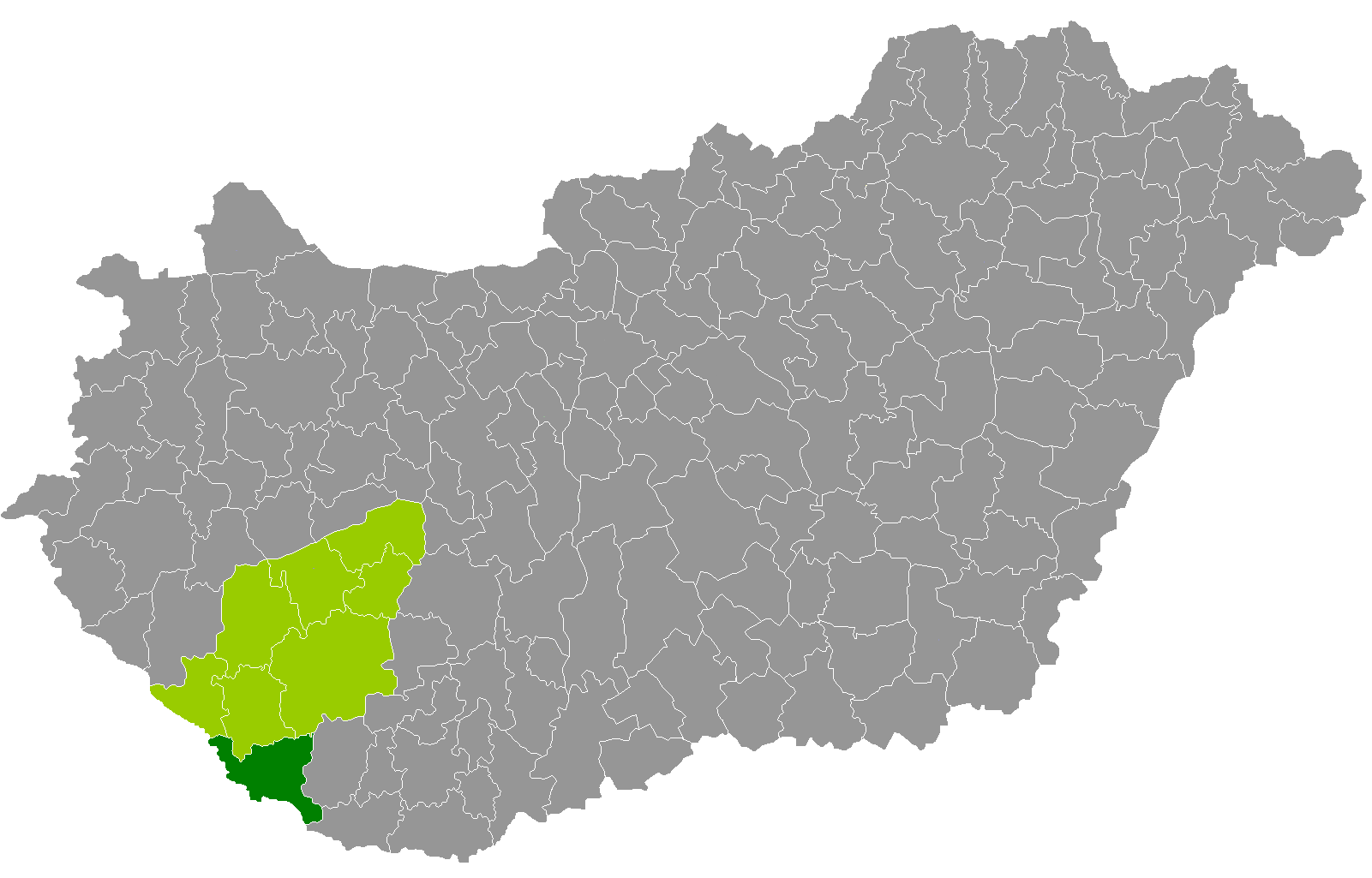
- Barcs District within Hungary and Somogy County.
- Country: Hungary
- Region: Southern Transdanubia
- County: Somogy
- District seat: Barcs

Area
  - Total: 696.47 km^{2} (268.91 sq mi)
  - Rank: 3rd in Somogy

Population (2011 census)
  - Total: 23,793
  - Rank: 6th in Somogy
  - Density: 34/km^{2} (88/sq mi)

Barcs (Hungarian: Barcsi járás) is a district in southern part of Somogy County. Barcs is also the name of the town where the district seat is located. The district is in the Southern Transdanubia Statistical Region.

== Geography ==
Barcs District borders with Csurgó District, Nagyatád District and Kaposvár District to the north, Szigetvár District and Sellye District (Baranya County) to the east, the Croatian counties of Virovitica-Podravina and Koprivnica-Križevci to the southwest. The number of the inhabited places in Barcs District is 26.

== Municipalities ==
The district has 1 town and 25 villages. (ordered by population, as of 1 January 2013)

- **Barcs** (11,173) – district seat
- Babócsa (1,597)
- Bélavár (367)
- Bolhó (762)
- Csokonyavisonta (1,575)
- Darány (950)
- Drávagárdony (146)
- Drávatamási (401)
- Heresznye (247)
- Homokszentgyörgy (1,154)
- Istvándi (613)
- Kastélyosdombó (221)
- Kálmáncsa (654)
- Komlósd (168)
- Lad (558)
- Lakócsa (550)
- Patosfa (240)
- Péterhida (162)
- Potony (208)
- Rinyaújlak (271)
- Rinyaújnép (54)
- Somogyaracs (198)
- Szentborbás (116)
- Szulok (690)
- Tótújfalu (201)
- Vízvár (541)

The bolded municipality is city.

== See also ==
- List of cities and towns in Hungary
