= Komlósd =

Komlósd Komluš / Komloš (in Croatian)
- Village
- Coat of arms

- Location of Somogy county in Hungary

- Location of Komlósd
- Coordinates: 46.01801°N 17.38611°E
- Country: Hungary
- Region: Southern Transdanubia
- County: Somogy
- District: Barcs
- RC Diocese: Kaposvár

Area
  - Total: 7.46 km^{2} (2.88 sq mi)

Population (2017)
  - Total: 150
  - Density: 20/km^{2} (52/sq mi)
- Demonym: komlósdi
- Time zone: UTC+1 (CET)
  - Summer (DST): UTC+2 (CEST)
- Postal code: 7582
- Area code: (+36) 82
- NUTS 3 code: HU232
- MP: László Szászfalvi (KDNP)

Komlósd (Croatian: Komluš / Komloš) is a village in Somogy county, Hungary.
