= Rinyaújlak =

Rinyaújlak Vilak (in Croatian)
- Village
- Coat of arms

- Location of Somogy county in Hungary

- Location of Rinyaújlak
- Coordinates: 46.08425°N 17.42587°E
- Country: Hungary
- Region: Southern Transdanubia
- County: Somogy
- District: Barcs
- RC Diocese: Kaposvár

Area
  - Total: 24.26 km^{2} (9.37 sq mi)

Population (2017)
  - Total: 256
  - Density: 10.6/km^{2} (27.3/sq mi)
- Demonym(s): újlaki, rinyaújlaki
- Time zone: UTC+1 (CET)
  - Summer (DST): UTC+2 (CEST)
- Postal code: 7556
- Area code: (+36) 82
- NUTS 3 code: HU232
- MP: László Szászfalvi (KDNP)
- Website: Rinyaújlak Online

Rinyaújlak (Croatian: Vilak) is a village in Somogy county, Hungary. Originally inhabited by people of the district of the Queen of Segesd, in 1401 the village was named Laak, being known later in the 15th century as Wylaak.

== History ==
According to László Szita the settlement was completely Hungarian in the 18th century.
