= Bélavár =

Bélavár Belovar (in Croatian)
- Village
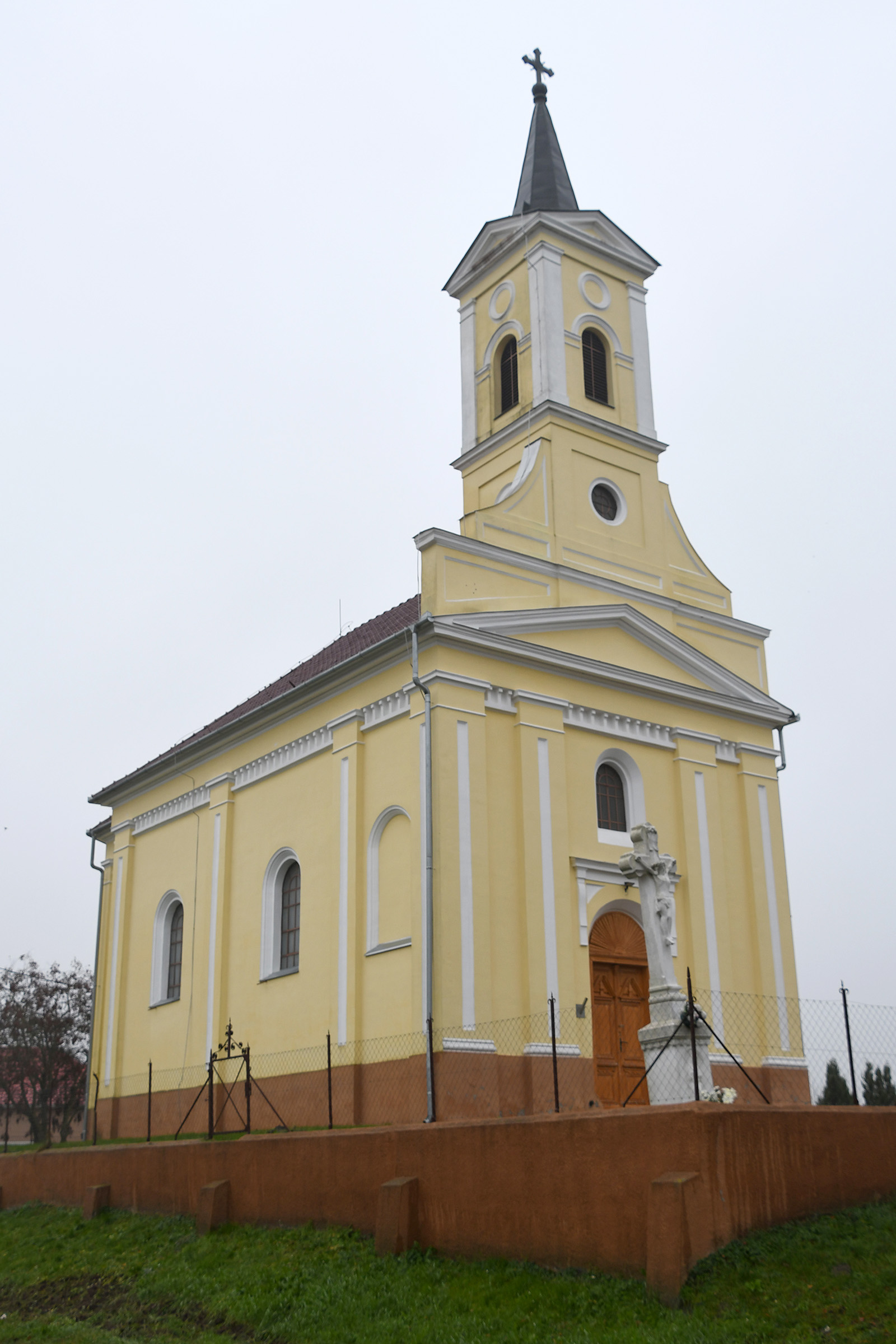
- Bélavár Catholic Church

- Coat of arms

- Location of Somogy county in Hungary

- Location of Bélavár
- Coordinates: 46.12191°N 17.21942°E
- Country: Hungary
- Region: Southern Transdanubia
- County: Somogy
- District: Barcs
- RC Diocese: Kaposvár

Area
  - Total: 22.78 km^{2} (8.80 sq mi)

Population (2017)
  - Total: 317
  - Density: 13.9/km^{2} (36.0/sq mi)
- Demonym: bélavári
- Time zone: UTC+1 (CET)
  - Summer (DST): UTC+2 (CEST)
- Postal code: 7589
- Area code: (+36) 82
- NUTS 3 code: HU232
- MP: László Szászfalvi (KDNP)
- Website: Bélavár Online

Bélavár (Croatian: Belovar) is a village in Somogy county, Hungary.

== Etymology ==
Its name consists of two worlds. Béla is a Hungarian person name. Bélavár (English: Béla Castle) could be the name of a castle of a person called Béla near the settlement.
