= Visnye =

Visnye Višnja (in Croatian)
- Village
- Coat of arms

- Location of Somogy county in Hungary

- Location of Visnye
- Coordinates: 46.19138°N 17.67716°E
- Country: Hungary
- Region: Southern Transdanubia
- County: Somogy
- District: Kaposvár
- RC Diocese: Kaposvár

Area
  - Total: 24.38 km^{2} (9.41 sq mi)

Population (2017)
  - Total: 238
  - Density: 9.76/km^{2} (25.3/sq mi)
- Demonym: visnyei
- Time zone: UTC+1 (CET)
  - Summer (DST): UTC+2 (CEST)
- Postal code: 7533
- Area code: (+36) 82
- NUTS 3 code: HU232
- MP: László Szászfalvi (KDNP)
- Website: Visnye Online

Visnye (Croatian: Višnja) is a village in Somogy county, Hungary.
