= Lad, Hungary =

Lad Lott (in German)
- Village
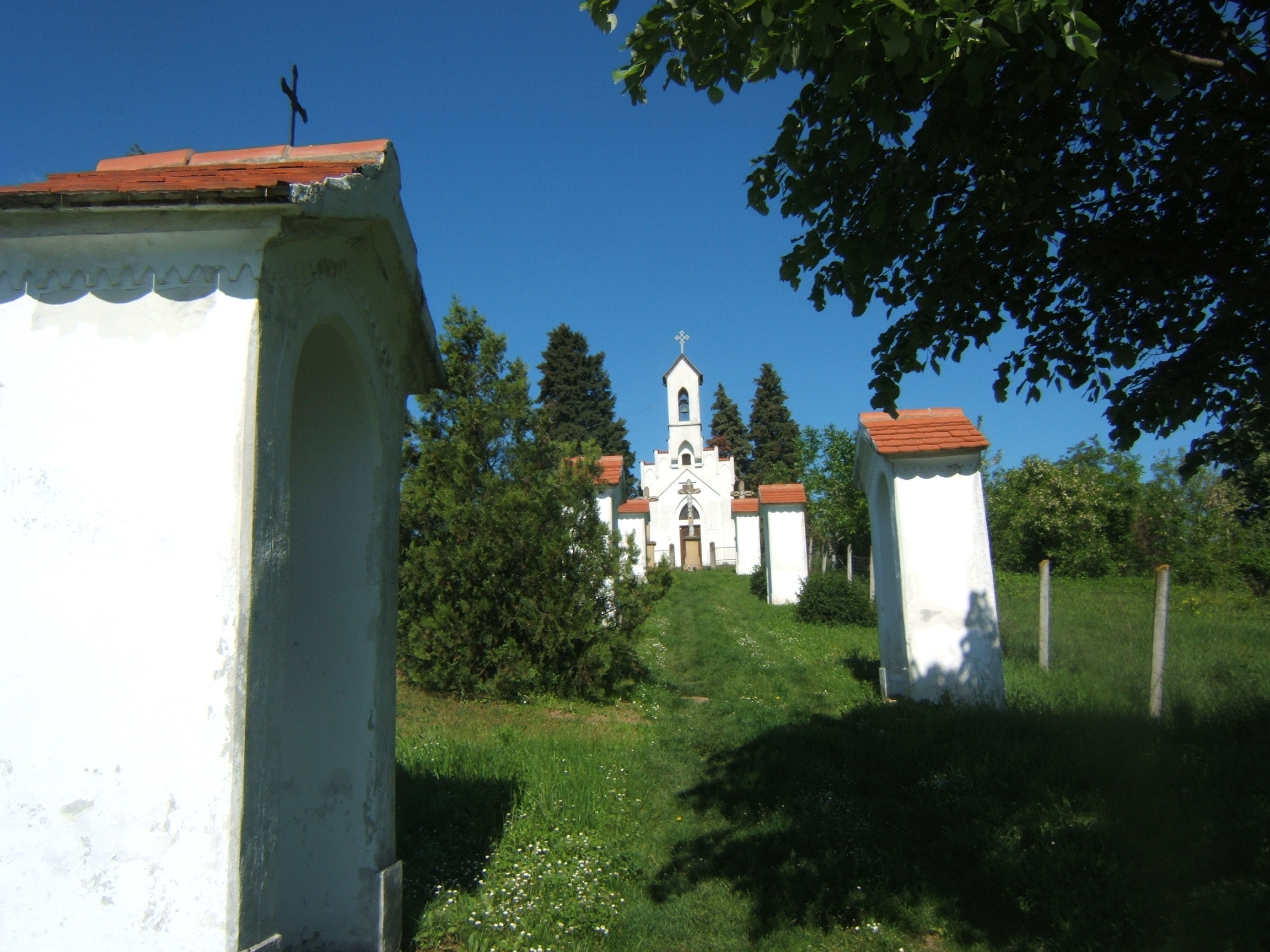
- Calvary in Lad

- Location of Somogy county in Hungary

- Location of Lad, Hungary
- Coordinates: 46.14577°N 17.64599°E
- Country: Hungary
- Region: Southern Transdanubia
- County: Somogy
- District: Barcs
- RC Diocese: Kaposvár

Area
  - Total: 22.35 km^{2} (8.63 sq mi)

Population (2017)
  - Total: 561
  - Density: 25.1/km^{2} (65.0/sq mi)
- Demonym: ladi
- Time zone: UTC+1 (CET)
  - Summer (DST): UTC+2 (CEST)
- Postal code: 7535
- Area code: (+36) 82
- NUTS 3 code: HU232
- MP: László Szászfalvi (KDNP)
- Website: Lad Online

Lad (German: Lott) is a village in Somogy county, Hungary.

== Gallery ==
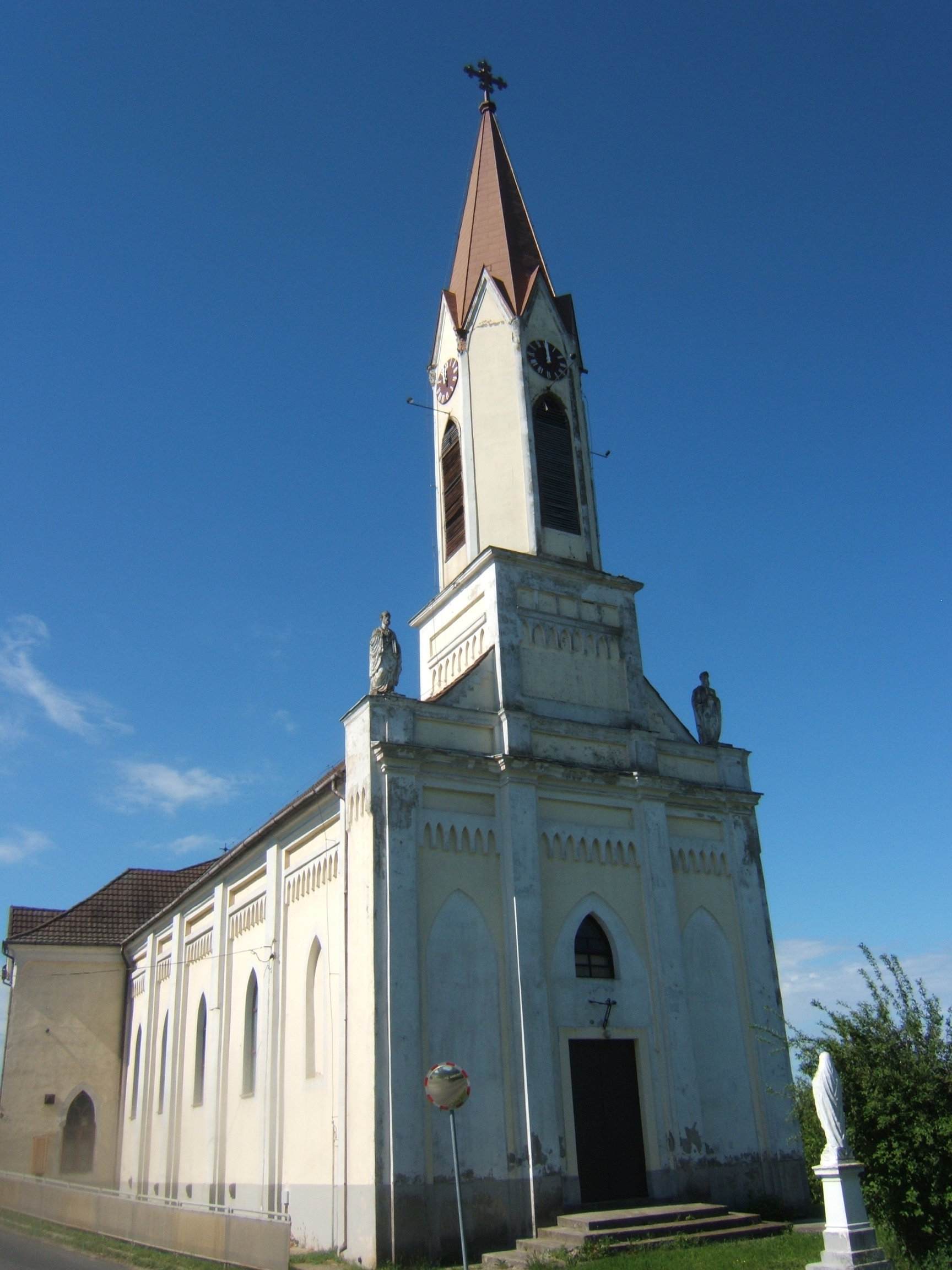
Roman Catholic Church in Lad

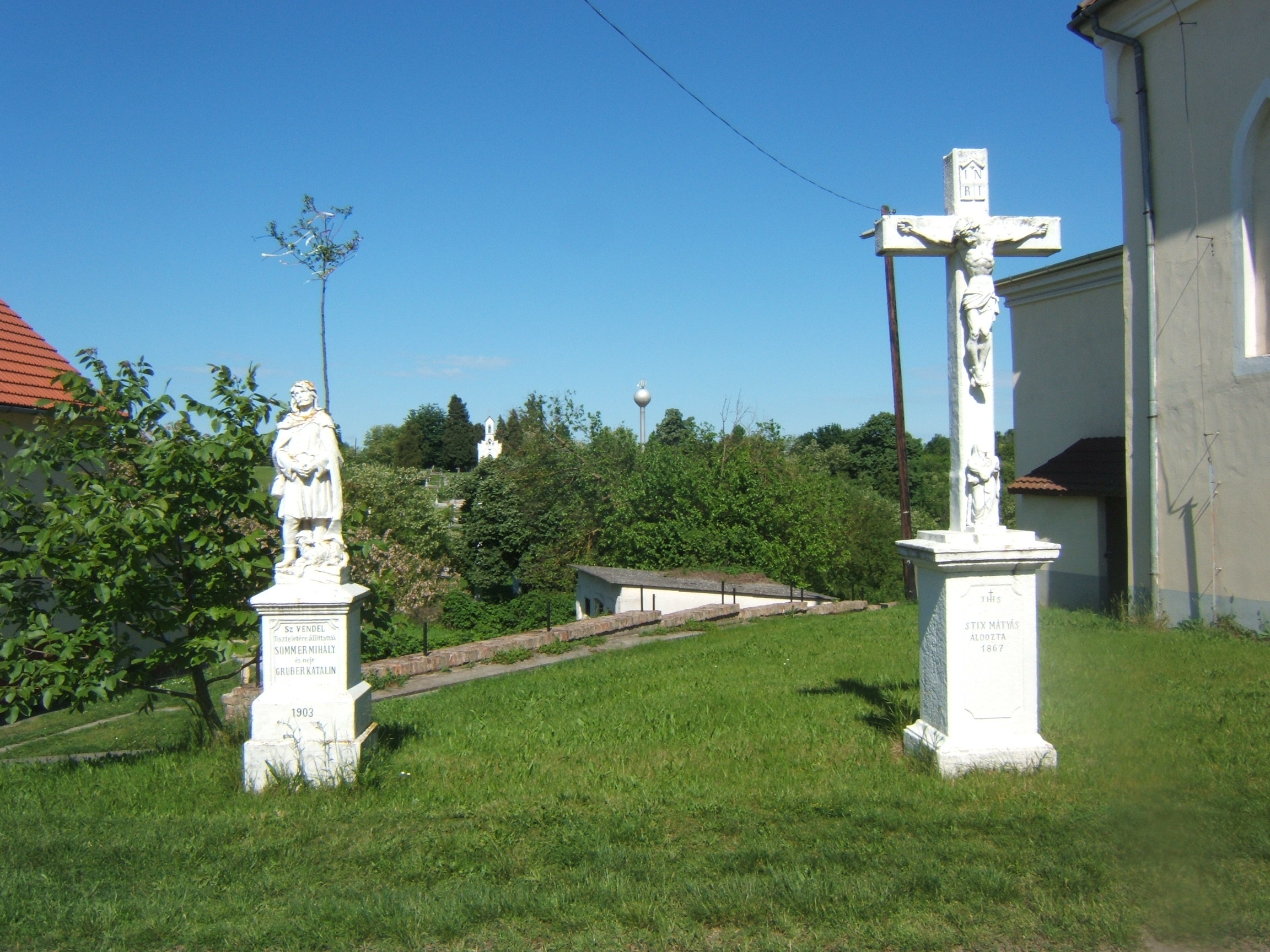
Statue of Saint Wendelin (1903) and stonecross (1867)
