= Istvándi =

Istvándi Išvandin (in Croatian)
- Village
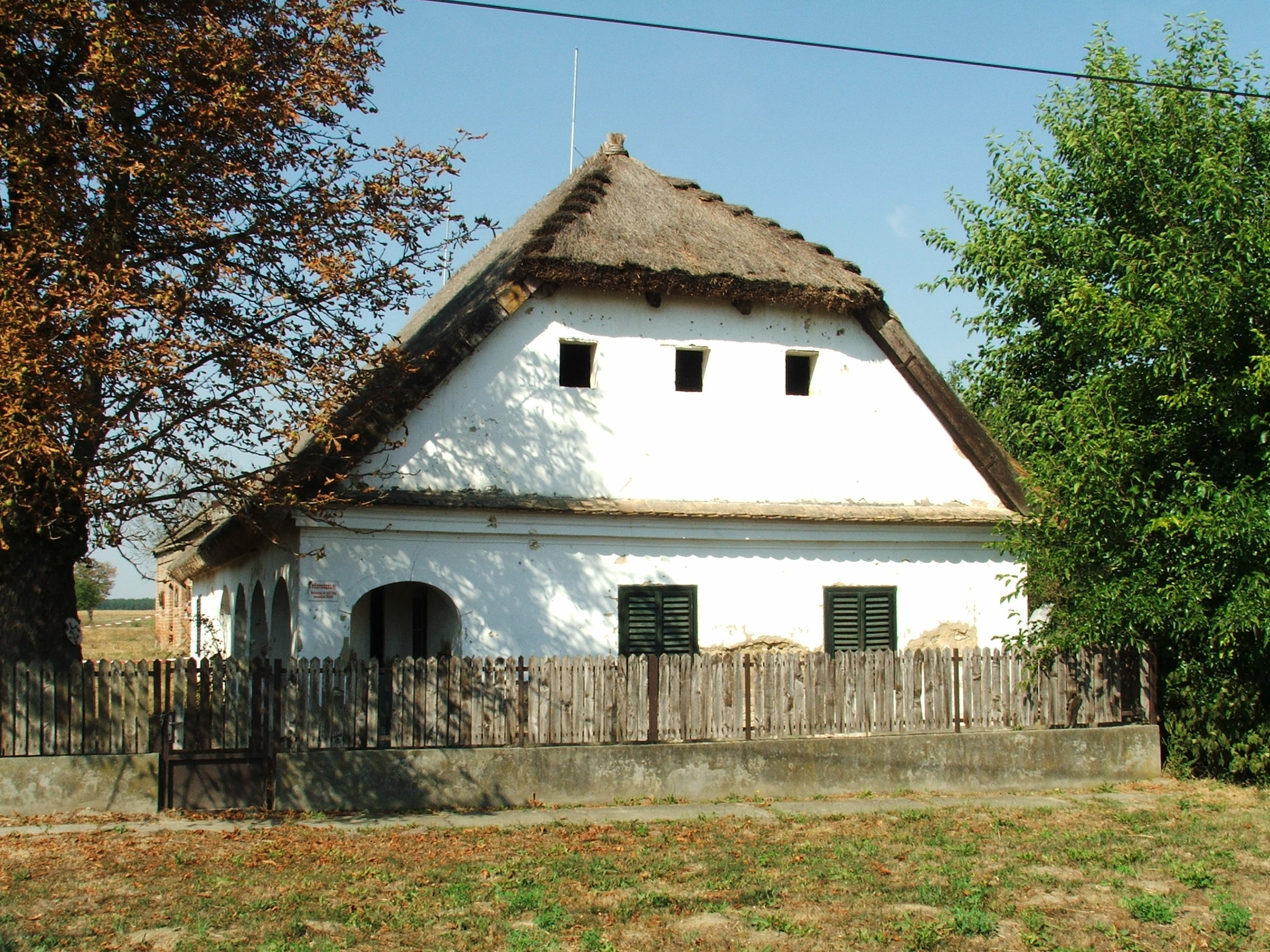
- Traditional house in Istvándi

- Coat of arms

- Location of Somogy county in Hungary

- Location of Istvándi
- Coordinates: 46.02041°N 17.62116°E
- Country: Hungary
- Region: Southern Transdanubia
- County: Somogy
- District: Barcs
- RC Diocese: Kaposvár

Area
  - Total: 30.31 km^{2} (11.70 sq mi)

Population (2017)
  - Total: 549
  - Density: 18.1/km^{2} (46.9/sq mi)
- Demonym: istvándi
- Time zone: UTC+1 (CET)
  - Summer (DST): UTC+2 (CEST)
- Postal code: 7987
- Area code: (+36) 82
- NUTS 3 code: HU232
- MP: László Szászfalvi (KDNP)
- Website: Istvándi Online

Istvándi (Croatian: Išvandin) is a village in Somogy county, Hungary.

== History ==
According to László Szita the settlement was completely Hungarian in the 18th century.

== Notable people ==
- Lajos Magyar
