= Patosfa =

- Village
- Flag Coat of arms

- Location of Somogy county in Hungary

- Location of Patosfa
- Coordinates: 46.12933°N 17.66360°E
- Country: Hungary
- Region: Southern Transdanubia
- County: Somogy
- District: Barcs
- RC Diocese: Kaposvár

Area
  - Total: 15.07 km^{2} (5.82 sq mi)

Population (2017)
  - Total: 239
  - Density: 15.9/km^{2} (41.1/sq mi)
- Demonym: patosfai
- Time zone: UTC+1 (CET)
  - Summer (DST): UTC+2 (CEST)
- Postal code: 7536
- Area code: (+36) 82
- NUTS 3 code: HU232
- MP: László Szászfalvi (KDNP)
- Website: Patosfa Online

Patosfa is a village in Somogy county, Hungary.

== Etymology ==
According to the local legends the name was Padosfa (English: tree with a bank). The scientific explanation states that it derives from the person name Potus or Patus. The village was known as Patusfalva (English: village of Patus) in the Middle Ages.
