= Rinyaújnép =

Rinyaújnép Vunep (in Croatian)
- Village
- Coat of arms

- Location of Somogy county in Hungary

- Location of Rinyaújnép
- Coordinates: 46.08182°N 17.35508°E
- Country: Hungary
- Region: Southern Transdanubia
- County: Somogy
- District: Barcs
- RC Diocese: Kaposvár

Area
  - Total: 8.28 km^{2} (3.20 sq mi)

Population (2017)
  - Total: 55
  - Density: 6.6/km^{2} (17/sq mi)
- Demonym(s): újnépi, rinyaújnépi
- Time zone: UTC+1 (CET)
  - Summer (DST): UTC+2 (CEST)
- Postal code: 7584
- Area code: (+36) 82
- NUTS 3 code: HU232
- MP: László Szászfalvi (KDNP)

Rinyaújnép (Croatian: Vunep) is a village in Somogy county, Hungary.
