= Darány =

- Village
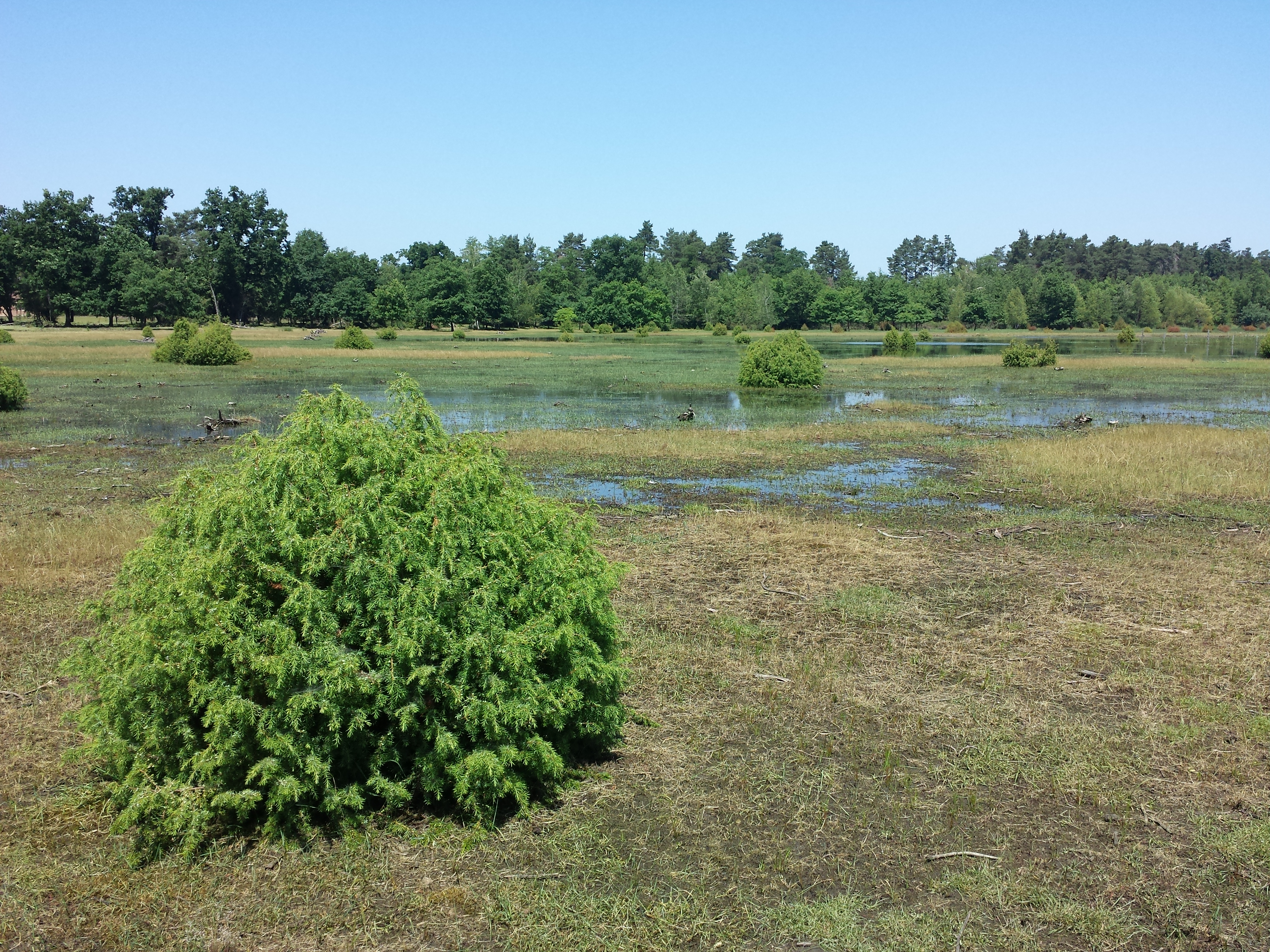
- Wetlands near Darány

- Coat of arms

- Location of Somogy county in Hungary

- Location of Darány
- Coordinates: 45.98069°N 17.59055°E
- Country: Hungary
- Region: Southern Transdanubia
- County: Somogy
- District: Barcs
- RC Diocese: Kaposvár

Area
  - Total: 28.1 km^{2} (10.8 sq mi)

Population (2023)
  - Total: 797
  - Density: 28.4/km^{2} (73.5/sq mi)
- Demonym: darányi
- Time zone: UTC+1 (CET)
  - Summer (DST): UTC+2 (CEST)
- Postal code: 7988
- Area code: (+36) 82
- NUTS 3 code: HU232
- MP: László Szászfalvi (KDNP)
- Website: Darány Online

Darány is a village in Somogy county, Hungary.

== History ==
According to László Szita, the settlement was completely Hungarian in the 18th century.

== Demographics ==
As of 2022, the town was 89.1% Hungarian, 3.4% Gypsy, 3.2% Croatian, and 1.9% of non-European origin. The population was 45.8% Roman Catholic, and 20.6% Reformed, and 9.5% nondenominational.
