= Bolhó =

Bolhó Bojevo / Boljevo (in Croatian)
- Village
- Coat of arms

- Location of Bolhó
- Coordinates: 46.03904°N 17.30376°E
- Country: Hungary
- Region: Southern Transdanubia
- County: Somogy
- District: Barcs
- RC Diocese: Kaposvár

Area
  - Total: 25.07 km^{2} (9.68 sq mi)

Population (2017)
  - Total: 745
  - Density: 29.7/km^{2} (77.0/sq mi)
- Demonym: bolhói
- Time zone: UTC+1 (CET)
  - Summer (DST): UTC+2 (CEST)
- Postal code: 7586
- Area code: (+36) 82
- NUTS 3 code: HU232
- MP: László Szászfalvi (KDNP)
- Website: Bolhó Online

Bolhó (Croatian: Bojevo / Boljevo) is a village in Somogy county, Hungary.

== Notable residents ==
- Pál Losonczi (1919 - 2005), Hungarian politician, President of the Presidential Council of the Hungarian People's Republic
- Vendel Bicsár (born 1947), Hungarian goldsmith and glass artist
