= Kastélyosdombó =

Kastélyosdombó Dombol / Dombov (in Croatian)
- Village
- Coat of arms

- Location of Somogy county in Hungary

- Location of Kastélyosdombó
- Coordinates: 45.95381°N 17.62090°E
- Country: Hungary
- Region: Southern Transdanubia
- County: Somogy
- District: Barcs
- RC Diocese: Kaposvár

Area
  - Total: 13.08 km^{2} (5.05 sq mi)

Population (2017)
  - Total: 271
  - Density: 20.7/km^{2} (53.7/sq mi)
- Demonym(s): dombói, kastélyosdombói
- Time zone: UTC+1 (CET)
  - Summer (DST): UTC+2 (CEST)
- Postal code: 7977
- Area code: (+36) 82
- NUTS 3 code: HU232
- MP: László Szászfalvi (KDNP)
- Website: Kastélyosdombó Online

Kastélyosdombó (Croatian: Dombol / Dombov) is a village in Somogy county, Hungary.
