= Ottó Karvalics =

Hungarian politician

Member of the National Assembly
- In office 15 February 2010 – 5 May 2014

Personal details
- Born: 1947 (age 78–79) Pécs, Hungary
- Party: KDNP
- Spouse: Katalin Harmat
- Children: Ottó; Helga
- Profession: politician

Ottó Karvalics (born 1947) is a Hungarian politician, who was elected the mayor of Barcs in 2010. He was a member of the National Assembly (MP) for Nagyatád (Somogy County Constituency VI) between 2010 and 2014.

Karvalics became MP from the Somogy County Regional List of the Christian Democratic People's Party (KDNP) for three days at the end of the parliamentary term on 15 February 2010, replacing László Kuzma, who died in January.

== Personal life ==
He is married to Katalin Harmat. They have two children - a daughter, Helga and a son, Ottó.
