= Drávatamási =

Drávatamási Tomašin (in Croatian)
- Village
- Coat of arms

- Location of Somogy county in Hungary

- Location of Drávatamási
- Coordinates: 45.94293°N 17.56944°E
- Country: Hungary
- Region: Southern Transdanubia
- County: Somogy
- District: Barcs
- RC Diocese: Kaposvár

Area
  - Total: 8.45 km^{2} (3.26 sq mi)

Population (2017)
  - Total: 381 ▲
  - Density: 45.1/km^{2} (117/sq mi)
- Demonym(s): tamási, drávatamási
- Time zone: UTC+1 (CET)
  - Summer (DST): UTC+2 (CEST)
- Postal code: 7979
- Area code: (33) 85
- NUTS 3 code: HU232
- MP: László Szászfalvi (KDNP)
- Website: Drávatamási Online

Drávatamási (Croatian: Tomašin) is a village in Somogy county, Hungary.
