= Segesd =

Segesd Šegeš (in Croatian)
- Village
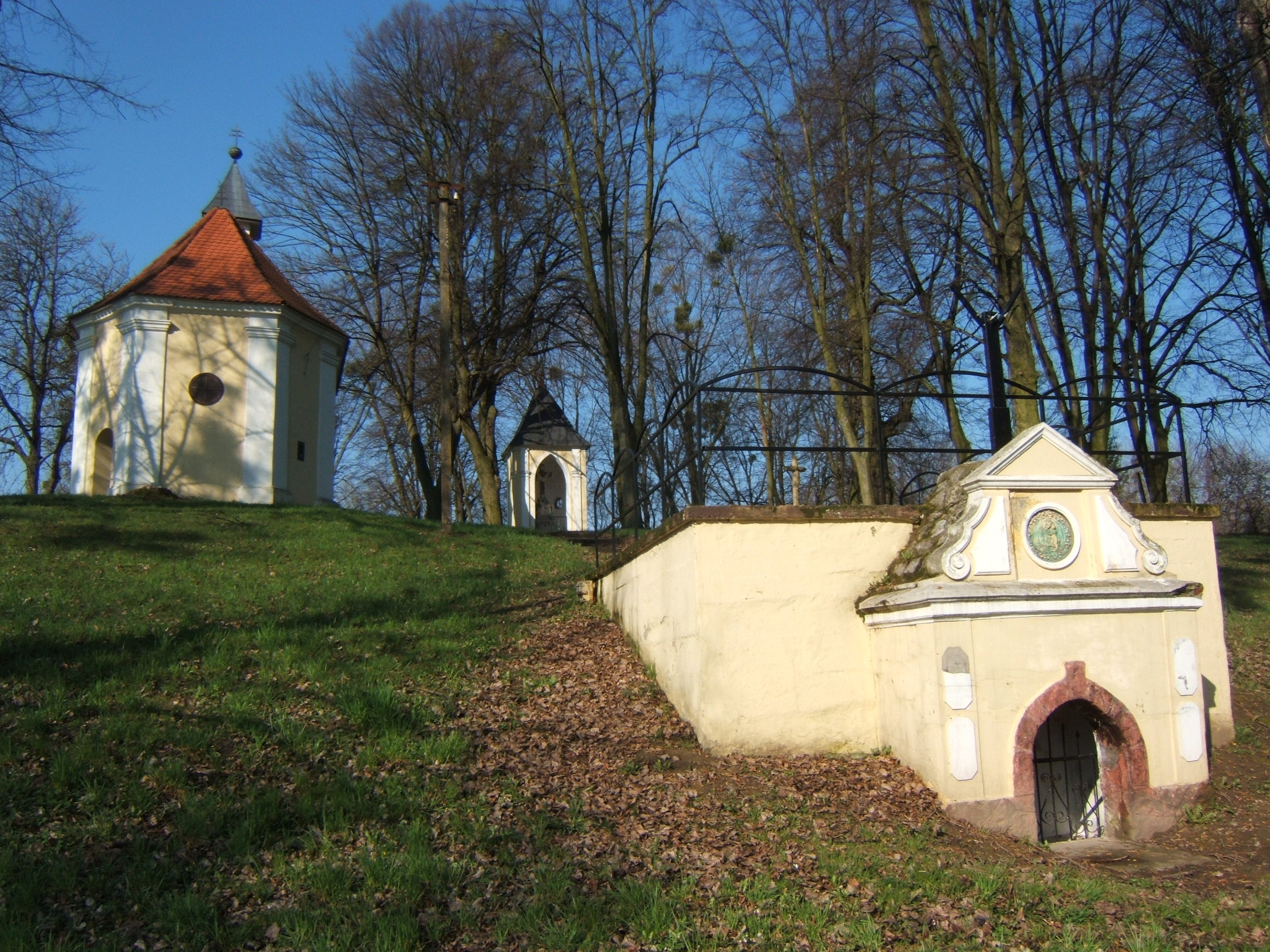
- Holy well and chapel in Segesd

- Coat of arms

- Location of Somogy county in Hungary

- Location of Segesd
- Coordinates: 46.34340°N 17.34754°E
- Country: Hungary
- Region: Southern Transdanubia
- County: Somogy
- District: Nagyatád
- RC Diocese: Kaposvár

Area
  - Total: 73.09 km^{2} (28.22 sq mi)

Population (2017)
  - Total: 2,426
  - Density: 33.19/km^{2} (85.97/sq mi)
- Demonym: segesdi
- Time zone: UTC+1 (CET)
  - Summer (DST): UTC+2 (CEST)
- Postal code: 7562
- Area code: (+36) 82
- NUTS 3 code: HU232
- MP: László Szászfalvi (KDNP)
- Website: Segesd Online

Segesd (Croatian: Šegeš) is a village in Somogy county, Hungary.

== Culture ==
The Hungarian folk song Már megjöttünk estére was collected in 1933 in Segesd by Vilmos Seemayer.
