= Drávagárdony =

Drávagárdony Gardonja (in Croatian)
- Village
- Coat of arms

- Location of Somogy county in Hungary

- Location of Drávagárdony
- Coordinates: 45.94574°N 17.60383°E
- Country: Hungary
- Region: Southern Transdanubia
- County: Somogy
- District: Barcs
- RC Diocese: Kaposvár

Area
  - Total: 6.27 km^{2} (2.42 sq mi)

Population (2017)
  - Total: 174 ▲
  - Density: 27.8/km^{2} (71.9/sq mi)
- Demonym(s): gárdonyi, drávagárdonyi
- Time zone: UTC+1 (CET)
  - Summer (DST): UTC+2 (CEST)
- Postal code: 7977
- Area code: (+36) 82
- NUTS 3 code: HU232
- MP: László Szászfalvi (KDNP)
- Website: Drávagárdony Online

Drávagárdony (Croatian: Gardonja) is a village in Somogy county, Hungary.
