= Döbröce =

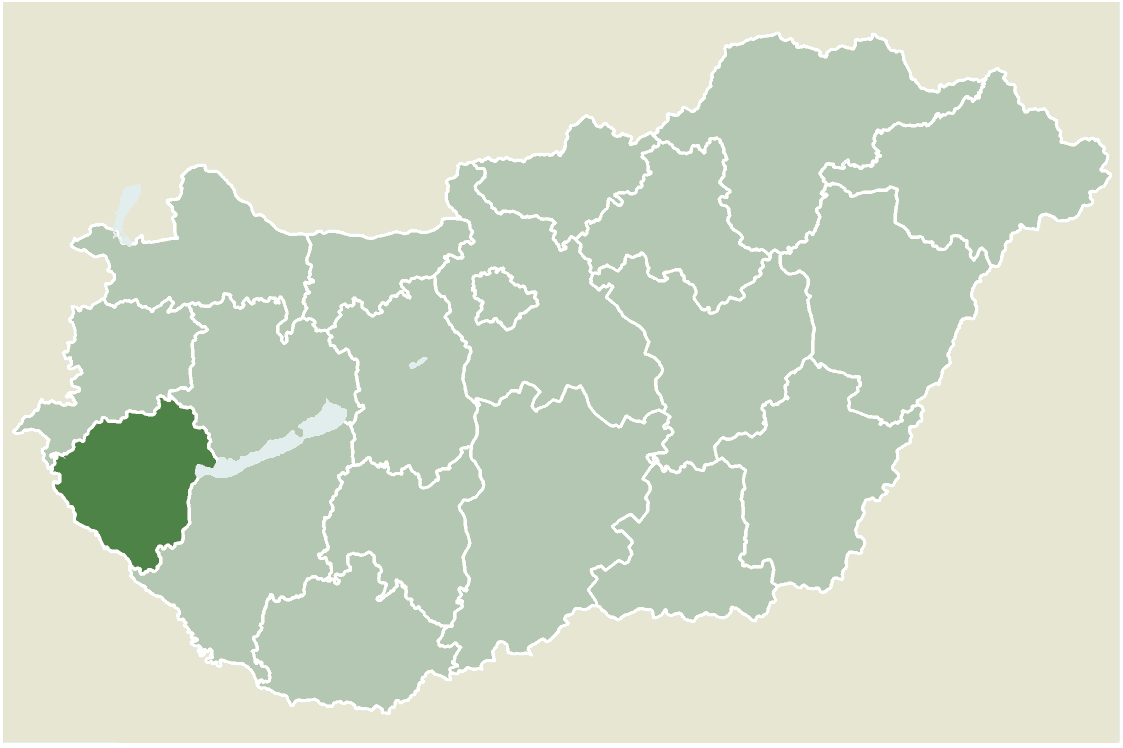
- Location of Zala county in Hungary

- Location of Döbröce
- Coordinates: 46.93653°N 17.18982°E
- Country: Hungary
- County: Zala

Area
  - Total: 2.71 km^{2} (1.05 sq mi)

Population (2004)
  - Total: 92
  - Density: 33.94/km^{2} (87.9/sq mi)
- Time zone: UTC+1 (CET)
  - Summer (DST): UTC+2 (CEST)
- Postal code: 8357
- Area code: 83

Döbröce is a village in Zala County, Hungary.
