= Csokonyavisonta =

- Village
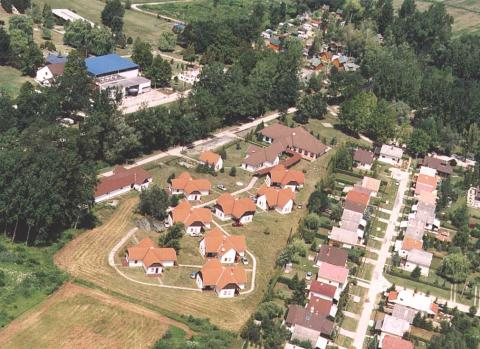
- Aerial view of the village

- Coat of arms

- Location of Somogy county in Hungary

- Location of Csokonyavisonta
- Coordinates: 46.08099°N 17.44607°E
- Country: Hungary
- Region: Southern Transdanubia
- County: Somogy
- District: Barcs
- RC Diocese: Kaposvár

Area
  - Total: 81.29 km^{2} (31.39 sq mi)

Population (2017)
  - Total: 1,546
  - Density: 19.02/km^{2} (49.26/sq mi)
- Demonym(s): visontai, csokonyavisontai
- Time zone: UTC+1 (CET)
  - Summer (DST): UTC+2 (CEST)
- Postal code: 7555
- Area code: (+36) 82
- NUTS 3 code: HU232
- MP: László Szászfalvi (KDNP)
- Website: Csokonyavisonta Online

Csokonyavisonta is a village in Somogy county, Hungary.

== History ==
According to László Szita the settlement was completely Hungarian in the 18th century.
