= József Benke =

Hungarian historian (1937–2026)

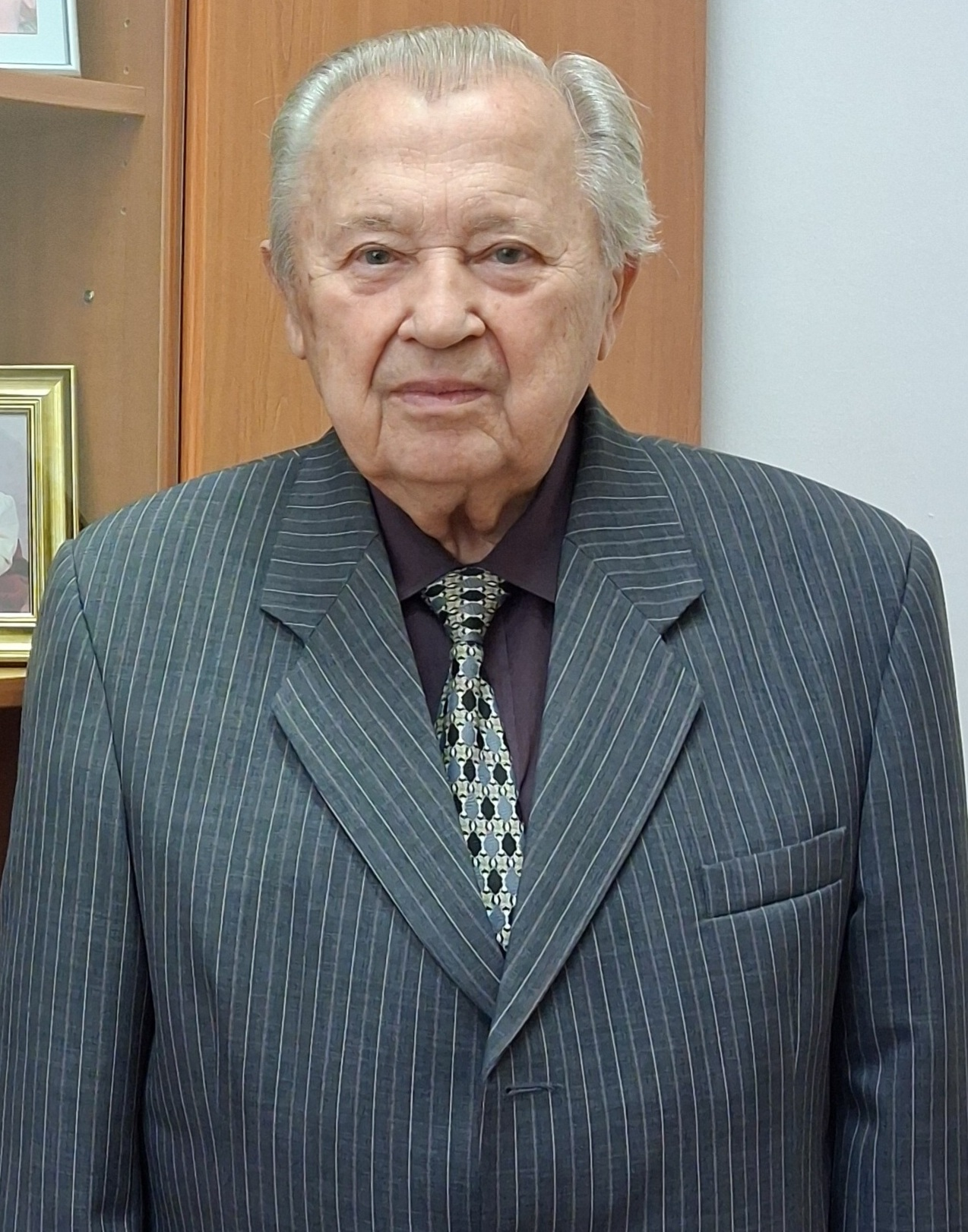
Benke in 2025

József Benke (18 September 1937 – 14 March 2026) was a Hungarian historian.

== Life and career ==
Benke was born in Újvárfalva on 18 September 1937. He obtained his degree in history in 1973. He obtained a postuniversitaire diploma in Nice, which entitled him to work in the European Union, in 1969–1970. In 1971, he spent three months in Damascus, then in 1973 in Brussels.

He was an assistant professor at the Department of Marxism-Leninism of the University of Pécs (1961–1963), and an associate professor (1973–1989). The Medical Faculty Museum of the University History Collection, that he created was opened at the university on 17 September 1992. In 2000, he established the University History Museum of the University of Pécs in the Vasváry house at 19 Király Street.

Initially, he focused on agricultural history. He examined the formation and development of socialist agrarian relations. Later, his interest turned to the relations between nationalities in the Middle East. His Arab related activities were also internationally significant, examining the formation and development of Arab and Jewish national consciousness, and processing the history of Arab countries. About 60 of his larger studies were published in Hungarian and foreign languages in national, academic and foreign journals.

Benke died on 14 March 2026, at the age of 88.

== Awards ==
- Hungarian Cross of Merit (2010)
