= Drávafok =

- Village
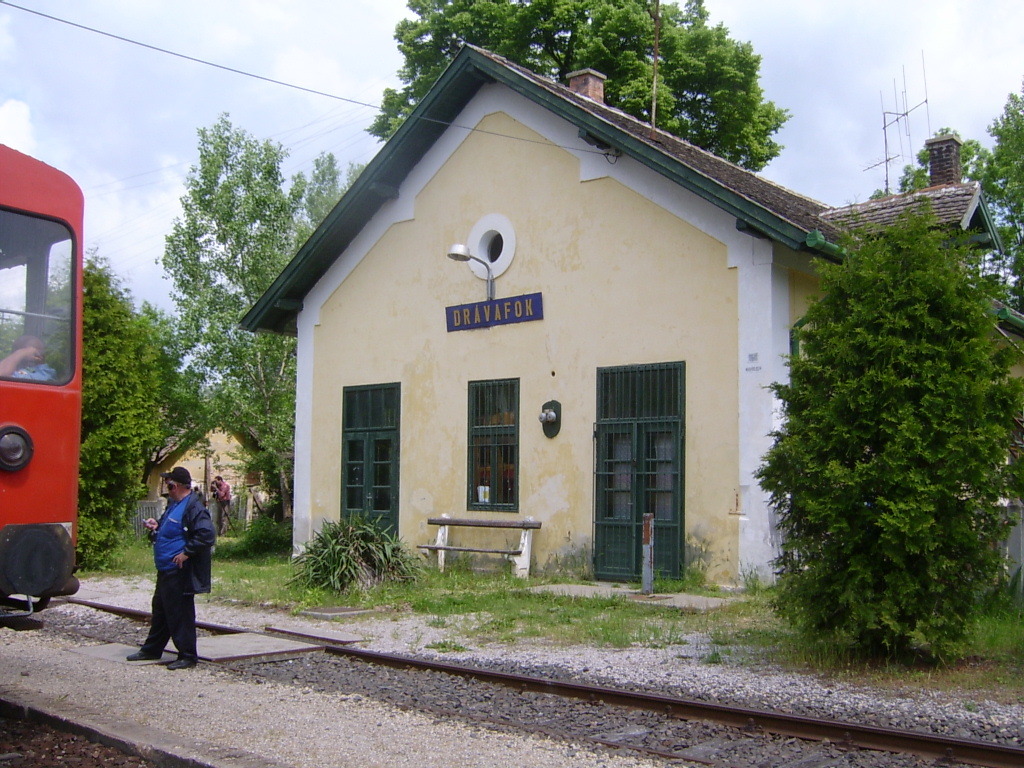
- Drávafok railway station
- Interactive map of Drávafok
- Coordinates: 45°53′N 17°46′E
- Country: Hungary
- County: Baranya
- Time zone: UTC+1 (CET)
  - Summer (DST): UTC+2 (CEST)

Drávafok is a village in Baranya county, Hungary.
