= Danube-Drava National Park =

National park of Hungary

Coordinates: 46.25°N 18.8833°E

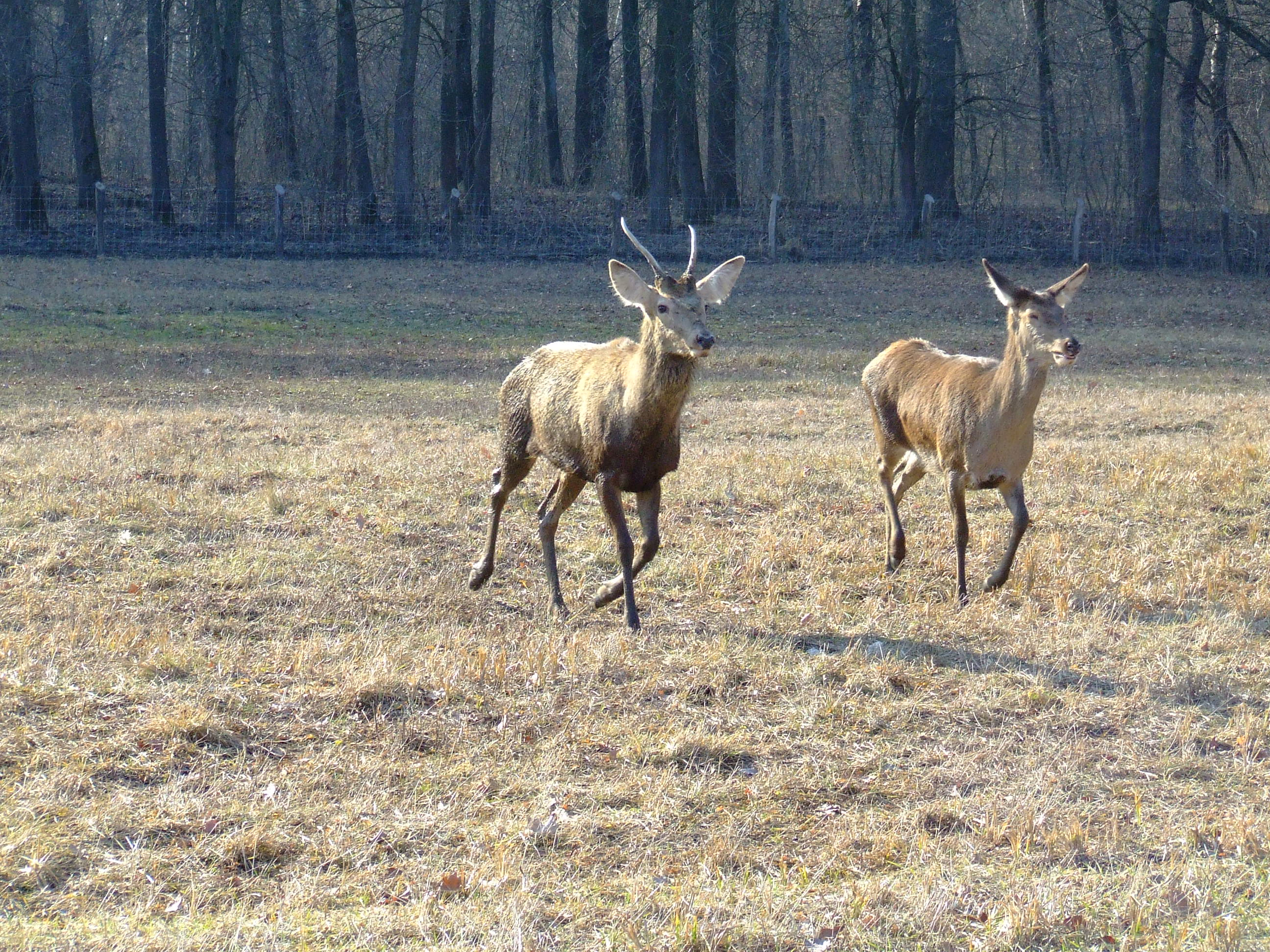
Deer in the national park

Danube-Drava National Park was founded in 1996 and is located in the south west of Hungary. The current area is 490 square kilometres and the majority of the national park sites are located within the Danube and Drava floodland areas, of which 190 km^{2} are Ramsar wetlands. Black stork and White-tailed eagle populations are of European significance. Seven invertebrate species are found only here in Hungary. Habitats along the Drava host more than 400 protected plants and animals. Species endemic to national park areas include the black hawthorn and the Drava caddis fly.

On 15 September 2021, Danube-Drava National Park was designated as one of the core protected areas of the Transboundary UNESCO Biosphere Reserve "Mura-Drava-Danube" – often called the "Amazon of Europe" – which links five countries along over 700 km of the Mura, Drava and Danube rivers. Within the park, a dynamic mosaic of marshes, oxbow lakes, channels and riparian woodlands absorbs seasonal floods and maintains water quality downstream.

This network of wetlands supports a rich diversity of life, with extensive populations of fish, reptiles, aquatic invertebrates and marsh birds, alongside a variety of mammals adapted to wetland conditions. Large vertebrates include the Eurasian beaver (Castor fiber) and Eurasian otter (Lutra lutra), while the Danube channels within the park support two endangered sturgeon species—ship sturgeon (Acipenser nudiventris) and sterlet (Acipenser ruthenus). Each year, over a quarter of a million waterbirds nest across the Mura-Drava-Danube reserve; many of these congregate in Danube-Drava's floodplain wetlands. This corridor supports the highest density of breeding pairs of white-tailed eagle in continental Europe and each year sustains more than 250,000 migratory waterfowl, underlining the park's critical role for wetland-dependent birds.

The nearest towns – Baja (around 34,000 inhabitants) and Mohács (about 18,000) – plus smaller villages such as Kölked, Homorúd, Hercegszántó and Újmohács draw on the park for recreation and nature-based tourism, which in turn underpins local livelihoods and helps fund ongoing conservation.

On 15 September 2021, UNESCO united the five national biosphere reserves of Croatia and Hungary (2012), Serbia (2017), Slovenia (2018) and Austria (2019) into the single five-country Transboundary Biosphere Reserve "Mura–Drava–Danube", covering almost 1,000,000 hectares along over 700 kilometres of river corridors – making it Europe's largest riverine protected area, with Danube-Drava NP as one of its core zones.
