= Barcs =

- Town
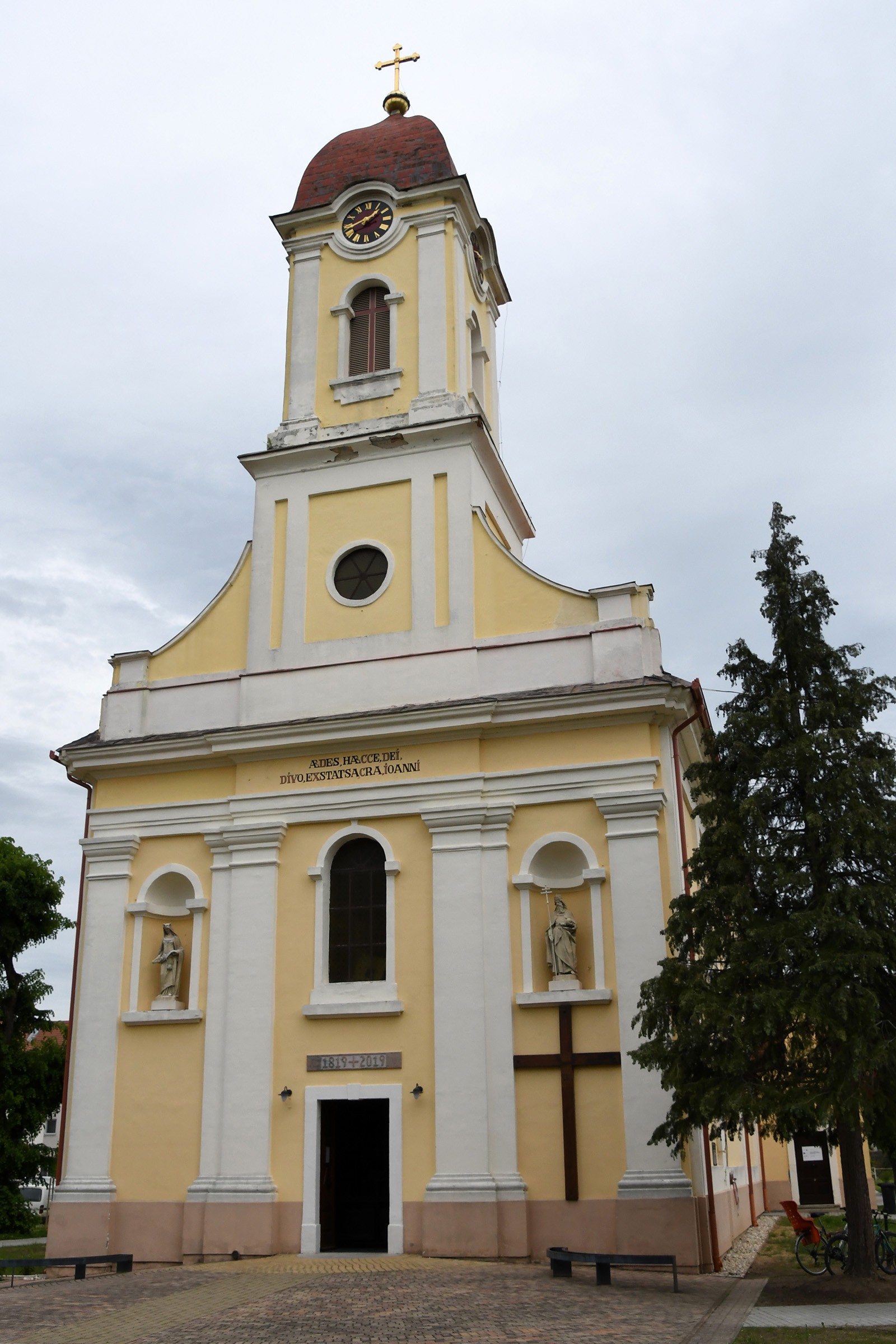
- Roman Catholic Church of Barcs

- Flag Coat of arms
- Interactive map of Barcs
- Location of Barcs
- Coordinates: 45.96013°N 17.46008°E
- Country: Hungary
- Region: Southern Transdanubia
- County: Somogy
- District: Barcs

Area
  - Total: 122.9 km^{2} (47.5 sq mi)

Population (2017)
  - Total: 10,667
  - Density: 86.79/km^{2} (224.8/sq mi)
- Demonym: barcsi

Population by ethnicity
  - Hungarians: 79.6%
  - Gypsies: 8.0%
  - Croats: 2.4%
  - Germans: 1.5%
  - Serbs: 0.1%
  - Romanians: 0.1%
  - Others: 0.8%

Population by religion
  - Roman Catholic: 50.8%
  - Calvinists: 5.1%
  - Lutherans: 0.4%
  - Other: 0.8%
  - Non-religious: 12.2%
  - Unknown: 30.6%
- Time zone: UTC+1 (CET)
  - Summer (DST): UTC+2 (CEST)
- Postal code: 7570
- Area code: (+36) 82
- Patron Saint: Christ the King
- NUTS 3 code: HU232
- MP: László Szászfalvi (KDNP)
- Website: Barcs Online

Barcs (Hungarian pronunciation: [bɒrt͡ʃ]; Croatian: Barč; German: Bartsch or Draustadt) is a border town in Somogy County, Hungary, and the seat of Barcs District. The Drava River marks the southern boundary of the settlement.

== Geography ==
Located at the Croatian border and the River Drava, the town is surrounded by the Danube-Drava National Park. It is the seat of Barcs District.

== History ==
Barcs was first mentioned between 1389 and 1417 in official documents as part of the lordship of Segesd. Its castle was first mentioned in 1460 which belonged to János and István Bakonyai at that time. In 1467 the Marzcali family owned the settlement. The Castle of Barcs was in the hands of Gergely Horváth de Gáj in 1472. István Bakonyai died in 1480 and did not leave anheir, therefore his possession went to Péter, Provost of Transylvania and royal chancellor and Orbán Nagylucsei treasurer, furthermore the brothers of Péter, Balázs and János Nagylucsei as a royal gift. Orbán Nagylucsei (Orbán Dóczy) Bishop of Eger owned it in 1489. Members of the Báthori family got Barcs in 1495 from the king. According to the tax register of 1550 its owner was András Báthori.

After the Turkish occupation the Hungarian Kingdom lost the continuous control of this region. The Ottoman Porte's tax register list 46 houses there between 1565 and 1566. It was also in the hands of Ferenc Nádasdy between 1598 and 1599. The tithe register of Pannonhalma Abbey mentioned the settlement under the suzerainty of the Castle of Szent György in 1660. In the winter of 1664 the army of Miklós Zrínyi approached the castle. The Turkish soldiers fearing the defeat left the castle. Zrínyi burnt it down.

In 1677 György Széchényi Archdiocese of Kalocsa got Barcs from Leopold I. Between 1715 and 1733 the Széchenyi family became its owner and in 1835 it was already under the suzerainty of Erdőcsokonya. In 1720 the village was half Hungarian and half Croatian. There were also some Bosniak and Šokci families. The following Croatian people lived in Barcs in 1720: Ivan Persics, Petrus Trifanovics, Stefan Odelics, Mathia Perics, Marcin Bosrineć, Georg Jalenovecz, Step. Ostarsics, Mato Pavo, Vitus Kockan, Jakobus Simoncsics, Joh. Gaglas, Mich. Jarcsok, Mathia Sokol. After 1728 the Kozarics, Kalinovic, Marics, Kukorić new Croatian families settled there. During the 1730s 21 Croatian and 14 Hungarian families lived in the village. Until 1961 other Hungarian and Croatian families arrived in Barcs. The Croats were namely Tardinacz, a Hencsar, Simotics and Ottarsics. Also several families moved away. At the beginning of the 20th century Imre Széchenyi had lands there.

In the winter of 1848 Josip Jelačić Ban of Croatia attacked Barcs. A troop of border guards started to shoot the settlement with cannons. One of the cannon balls still can be seen on the wall of the Roman Catholic church. The Croats occupied the village, but after some months they had to retreat.

According to the 1849 census Barcs had 1,594 residents of which 300 Hungarians, 787 Germans and 487 Slavic-speaking people. There were 1,452 Roman Catholics, 113 Protestants, 7 Orthodox and 2 Jews. Four years later in 1953 there were 1,438 residents of which 254 were Hungarians, 725 Germans, 429 Croats, 15 Jews and 14 Romani.

There was a great conflagration in 1857. The oldest building of Barcs is the salt and tobacco warehouse which was built in Classicist style, today it is a protected dwelling house. It was used for storing wares from ships which transported them on the River Drava. During the second half of the 20th century Barcs started to develop intensively its industry until the Treaty of Trianon. After the First World War agriculture related production facilities like leather and flax fabrics, slaughterhouses, milk and cheese factories as well as distilleries were built. Its electric system was also built up at that time. Drávapálfalva merged into Barcs in 1928.

In 1910 it had 6,415 residents of which 4,529 were Hungarians, 1,477 Germans and 238 Croats. According to their religious affiliation there were 5,314 Roman Catholics, 289 Calvinists and 659 Jews.

In 1918 it came under Serbian occupation and the newly formed State of Slovenes, Croats and Serbs claimed the territory despite the fact that it was adjudicated to Hungary in the Treaty of Trianon. For some months it became part of the Serbian-Hungarian Baranya-Baja Republic.

During the Soviet occupation the structure of the industry transformed. The construction material production, mill industry, wood processing and the chemical industry got stronger and became the leading sectors in the economy of Barcs. It got town rights in 1979 when Drávaszentes and Somogytarnóca merged.

On the evening of October 27, 1991 a Yugoslavian aircraft flew over the territory of Hungary and dropped two cluster bombs at the edge of the town. Luckily, there were no casualties. Some houses were seriously damaged.

=== Drávapálfalva ===
Drávapálfalva was first mentioned in medieval documents and belonged to the Győr genus. Miklós Dersfi got this village in 1346. But during the Turkish occupation it perished. The Széchényi family settled here Germans and Hungarians who re-established the settlement. It belonged to Pál Széchényi in 1856, later to Ferenc Széchényi. At the beginning of the 20th century Mór Kremsier became its owner who had a distillery and a steam mill in Belcsa-puszta. In 1880 the half of the houses burnt down. It had 1,179 residents in 1910 of which 819 were Hungarians, 275 Germans and 81 Romani. According to their religious affiliation there were 1,026 Roman Catholics, 106 Calvinists and 23 Jews.

Belcsa-puszta, Oláh-telep and Zátonyi-szőlőhegy belonged to Drávapálfalva.

=== Drávaszentes ===
Drávaszentes also existed before the Turkish occupation, but like many other settlements in the region perished. In 1677 György Széchényi Archdiocese of Kalocsa got Drávaszentes from Leopold I as a royal gift. In 1703 it was uninhabited and belonged to György Széchényi. The Széchényi family settled Hungarians in the village. There were also some Slovene families who came to Drávaszentes in 1760, namely the Palecsnik, Melanecz, Vojkovic, Novalovrecz, Skafer, Vinkovics families. The majority of the population spoke Hungarian, therefore these families assimilated in just a few generations. Its Roman Catholic church was built in 1895. There was a huge conflagration in 1881. The village was known for its local manufactured iron tools. According to the 1910 census it had 673 residents of which 672 were Hungarians, furthermore 652 Roman Catholics, 10 Calvinists and 9 Jews.

=== Somogytarnóca ===
Somogytarnóca was first mentioned in 1231 as the possession of the Tibold genus. It also perished during the Turkish rule. According to István Iványosi-Szabó several residents of Tarnóca flew to Kecskemét during the Turkish occupation. In 1677 it came into the hands of György Széchényi Archdiocese of Kalocsa. The Széchényi family built a mansion, distillery and steam mill there during the 19th century.

=== Aszaló ===
There was a medieval settlement which also perished. After the Turkish occupation Hungarians settled there. According to László Szita the settlement was completely Hungarian in the 18th century.

=== Aranyas ===
Aranya was first mentioned between 1332 and 1337 in the papal tithe register and it had already its own parish. In 1389 it belonged to Segesd. In the Ottoman Porte's tax register there were two independent villages with this name: Felső Aranyas (English: Upper Aranyas) and Alsó Aranyas (English: Lower Aranyas), both with five households respectively. Around 1565 and 1566 they had four houses. In 1571 Felső Arnas had two and Alsó Arnas had seven households. It was uninhabited and belonged to Zsigmond Széchényi between 1726 and 1733.

=== Tarnóczagyöngyös ===
Tarnóczagyöngyös was formerly known as Györgyös as belonged to the Mérey and Lengyel families. From 1733 it was the possession of Zsigmond Széchényi.

=== Tarcsa ===
Tarcsa-puszta was also a medieval village which perished. The Ottoman tax register of 1554 lists 12 houses there, in 1571 37 houses. Fáni-major, Feri-major, Kistarnócza-puszta, Vadas-puszta, Antal-major, Pusztamalom belonged to Tarcsa.

=== Vukovár ===
There was also a village with the same name before Turkish times. Its residents fled to the forests and established smaller farms.

=== Szentmihály ===
In the papal tithe register of 1332-1337 it can be found as Szent-Mihály and in 1536 tax register as Barcsi-Szent-Mihály.

== Economy ==
Besides tourism the production sector has also a significant share in the town's economy. There are several production facilities of companies like the Hungarian dairy producer Dráva Tej, the wood producers Dráva Fabrika, DRÁVA Faipari Művek (est. 1878) and Magyar Plan (owned by the Italian FLORIAN GROUP), the Hungarian joinery manufacturer H-fa, the Hungarian communal machine producer Seres, the Hungarian meat producer Dráva Natura, the German-Hungarian industrial machine manufacturer AVERMANN-HORVÁTH, the Hungarian container producer Barcs Metál and the Hungarian electric network manufacturer Transzkábel.

== Main sights ==
- Roman Catholic church – built between 1814 and 1821
- Széchenyi Mansion and its 3 ha park – built in 1875, located in Somogytarnóca
- Jégmadár tourist boat – starts on every Sunday at 2 pm and travels 90 minutes on the River Drava showing the nature around the river
- Dráva Museum – established in 1979, museum of the cultural and historical heritage of the people living in Inner Somogy and along the River Drava
- Chapel of the Széchényi family – built in 1907
- Old juniper – protected since 1974
- Spa and Recreational Centre of Barcs – 55 °C water rich in NaHCO_{3} from 1317 m deep. It is used to heal muscular problems and inflammation.
- Old Jewish cemetery
- Kremsier Mansion in Belcsapuszta
- Tree of Patkó Bankdi, the famous Hungarian betyár
- Mermaid sculpture by László Komáromi

== Notable people ==
- Pál Losonczi (1919–2005), politician, President of the Presidential Council of the Hungarian People's Republic
- Ottó Karvalics (born 1947), politician, mayor of Barcs (since 2010)
- Katalin Szili (born 1956), politician, speaker of the National Assembly (2002–2009)
- László Berényi (born 1961), politician
- Béla Koplárovics (born 1981), footballer
- Krisztián Koller (born 1983), footballer

== Media ==
- HÍD TV
- Dráva Hullám 102.7
- Aqua Rádió 100.6

== Twin towns – sister cities ==
Barcs is twinned with:

- Knittelfeld, Austria
- Odorheiu Secuiesc, Romania
- Sinsheim, Germany
- Virovitica, Croatia
- Želiezovce, Slovakia

== Gallery ==
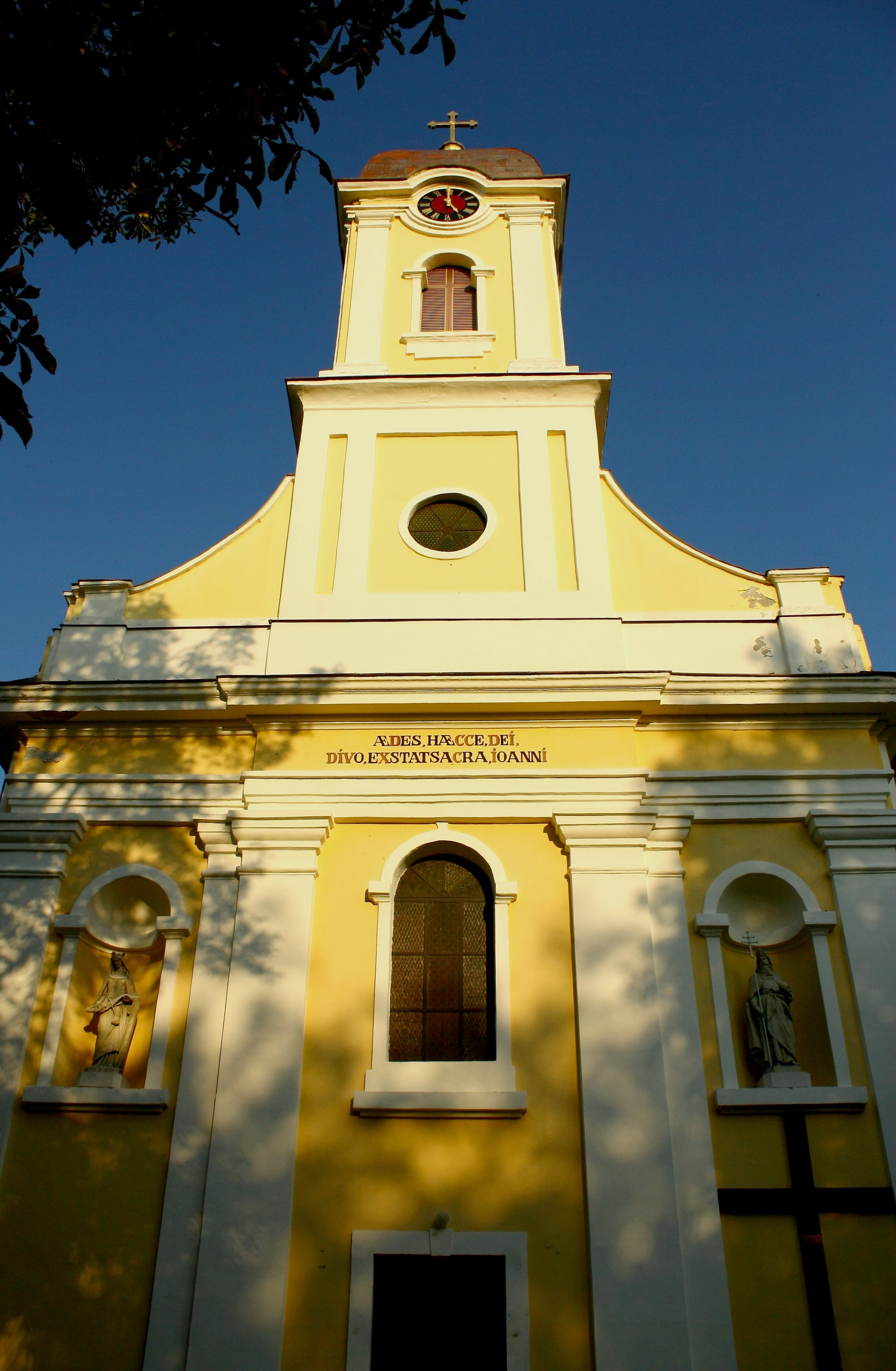
Roman Catholic Church of Barcs

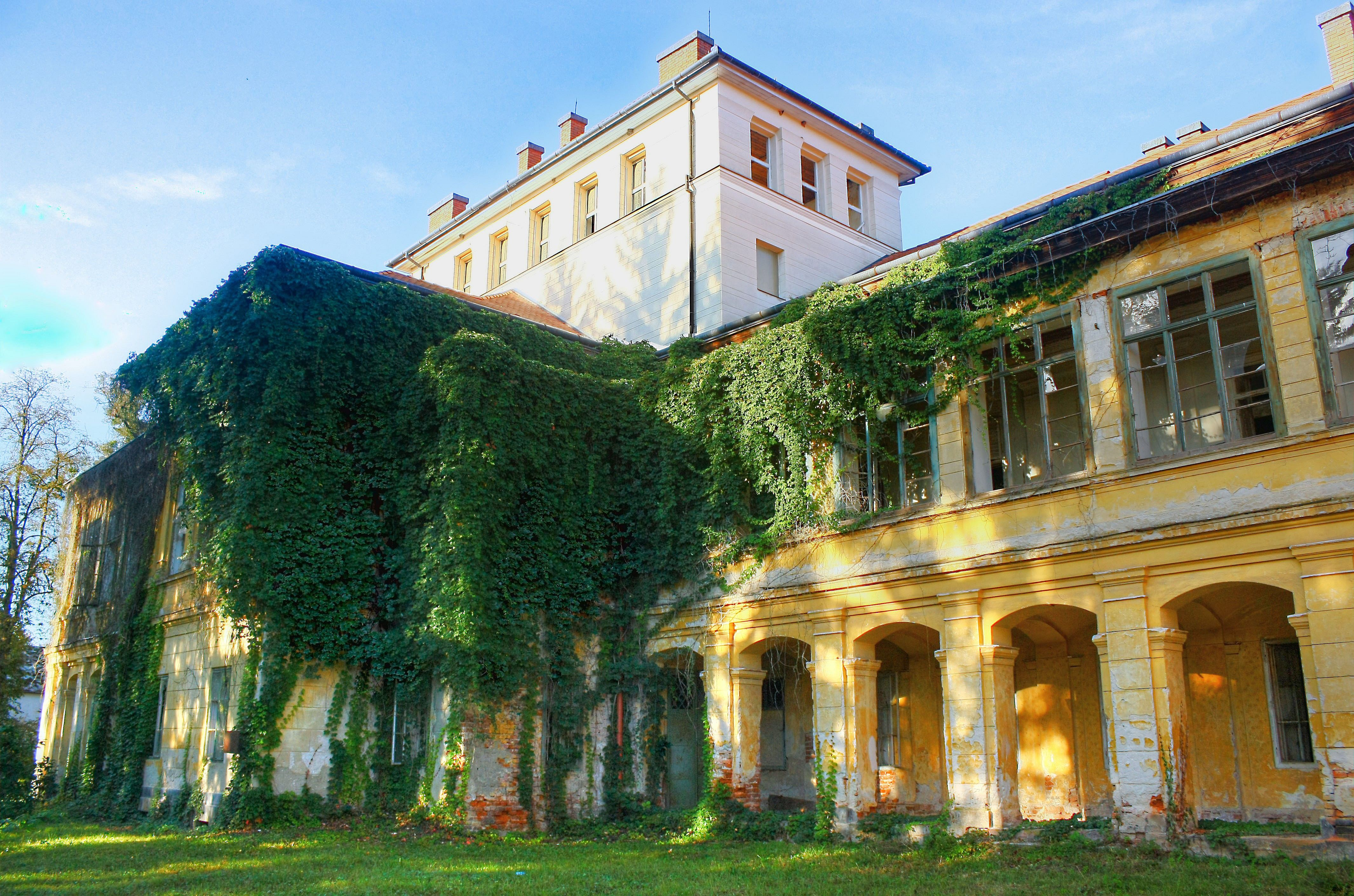
Széchenyi Mansion

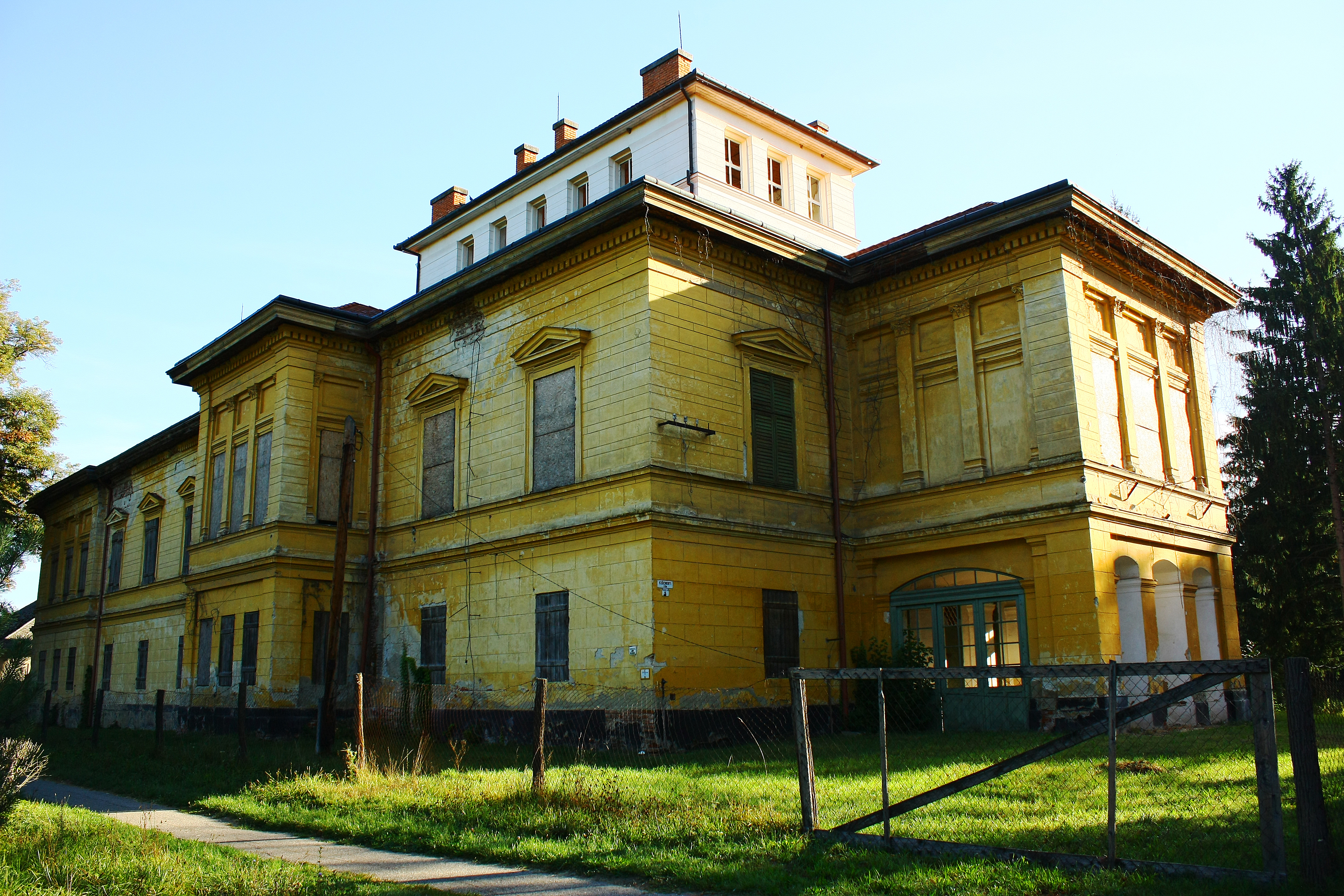
Széchenyi Mansion

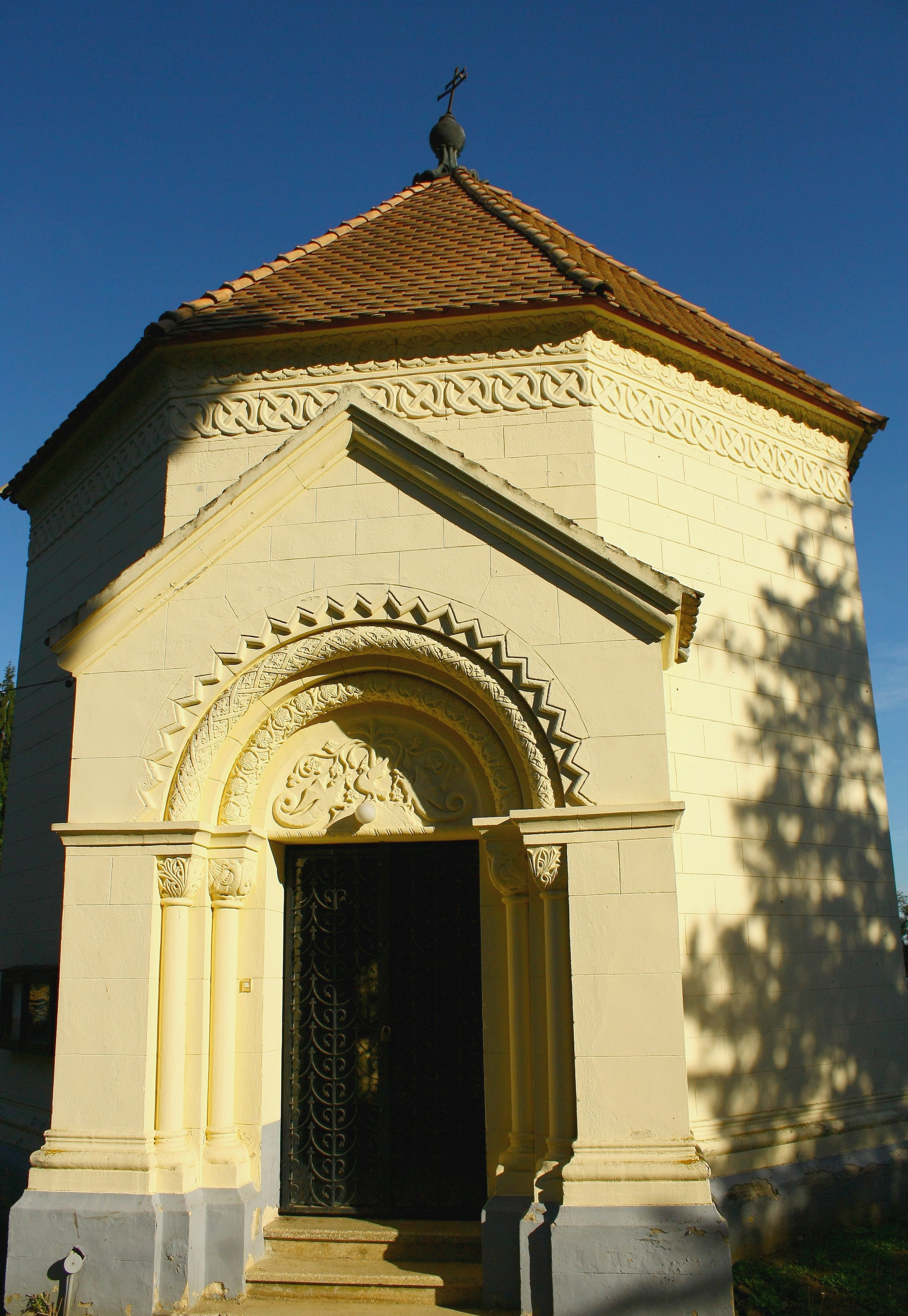
Chapel of the cemetery

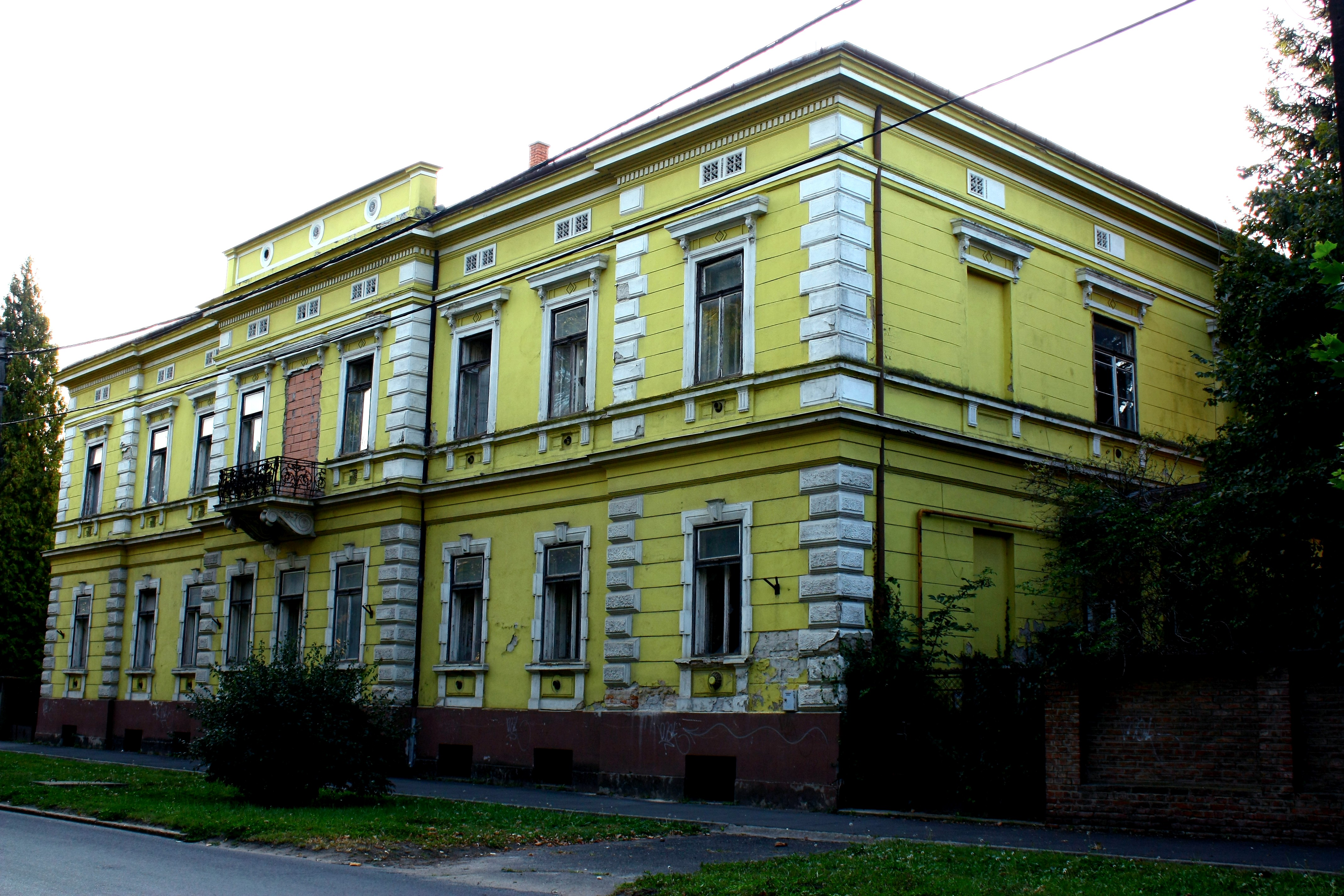
Town Court of Barcs

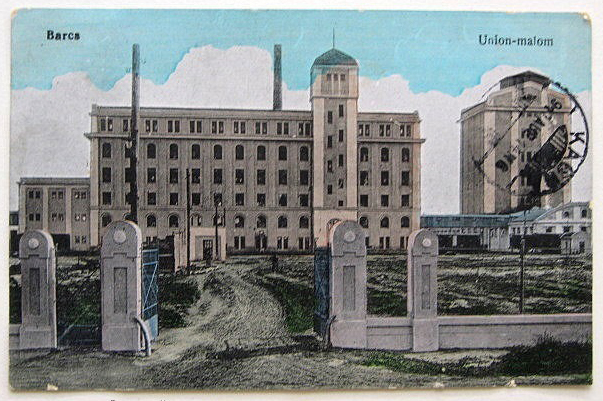
Union Flour Mill (1923)
