= László Szászfalvi =

Hungarian politician, pastor (born 1961)

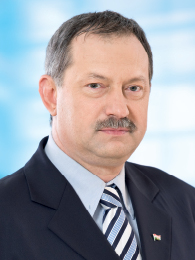

Member of the National Assembly
- In office 18 June 1998 – 8 May 2026

Secretary of State for Churches, Minorities and Civil Affairs
- In office 2 June 2010 – 10 July 2012
- Succeeded by: György Hölvényi

Personal details
- Born: 11 January 1961 (age 65) Makó, Hungary
- Party: MDF (1989–2004); Fidesz (since 2005)
- Children: Bence; Boglárka; Lenke
- Profession: pastor, politician

László Szászfalvi (born 11 January 1961) is a Hungarian Calvinist pastor, theologian and politician, Member of Parliament for Marcali from 1998 to 2014, then for Barcs from 2014 to 2026. He served as Secretary of State for Churches, Minorities and Civil Affairs between 2010 and 2012. He also served as mayor of Csurgó from 1990 to 2003 and from 2006 to 2010. He did not run in the 2026 Hungarian parliamentary election.
