= Southern Transdanubia =

Coordinates: 46°04′15″N 18°13′59″E

Southern Transdanubia Dél-Dunántúl
- Region
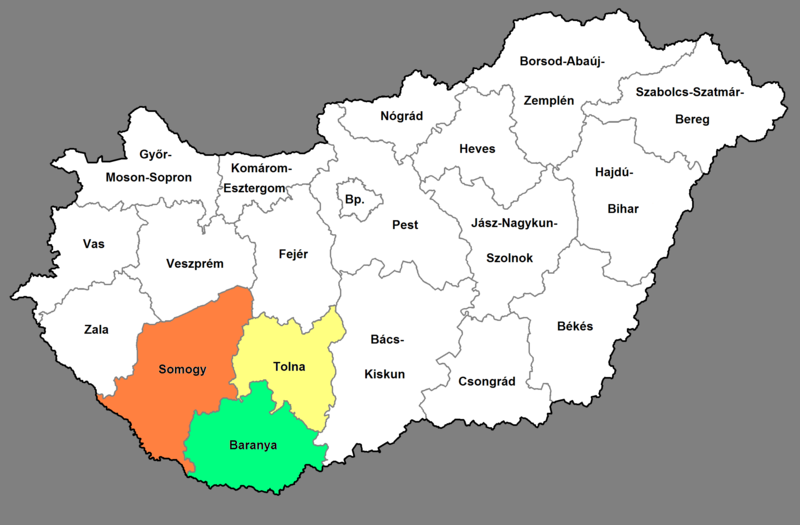
- Country: Hungary
- Region: Transdanubia
- Seat: Pécs

Area
  - Total: 14,197 km^{2} (5,481 sq mi)

Population (2024)
  - Total: 852,420
  - Density: 60.042/km^{2} (155.51/sq mi)

GDP
  - Total: €12.024 billion (2024)
  - Per capita: €14,230 (2024)
- Time zone: UTC+1 (CET)
  - Summer (DST): UTC+2 (CEST)
- NUTS code: HU23
- HDI (2022): 0.841 very high · 5th

Southern Transdanubia (Hungarian: Dél-Dunántúl ['deːl ˈdunaːntuːl]) is a subdivision of Hungary as defined by the Nomenclature of Territorial Units for Statistics (NUTS). It is one of the eight classified NUTS-2 statistical regions of Hungary. The region incorporates the south-western parts of the country, and encompasses an area of 14,197 km^{2} (5,481 sq mi). It incorporates three counties –Somogy, Tolna, and Baranya. With a population of just over 0.85 million, it is the least populated of the all the regions in Hungary. The seat of the region and the largest city is Pécs.

== Classification ==
The country of Hungary was organized into eight regions for administrative purposes by the amendments of Act XXI of 1996. The Nomenclature of Territorial Units for Statistics (NUTS) organizes the country into three broader level sub-divisions. These are classified as a NUTS-2 statistical regions of Hungary, and incorporate one or more counties within it. The regions form the NUTS-3 territorial units under them.

== Geography ==
Southern Transdanubia incorporates the south-western parts of the country, encompassing an area of 14,197 km^{2} (5,481 sq mi). The region is located in Central Europe, and is completely land locked as Hungary does not have access to sea. It shares an international land border with Croatia in the south. It is bordered by Southern Great Plain to the east, Central Transdanubia to the north, and Western Transdanubia to the north-west. The region is fertile, and rich in minerals. The region has numerous thermal springs.

=== Sub-regions ===
Southern Transdanubia incorporates three counties –Baranya, Somogy, and Tolna.

Counties
County	Coat of arms	Seat	NUTS Code	Area	Population (2019)	Map	Districts	Municipalities
Baranya		Pécs	HU231	4,429.6 km^{2} (1,710.3 sq mi)	360,704	Map of Hungary highlighting Baranya County	10	301
Somogy		Kaposvár	HU232	6,065.06 km^{2} (2,341.73 sq mi)	301,429	Map of Hungary highlighting Somogy County	8	245
Tolna		Szekszárd	HU233	3,073.2 km^{2} (1,186.6 sq mi)	217,463	Map of Hungary highlighting Tolna County	6	109
Southern Transdanubia		Pécs	HU23	14,197 km^{2} (5,481 sq mi)	879,596		24	655

== Demographics and economy ==
With a population of just over 0.85 million, Southern Transdanubia is the least populated of the all the regions in Hungary. The population is largely rural.

The mineral wealth of the region has led to the establishment of several industrial zones and parks. Mining of uranium, coal, and limestone is carried out in the region. As 80% of the land in the region is arable, agriculture is a major economic activity. The region is a major center for wine production. With the availability of coal, and the presence of the only Hungarian nuclear power station at Paks, the region is amongst the major producers of electricity in the country. Owing to the presence of water springs and Lake Balaton, Tourism is well developed in the region, and the region ranks third in the number of tourist visits in Hungary.

== See also ==
- List of regions of Hungary
