= Solar power in Hungary =

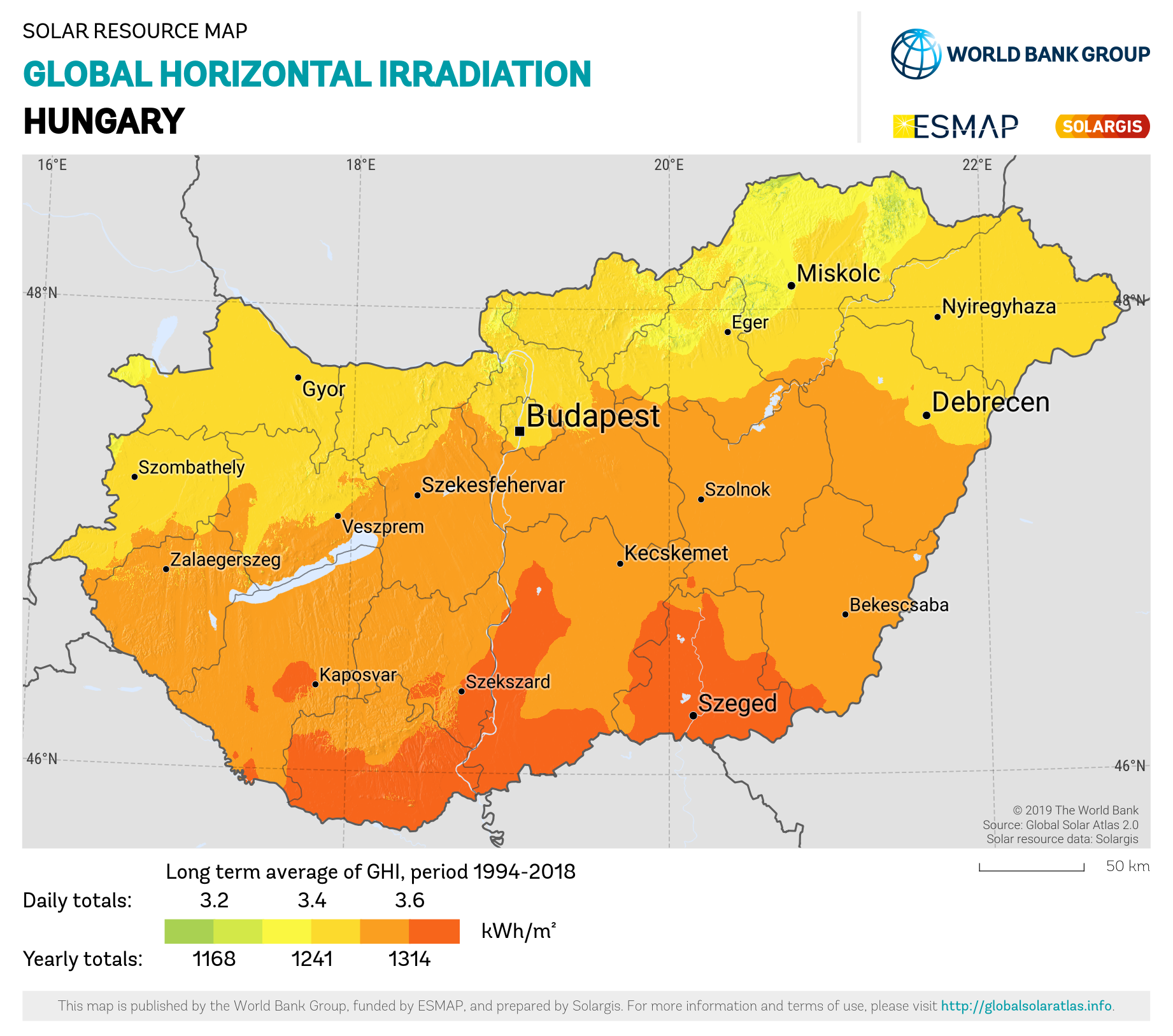
- Solar irradiation map of Hungary
- Installed capacity: 8 GW (2024) (24)
- Annual generation: 9 TWh (2024)
- Capacity per capita: 781 W (2024)
- Share of electricity: 27% (2025)

Solar power in Hungary has been rapidly advancing due to government support and declining system prices. By the end of 2023 Hungary had just over 5.8 GW of photovoltaics capacity, a massive increase from a decade prior. Solar power accounted for 27.29% of the country's electricity generation in 2025, up from less than 0.03% in 2012.

In 2023, the country's Minister of Energy, Csaba Lantos, predicted Hungary's target for 6,000 MW of PV capacity by 2030 would likely be exceeded twice over, hitting 12,000 MW instead. 2024 statistics confirmed the previous 6,000 MW by 2030 target was exceeded six years early, with PV capacity rising to 7,550 MW and solar power producing a record 24.8% of national electricity generation - the highest in the EU.

== Installed capacity ==
Hungary solar power development
Year	Capacity (MW)	Watts per capita	Electricity generation %
2010	2	<1	<0.1%
2020	2,131	221	7.04%
2024	7,699	803	24.21%

== List of photovoltaic power stations ==
Largest photovoltaic power stations of Hungary.
≥25MW_{p}; 10MW_{p}–25MW_{p}.

List of the largest photovoltaic power stations (≥10MWp)
Rank	Name	MWp	Location	Opened
1	Mezőcsát Solar Park	250	Mezőcsát	2023
2	Lumen Park Szolnok	138	Szolnok	2023
3	Inárcs Solar Power Plant	132	Inárcs	2023
4	Kaposvár Solar Park	100	Kaposvár	2021
5	Lumen Park Szászberek	68	Szászberek	2024
6	Tázlár Solar Park	63	Tázlár	2022
7	Gerjen Solar Park	51	Gerjen	2022
8	Kiskunhalas Solar Park	48	Kiskunhalas	2023
9	Söjtör Solar Park	45	Söjtör	2022
10	Kaba Solar Park	43	Kaba	2020
11	Kapuvár Solar Park	25	Kapuvár	2020
12	Paks Solar Park	20.6	Paks	2019
13	Tereske Solar Park	20	Tereske	2024
14	Bátonyterenye–Mátraverebély Solar Park	20	Bátonyterenye, Mátraverebély	2021
15	Mátra Solar Power Plant	20	Bükkábrány	2019
16	Mátra Solar Power Plant	20	Halmajugra	2019
17	Felsőzsolca Solar Park	20	Felsőzsolca	2018
18	Duna Solar Park	17.6	Százhalombatta	2018
19	Szügy Solar Park	16.5	Szügy	2019
20	Mátra Solar Power Plant	16	Visonta	2015
21	Tiszaszőlős Solar Park	11.6	Tiszaszőlős	2019
22	Pécs Solar Park	10	Pécs	2016

Photovoltaic power stations (<10MWp)

- Csepreg - 5.5MWp
- Vép - 4.5MWp
- Monor - 4MWp
- Sajóbábony - 0.5MWp
- Bojt - 0.499MWp
- Sellye
- Szombathely - 0.385MWp

=== Under construction and proposed solar parks ===
- MOL Solar Parks; Füzesgyarmat, Tiszaújváros and Százhalombatta 18.38 MW (second half of 2019)
- Alteo Solar Parks; Balatonberény and Nagykőrös 7-7 MW (2019 June)
- Photon Energy Solar Pakrs; Fertőd 0.5 MW, Almásfüzitő 5.5 MW and Tiszakécske 5.5 MW (second half of 2019)
- Solar Markt Solar Pakrs; Söjtör 3.1 MW, and Kőszeg 3.9 MW (second half of 2019)

=== Biggest owners ===
- MVM Group:

More than 5 MWp: Felsőzsolca, Paks, Pécs, Visonta
Less than 5 MWp:

- MET Power: Százhalombatta
- Solar Markt: Csepreg, Kőszeg, Söjtör, Vép
- ALTEO Group: Balatonberény (7 MWp), Nagykőrös (7 MWp), Monor (4 MWp)
- SolServices Kft: Szolnok (138 MWp), Szászberek (68 MWp ),

== See also ==
- Renewable energy in Hungary
- Energy in Hungary
- List of renewable energy topics by country
- Solar power in the European Union
