= Mátra Solar Power Plant =

Photovoltaic power station in Hungary

- Country: Hungary
- Location: Visonta
- Coordinates: 47°48′N 20°03′E
- Status: Completed
- Commission date: 2015
- Construction cost: 6.5 billion Ft
- Owner: MVM Group

Solar farm
- Type: Flat-panel PV

Power generation
- Units operational: 72,480
- Nameplate capacity: 16 MW

Mátra Solar Power Plant is a large thin-film photovoltaic (PV) power system, built on a 30 ha (74 acres) plot of land located in Visonta in Hungary. The solar park has around 72,480 state-of-the-art thin film PV panels for a total nameplate capacity of 16-megawatts, and was finished in November 2015.

The installation is located in the Heves County in north-eastern Hungary near Visonta. The investment cost for the Visonta solar park amounts to some 6.5 billion Hungarian forint.

This is the third largest photovoltaics producing plant in Hungary and the second largest in Northern Hungary. (until 2019)

== See also ==
- Energy policy of the European Union
- Photovoltaics
- Renewable energy commercialization
- Renewable energy in the European Union
- Solar power in Hungary
