= Energy in Hungary =

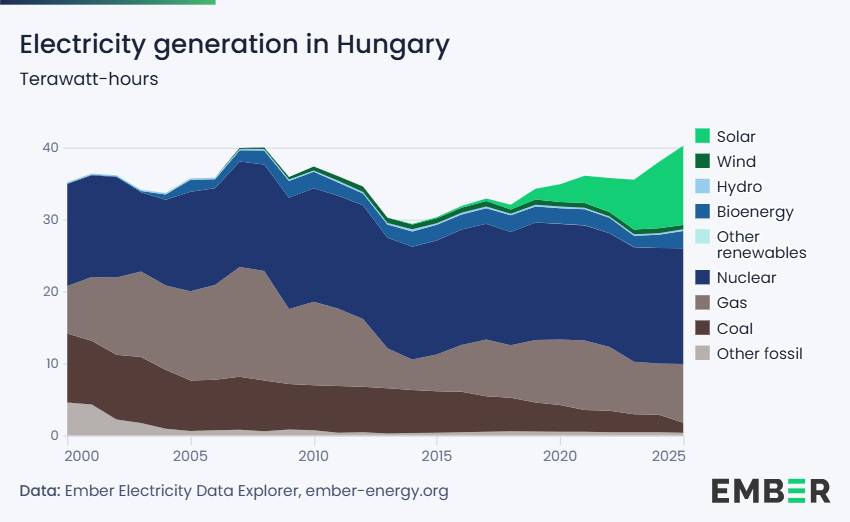
Hungary electricity generation by source in terawatt-hours

As of 2024, almost half of energy in Hungary is imported, with nuclear being the main domestic source.

== Statistics ==
2020 energy statistics

Production capacities for electricity (billion kWh)
| Type | Amount |
|---|---|
| Nuclear | 43.81 |
| Fossil fuel | 34.38 |
| Solar | 7.05 |
| Biomass | 6.95 |
| Wind power | 1.90 |
| Hydro | 0.01 |
| Total | 93.10 |

Electricity (billion kWh)
| Category | Amount |
|---|---|
| Consumption | 41.53 |
| Production | 32.99 |
| Import | 19.18 |
| Export | 7.50 |

Natural Gas (billion m^{3})
| Consumption | 10.55 |
| Production | 1.69 |
| Import | 11.68 |
| Export | 3.76 |

Crude Oil (barrels per day)
| Consumption | 180,600 |
| Production | 35,200 |
| Import | 134,800 |
| Export | 8,000 |

CO_{2} emissions:
44.77 million tons

== Nuclear power ==
Hungary had, in 2017, four operating nuclear power reactors, constructed between 1982 and 1987, at the Paks Nuclear Power Plant.

An agreement in 2014 with the EU and an agreement between Hungary and Rosatom may result in an additional two reactors being built for operation in 2030. The cost, estimated at €12.5bn, being funded mainly by Russia.

== Oil ==
Hungary is reliant on oil from Russia for 46% of its needs in 2021, a decrease from 80% in 2013.

An EU exemption to sanctions, following the Russian invasion of Ukraine in 2022 allows Hungary to continue importing oil from Russia until December 2023.

MOL Group is an oil and gas group in Hungary.

== Gas ==
Emfesz is a natural gas distributor in Hungary. Panrusgáz imports natural gas from Russia mainly Gazprom.

The Arad–Szeged pipeline is a natural gas pipeline from Arad (Romania) to Szeged (Hungary).

Nabucco and South Stream gas pipelines were intended to reach Hungary and further to other European countries. The Nabucco gas pipeline was expected to pipe 31bn cubic metres of gas annually in a 3,300 km long pipeline constructed via Hungary, Turkey, Romania, Bulgaria and Austria. The South Stream gas pipeline was expected to pipe 63bn cu m of gas from southern Russia to Bulgaria under the Black Sea. The pipe was planned to run via Hungary to central and southern Europe. These two were abandoned early in their design phases by a mix of disinterest, changing priorities and changes in geopolitical conditions in the larger Black Sea basin.

Hungary in 2022 is reliant on Russia for 80% of its natural gas and seeks to continue buying from Gazprom. In October 2023 Bulgaria passed a law taxing Russian gas in transit to Hungary at 20 levs (10.22 euro) per MWh, roughly 20% of the purchase price of gas, the cost is probably payable by Gazprom. Hungary has complained about the tax.

== Coal ==
The last coal electricity producer, the Matra Power Plant produced around 9% of the electricity needs of Hungary in 2020. It is served by two coal mines in Visonta, and in Bükkábrány. The current generator is to shut down in 2025 to be replaced by a CCGT unit.

== Renewable energy ==
Hungary renewable electricity production by source

Hungary is a member of the European Union and thus takes part in the EU strategy to increase its share of the renewable energy. The EU has adopted the 2009 Renewable Energy Directive, which included a 20% renewable energy target by 2020 for the EU. By 2030 wind should produce in average 26-35% of the EU's electricity and save Europe €56 billion a year in avoided fuel costs.

The national authors of Hungary forecast is 14.7% renewables in gross energy consumption by 2020, exceeding their 13% binding target by 1.7 percentage points. Hungary is the EU country with the smallest forecast penetration of renewables of the electricity demand in 2020, namely only 11% (including biomass 6% and wind power 3%). The forecast includes 400 MW of new wind power capacity between 2010 and 2020. EWEA's 2009 forecast expects Hungary to reach 1.2 GW of installed wind capacity in this time. In the end of 2010 wind power capacity was 295 MW.

=== Wind power ===
No new wind farms have been built since 2012, with a law in 2016 effectively banning wind farms in Hungary by requiring they be built further than 12km from any community. Capacity in 2022 is 330MW. In 2022 Hungary published a Recovery and Resilience Plan outlining a total of HUF 2,300 billion (ca. EUR 6 billion) for strategic development projects with the energy sector, which may result in additional wind farms being built.

==== Solar power ====
Hungary had 4.8GW capacity for solar power in 2022, having grown from 26MW in 2016. The 2030 National Energy Strategy target is for 6GW capacity. As of 2023, the installed solar power capacity was 5835 MW. As of 2023, solar energy accounted for 18.4% of the country's total electricity production.

== Carbon emissions ==
In 2007, emissions of carbon dioxide totalled 53.9 million tonnes or around 5.4 tonnes per capita when the EU-27 average was 7.9 tonnes per capita.
