= Visonta coal mine =

Lignite mine in Hungary

Visonta Coal Mine
- Interactive map of Visonta Coal Mine
- Location: Detk, Heves County, Hungary; 47.7621048°N 20.0487096°E
- Products: Lignite
- Company: Mátrai Erőmű Zrt.
- Website: http://www.mert.hu

The Visonta Coal Mine ([viʃontɒ]) is an open pit lignite mine located near Gyöngyös, Heves County, in Hungary. It is the smallest lignite mine in Hungary out of three lignite mines in total. The mine has coal reserves amounting to 400 million tonnes of lignite, one of the largest coal reserves in Europe and the world and has an annual production of 3.9 million tonnes of coal.

== Location and structure ==
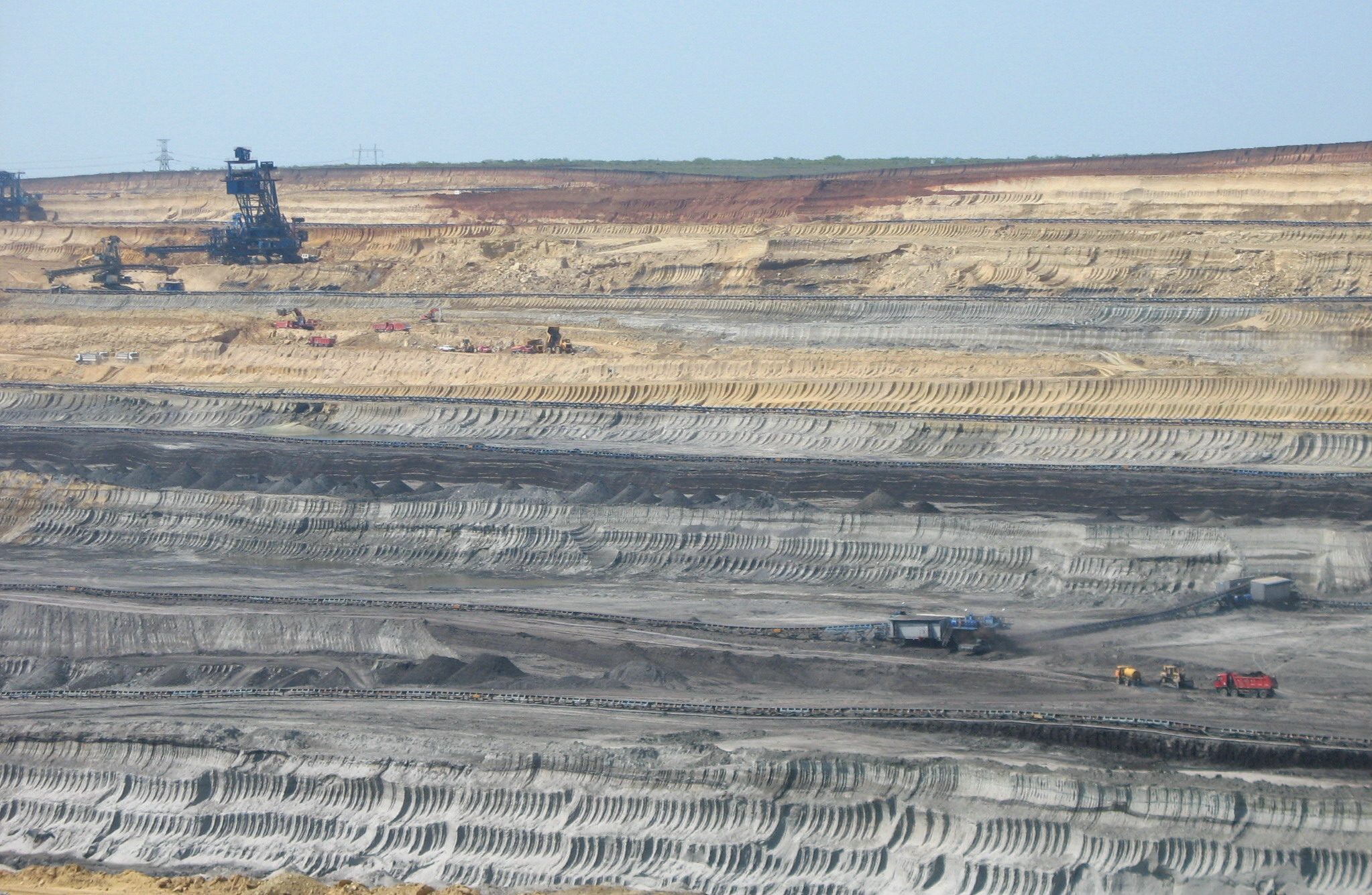
Figure 1-1 South Pit, May 2007

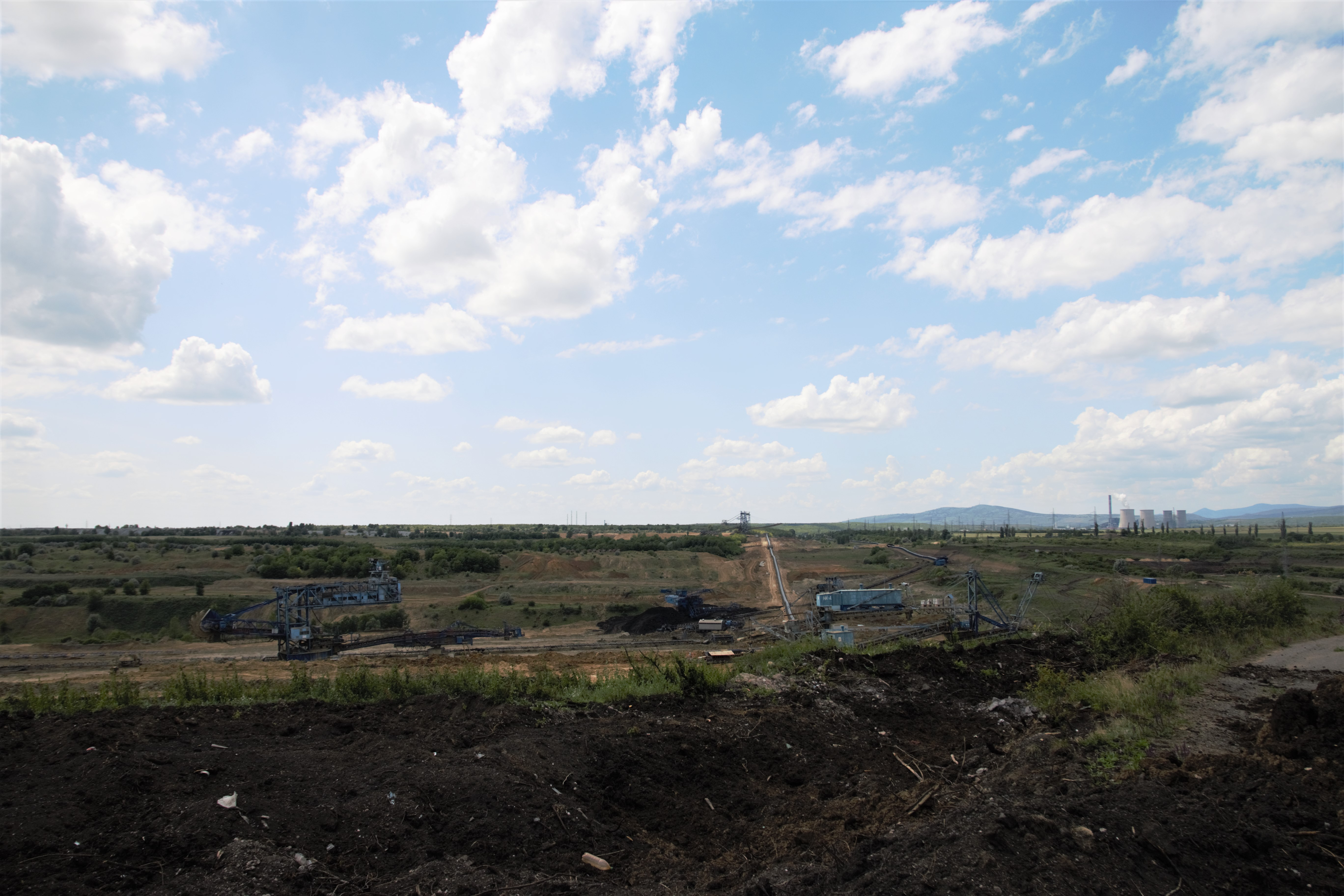
Figure 1-2 View from the north of the East Pit II section towards the west, May 2018

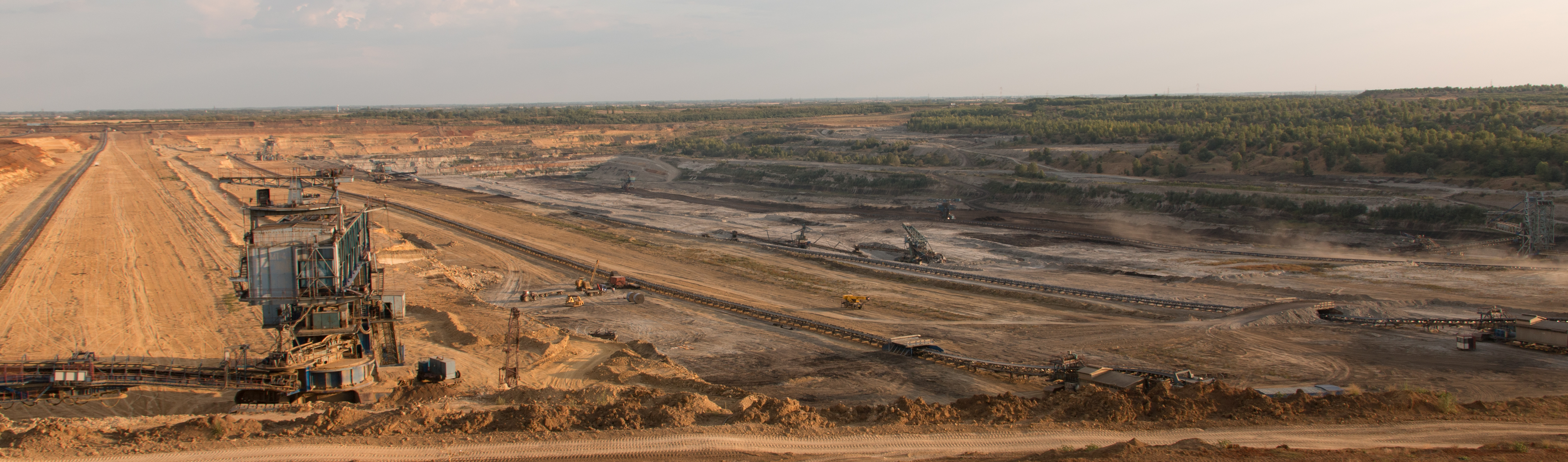
Figure 1-3 View onto the East Pit III section, August 2022

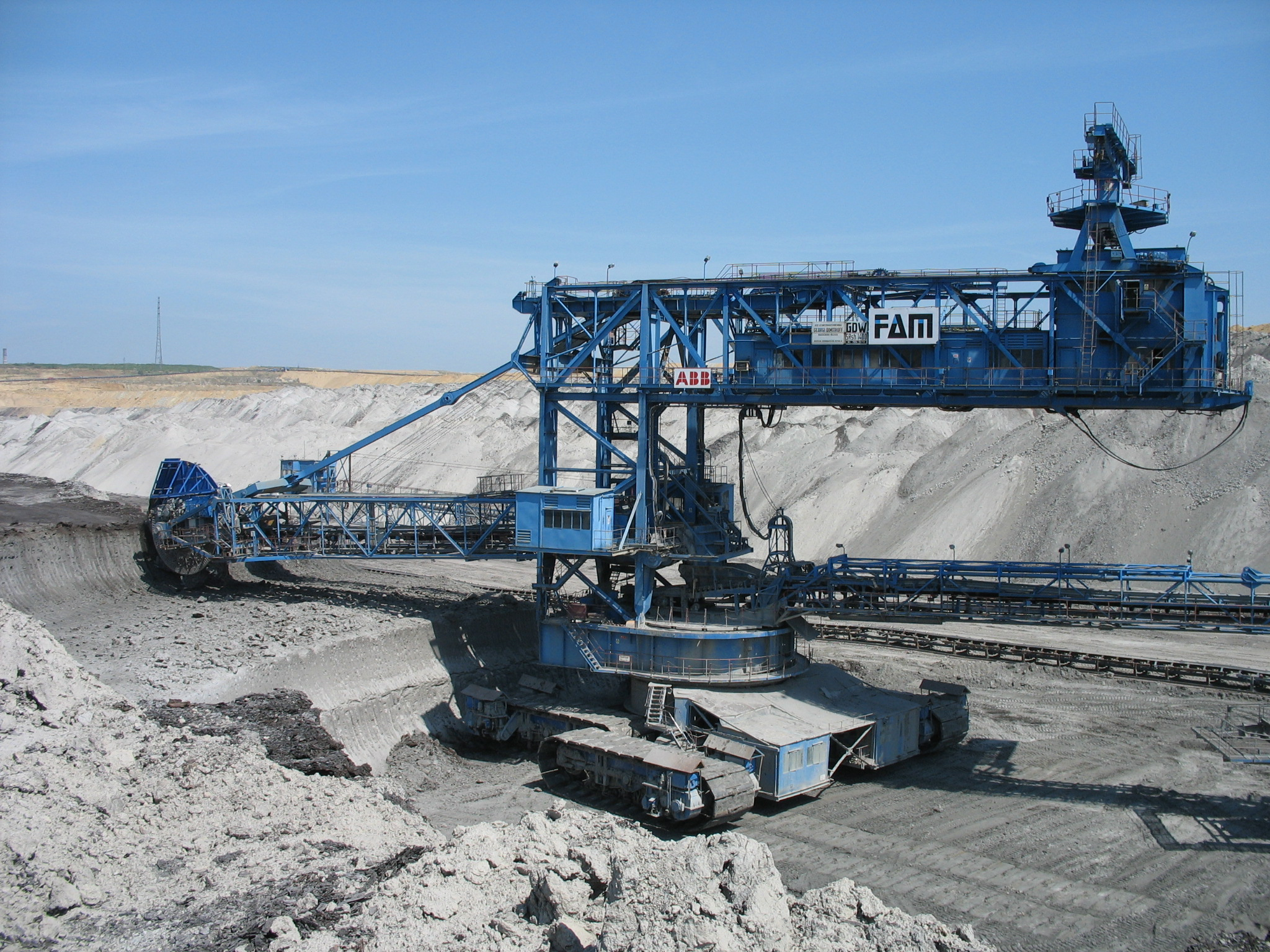
Figure 2-1 Bucket excavator in the South Pit section, in 2007

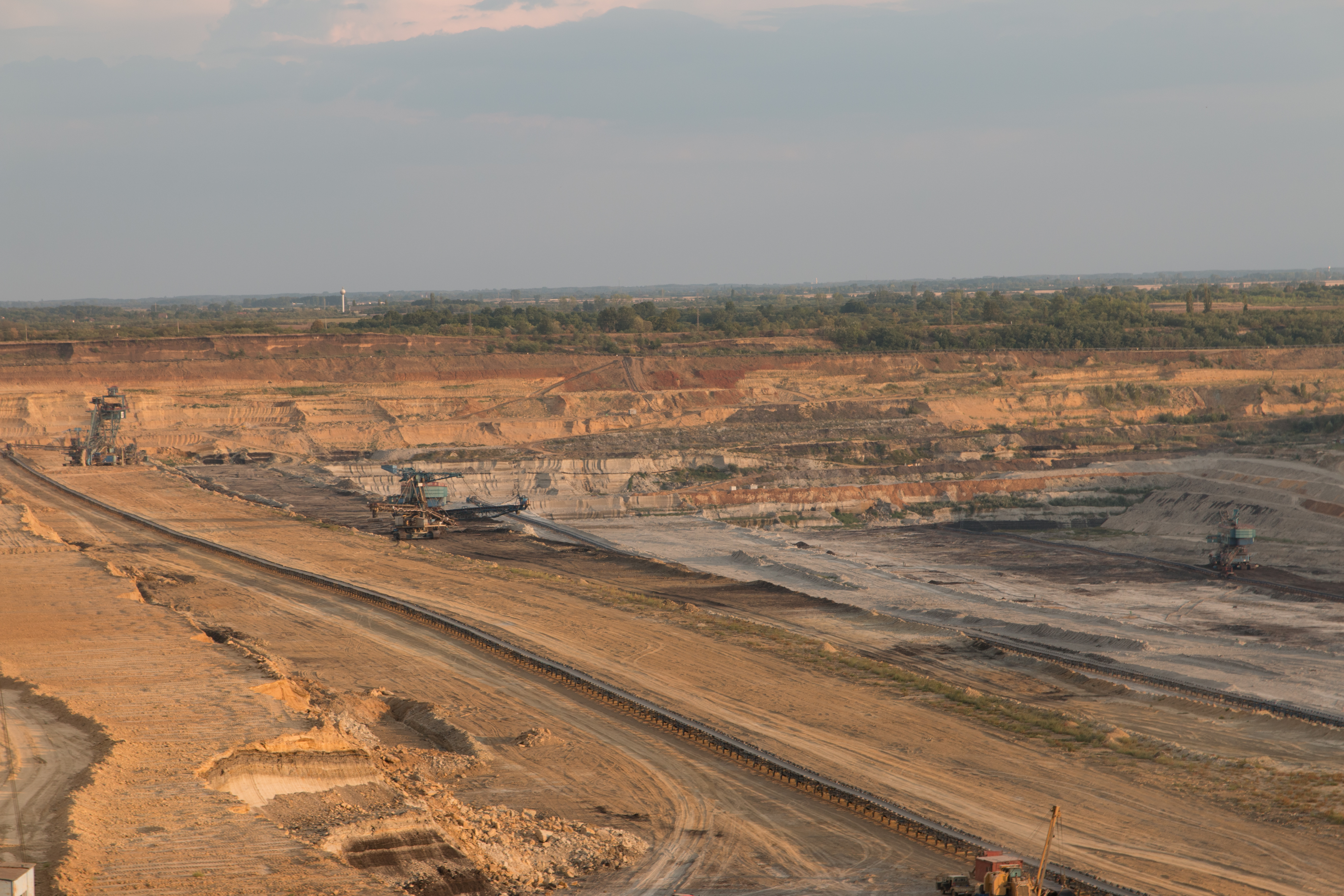
Figure 1-4 East Pit III section, August 2022

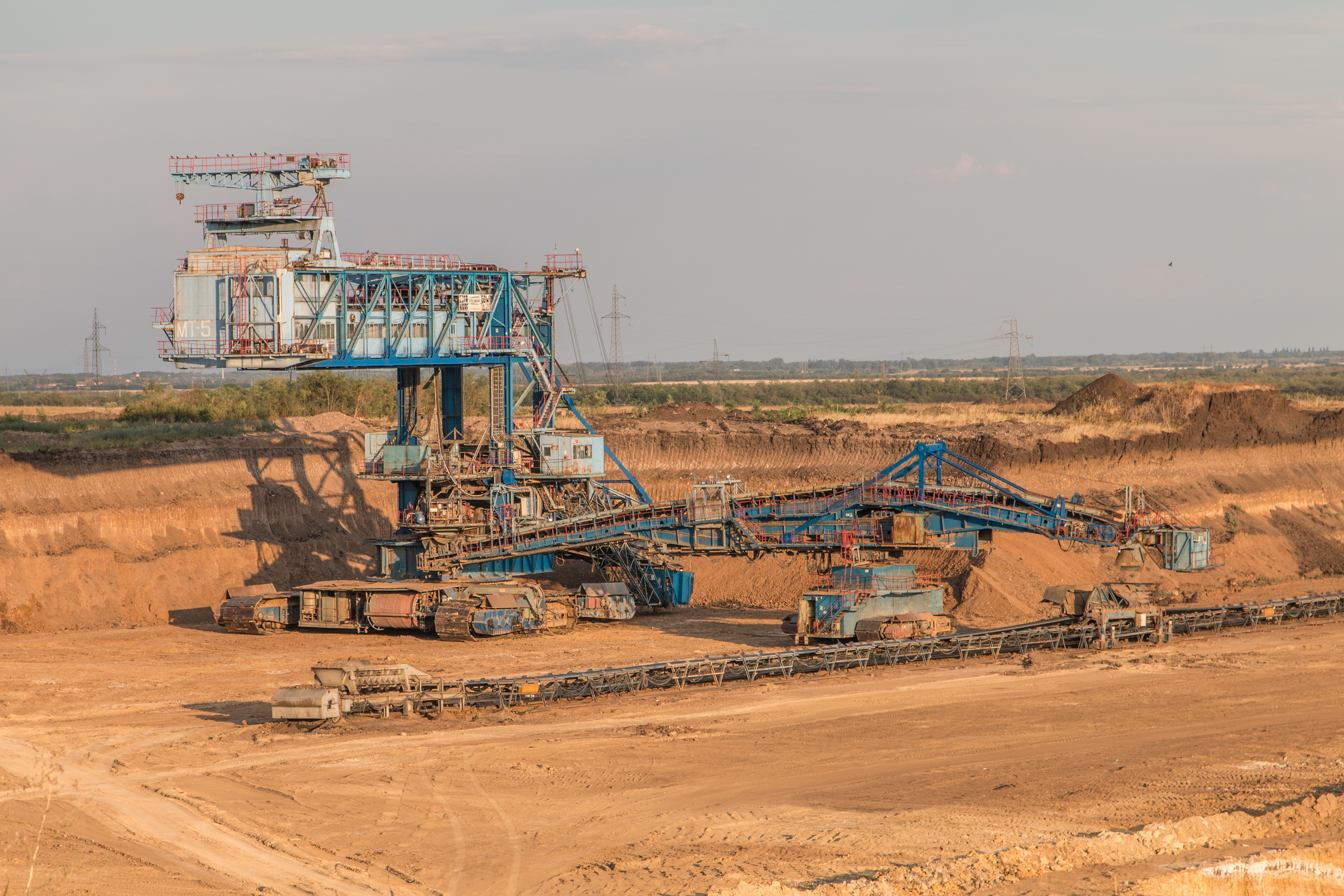
Figure 2-6 Bucket excavator TAKRAF SRs 1200 used for removing sand layers in the East Pit III section, August 2022

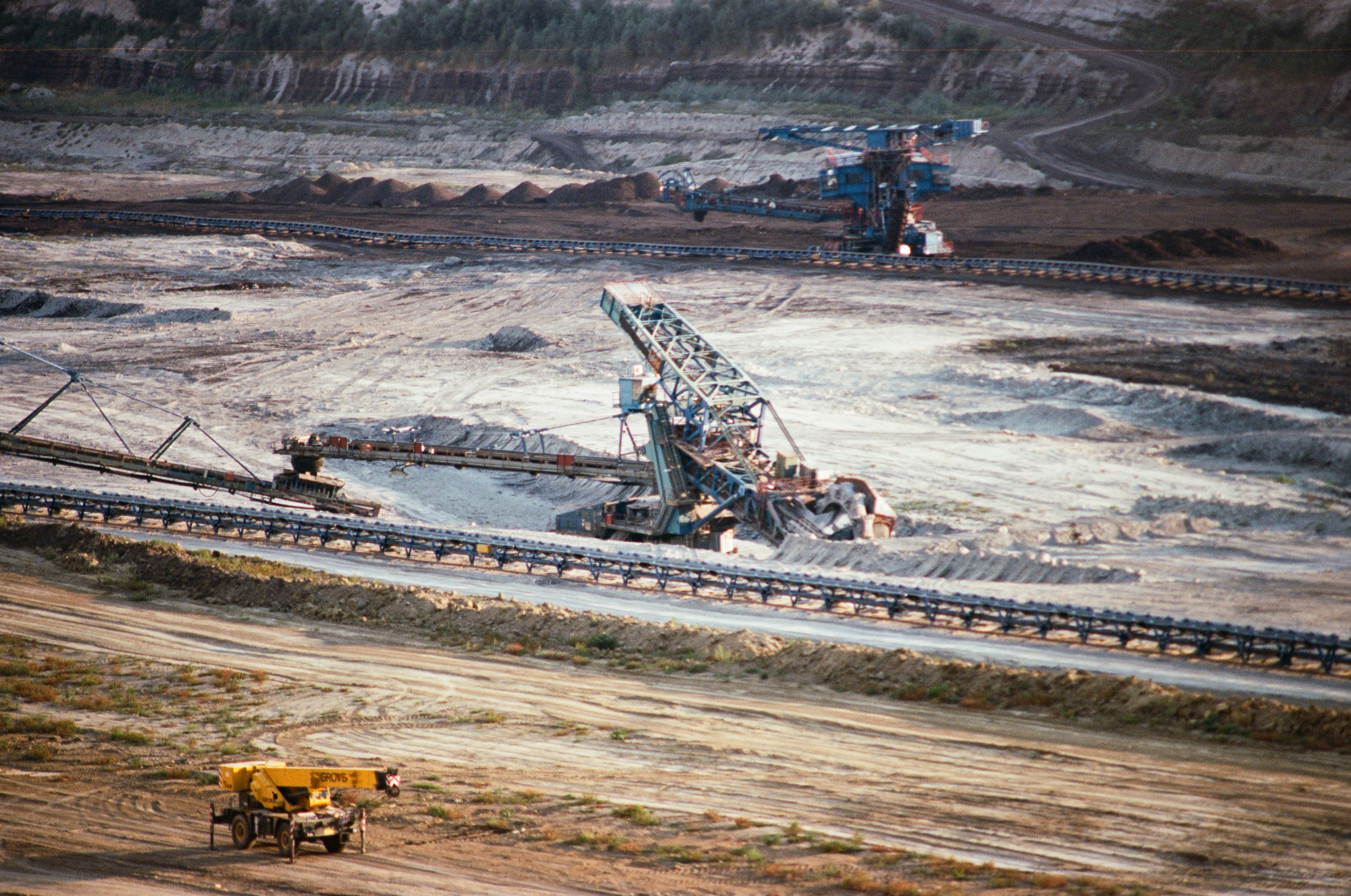
Figure 2–7 Bucket excavator used in the East Pit III section, August 2022

The Visonta Coal Mine is located south of the Mátra in the Gyöngyös District, about 12 km (7 mi) east-southeast of Gyöngyös. The mine has five sections that surround the municipality of Detk. The West Pit is the smallest, and oldest section of the mine, and located north west of Visonta. The regular mining began in the West Pit section in 1969. As of 2022, the West Pit section has been fully recultivated as a step towards the mine's reclamation. East of the West Pit section is the East Pit I section, that borders the Mátra Power Plant in the north, and the municipality of Halmajugra in the south west. As of 2022, the East Pit I section is being recultivated. East of the East Pit I section is the East Pit II section that is bordered by Detk in the south, and the Tarnóca river in the east. As of 2019, the East Pit II section is partially recultivated, but still used for piling overburden with stackers (see fig. 2–5). The combined area of the East Pit I and II sections is 14 km^{2} (5 mi^{2}).

The South Pit section south of Halmajugra has an area of 11.5 km^{2} (4.4 mi^{2}) and is bordered by Detk and Ludas in the east, and Karácsond in the south. The main road 3 is built around the South Pit. As of 2022, the South Pit is being recultivated. The East Pit III section is currently (2022) in operation. It is located east of the East Pit II section. It spans 6 km (4 mi) from west to east, and has a north–south length of 3 km (2 mi) on its west side, and 4 km (2 mi) on its east side. It is bordered to the east by the municipalities of Kófalu, Kápolna and Kompolt.

== History ==
The construction of the Mátra Power Plant began in 1964. Around the same time, the exploitation of the West Pit section with core drillings commenced, which marked the beginning of the industrial open pit coal mining in Hungary. The regular mining began in 1969. The mining equipment was supplied by former East German surface mining equipment manufacturer Takraf. In July 1971, a bucket excavator sustained structural damage, which was believed to be caused by a design flaw. However, the cause for the accident was never found. Between 1979 and 1983, the East Pit II section was prepared for commercial mining by pumping out the groundwater, commercial operating began in 1982. In 1985, the West Pit section was fully exploited; at the same time, the East Pit I section was about two thirds exploited. Originally it was planned to reach an annual production of 8,000,000 t (8,818,490 short tons) by 2000, however, the 1999 annual production was only 3,900,000 t (4,299,014 short tons). In 2005, the East Pit I and II sections were fully exploited. Until 2021, lignite was only mined in the South Pit section. In the mid-2010s, the East Pit III section was prepared for commercial operation; by 2018, it was 70 per cent completed, and by 2021, it was operational. In 2020, a 20 MW_{p} photovoltaic power station was installed in the South Pit section on the overburden.

== Operator ==
The Visonta Coal Mine is operated by Mátrai Erőmű Zrt., a closely held joint-stock company; most of its shares were owned by EP Holding and Lőrinc Mészáros from 2017 until 2020. Since 2020, the power plant has been owned by state-owned MVM Zrt.

== Deposit geology ==
The mine is located in the western section of the eastern Mátraalja coalfield in the Pannonian Basin. It is likely that the Mátraalja coalfield developed in the Pliocene, or possibly even later in the Miocene in a river delta. The layers are mostly composed of grey and greyish blue claystone with partial sandstone layers and lenticular lignite beds. The lignite layers typically have a thickness of 5–14 m (16–46 ft), with other sources stating that the thickness is 5–15 m (16–49 ft).

There are six lignite beds in the region: -II, -I, 0, I, II, and III, with the latter being the deepest bed, and -II being the upmost bed. For economical reasons, only the 0, I, and II beds are mined (as of 2019). In a 2006 survey it was found that the site contained about 308,000,000 t (339,511,884 short tons) of lignite, of which 152,000,000 t (167,551,319 short tons) were deemed economically mineable. Statistically, this amount of lignite will be sufficient for firing the Mátra Power Plant until at least 2108 (data from 2008). German engineer Markus Kosma argues in his 2011 dissertation that the total lignite contained in the site – including the East Pit III section – is 400,000,000 t (440,924,524 short tons).

=== South Pit geology ===
The South Pit section has a 20–30 m (66–98 ft) thick sand layer as its upmost layer, with a 5–15 m (16–49 ft), sometimes up to 30 m (98 ft) thick claystone layer below (see fig. 1-1). The layers containing the -II and -I coal beds have a thickness of 15–25 m (49–82 ft) each, with the coal beds -II and -I being less than 1 m (3 ft) thick. Below these layers, the South Pit section contains a sand layer with a thickness of 15–25 m (49–82 ft). This sand layer has, due to calcium carbonate coagulation from seepage water, several irregularly occurring sandstone sections with a tickness that lies typically in the 0.2–0.3 m (8–12 in) range. About 20 per cent of the sandstone sections are thicker, being 0.3–0.5 m (12–20 in) thick; few layers are even thicker with a thickness of 0.5–1.6 m (20–63 in).

The 0 lignite bed below the sand layers has a thickness of 4.5–6.0 m (15–20 ft), with an average thickness of 5 m (16 ft). It is present in the entire site, except the western part of the South Pit section. Below the 0 lignite bed, the site contains claystone layers. Around 10–15 m (33–49 ft) below the 0 lignite bed, the I lignite bed is present in the entire site. It has a thickness of 1.5–2.5 m (5–8 ft) with an average thickness of 1.9 m (6 ft). It was mined using smaller excavators. The Ia sub-bed below the I lignite bed has a distance of about 3.0–7.0 m (10–23 ft) to the I coal bed, and an average thickness of less than 1 m (3 ft). This makes it uneconomical to mine. However, it was nonetheless mined in sections with a thickness of at least 0.5 m (20 in) using conventional excavators because of its high lower heating value. The II lignite bed below the Ia sub-bed is present in the entire site and has a thickness of 3.0–6.0 m (10–20 ft) with an average thickness of 4.0 m (13 ft).

The total lignite bed thickness of all mineable beds is 10–12 m (33–39 ft). The combined thickness of all sand layers is 60 m (197 ft). The layers have a 0.5 to 2.5° inclination on the south-(east) axis, and no faults. The total depth of the South Pit section was 80 m (262 ft) in the northern part and 130 m (427 ft) in its centre section. In 2011, it contained about 37,000,000 t (40,785,519 short tons) of lignite; the lignite-waste-heap ratio was 7.7:1.

=== East Pit III geology ===
As in the South Pit section, most of the lignite is contained in the 0, I, and II lignite beds. Unlike in the South Pit section, the East Pit III's -II lignite bed is mineable; it contains about 25 per cent of the East Pit III's lignite. The lignite beds are covered by a 20–50 m (66–164 ft) thick sand and claystone layer that contains most of the site's sandstone. The East Pit III is depicted in figures 1-3 and 1–4.

The -II lignite bed is split in a lower and an upper bed; these two beds merge in the eastern part of the East Pit III section, where the thickness of the bed can exceed 9.0 m (30 ft). The thickness of the split beds is, on average, 2.5–3.0 m (8–10 ft) in the upper, and 2.7 m (9 ft) in the lower bed. The upper bed is present in the south east of the East Pit III section, whereas the lower bed is present in the entire East Pit III section. Below the -II bed, there are sand and claystone layers; the thickness of the layers separating the -II and -I beds from the 0 bed is about 15–40 m (49–131 ft). The bottom part of these layers contain sand without sandstone. The 0 bed is also separated into an upper and a lower bed, with non-lignite layers in between. The thickness of these beds is inconsistent; exploratory drilling results indicate that the beds may merge and diverge at several parts of the East Pit III. The merged bed is mostly present in the south and east of the East Pit III section. The thickness of the upper and lower beds is 1.0–2.0 m (3–7 ft) each, with the thickness of the combined bed being about 3.0–7.0 m (10–23 ft).

Below the 0 bed, there is a 10 m (33 ft) thick claystone layer, under which the I and II beds are. The I bed is, just like the 0 and -II beds, split in an upper and a lower bed. The upper bed has a thickness of 1.0–3.0 m (3–10 ft) and is mineable. The 0.5–2.7 m (2–9 ft) thick layer that separates the upper and lower bed does not contain lignite in significant quantities. The lower bed has a thickness of 1.0–1.85 m (3–6 ft). The Ia bed below the I beds has a thickness of less than 1 m (3 ft) and is not mineable, even though its thickness may reach up to 1.5 m (5 ft); the thickest portion is 2.8 m (9 ft) thick. The II bed is about 5–15 m (16–49 ft) below the Ia bed. It also has a small upper bed, and a thick lower bed. The lower bed's thickness is 1.0–4.5 m (3–15 ft); it has a distance of 0.5–9.7 m (2–32 ft) to the upper bed.

The 0, I, and II lignite beds have a combined thickness of 15–20 m (49–66 ft) in the south east part of the East Pit III section, and 30–40 m (98–131 ft) in the west. The layers have a 1.5 to 3.0° inclination on the south-(east) axis, and apparently, no faults. The average depth will be 100–110 m (328–361 ft) in the north, 225 m (738 ft) in the east, 130–180 m (427–591 ft) in the south east, and 160 m (525 ft) in the south west.

== Lignite properties ==
Chemical properties of the lignite found in the Visonta Coal Mine
	According to Kosma (2011)		According to Stoll, Niemann-Delius, Drebenstedt, Müllensiefen (2008)	According to Dovrtel (2003)
	East Pit II	South Pit	Entire mine (excluding East Pit III)	
Water content	49.5 %		46–50 %	50.4%
Ash content	20.0%	16.0%	13–17 %	16–20 %
Sulphur content	1.6%		~1.3 %	0.8%
Lower heating value	6.2 MJ·kg^{−1}	7.2 MJ·kg^{−1}	6.9–7.2 MJ·kg^{−1}	7.1–7.2 MJ·kg^{−1}
Source				

The mined lignite is earthy-brown, wooden soft brown coal of low quality. The average lower heating value is only 7.1 MJ/kg (3,052 BTU/lb). This is only one third of the lower heating value of the lignite found in West Hungary near Tatabánya.

== Mining technique ==
Since 2006, swivel mining in combination with a conveyor belt overburden transport system has been used. The mining is conducted in clockwise direction. Many mining machines used in the Visonta Coal Mine were made by Takraf in former East Germany. In total, five bucket excavators (see figures 2-1, 2–6, and 2–7) are used to remove the sand layers covering the lignite beds. These bucket excavators can each move about 30,000–42,000 m^{3} (39,000–55,000 yd^{3}) of overburden everyday. The conveyor belt transport system (see fig. 2-2) has a total length of 44 km (27 mi). Its 1,600 mm (63 in) wide belts move at a speed of 5.5–5.8 m/s (18–19 ft/s) and can move about 50,000–60,000 m^{3} (65,000–78,000 yd^{3}) of overburden everyday. In total, six stackers (see fig. 2–3) are used to pile the overburden; one bucket excavator and one stacker have been, since 1972, directly connected in a "direct piling combination" of the SRsh type that was developed by Takraf for the Visonta Coal Mine in the late 1960s. The ARsh 5200.165 stacker has a 165 m (541 ft) long stacking arm and a horizontal alignment system that allows it to climb 1:10 inclines without tipping over.

The sandstone layers above the 0 bed is mined by contractors using conventional excavators and offroad lorries in a so-called shovel-and-truck operation. The same technique is also used by contractors to mine lignite where using bucket dredgers is unfeasible. Most of the lignite that is mined using this technique is transported onto the II lignite bed where it is eventually mined with a bucket dredger. Most of the lignite (90 per cent) is thus mined with bucket dredgers. In total, three bucket dredgers (see fig. 2–4) with benches are used, which can each excavate 14,000 m^{3} (18,300 yd^{3}) of lignite everyday.

The Visonta Coal Mine's workers work in a 24/7/365 shift system with three eight hour shifts everyday. Sunday is a regular work day. In 2009, Mátrai Erőmű Zrt. had 917 employees who worked in the Visonta Coal Mine. In 2010, 35,500,000 m^{3} (46,430,000 yd^{3}) of overburden were moved with bucket excavators, and 3,400,000 m^{3} (4,450,000 yd^{3}) of overburden were moved using regular excavators. The bucket dredgers excavated 3,600,000 t (3,970,000 short tons) of lignite, including most of the 500,000 t (550,000 short tons) lignite excavated with recular excavators.

== Lignite usage ==
The lignite is used as a fuel for the Mátra Power Plant in Visonta (see fig. 3–1) that is located about 5 km (3 mi) north of the South Pit section. The Mátra Power Plant is a combined lignite-natural-gas-biomass power plant with a power output of 0.95 GW. It generates about 13 per cent of the electric power of Hungary, which makes it the biggest fossile fuel power plant in Hungary. It was synchronised with the power grid on 19 June 1969. Originally, the plant had a power output of 0.8 GW with two 100 MW generators and three 200 MW generators that were built between 1969 and 1972. From 1986 until 1992, the plant was modernised and had its three 200 MW turbines replaced with more efficient units. From 1998 until 2000, a FGD system was installed for the 200 MW units to improve the exhaust gas quality, and the power output of the 200 MW turbines was increased by 10 and 16 per cent. By 2003, the 100 MW units' FGD systems were also completed.

In 2007, two 33 MW gas turbines were installed that run on natural gas. About 10 per cent of the solid fuel burnt in the Mátra Power Plant is biomass (in 2019). From 2015 until 2017, the 200 MW turbines were modernised once more; the gas turbines were modernised in 2019. The plant's primary fuel will be lignite until 2025 (as of 2021); originally, it was planned to use lignite at least until 2030. After the MVM purchase in 2020, it was decided to convert the plant into a mostly natural gas-fired plant because of the aging equipment and the high carbon dioxide emissions caused by using lignite as fuel; the Mátrai Power Plant produces about 14 per cent of the annual Hungarian carbon dioxide emissions. It is said that a 500 MW natural gas turbine will be put into operation in 2025. It will be assisted by the photovoltaic power plant in the former South Pit section. The resources extracted from the plant's exhaust gasses are used to manufacture plasterboard and cement.

The Mátrai Power Plant is an important economical factor for the Gyöngyös region. In the 2008 fiscal year, Mátrai Erőmű Zrt. had a revenue of 86.9 bio. Ft. The industrial estate surrounding the power plant had 1871 employees (in 2008), and generated a revenue of 37.7 bio. Ft.

== Environmental impact ==
The pumping out of the groundwater affects the groundwater levels of the municipalities of Visonta, Halmajugra, Detk, Karácsond, Nagyfüged, Nagyút, Tarnazsadány, Tarnabod, Kompolt, Kápolna, Tófalu and Aldebrí, which damages buildings in these municipalities. Mátrai Erőmű Zrt. pays compensation for severe damage caused by mining.
