= Felsőzsolca Solar Park =

Photovoltaic power station in Hungary

- Country: Hungary
- Location: Felsőzsolca
- Coordinates: 48°06′00″N 20°53′00″E
- Status: Completed
- Commission date: 2018
- Construction cost: 9 billion Ft
- Owner: MVM Group

Solar farm
- Type: Flat-panel PV

Power generation
- Units operational: 74,000
- Nameplate capacity: 20 MW
- Annual net output: 45 GWh

Felsőzsolca Solar Park is a large thin-film photovoltaic (PV) power system, built on a 45 ha (110 acres) plot of land located in Felsőzsolca in Hungary. The solar park has around 74,000 state-of-the-art thin film PV panels for a total nameplate capacity of 20-megawatts, and was finished in November 2018. The solar park is expected to supply around 63 GWh of electricity per year enough to power some 10,000 average homes.

The installation is located in the Borsod-Abaúj-Zemplén County in north-eastern Hungary near Felsőzsolca. The investment cost for the Felsőzsolca solar park amounts to some 9 billion Hungarian forint.

This is the largest photovoltaics producing plant in Hungary and the largest in Northern Hungary. (until 2019)

== See also ==
- Energy policy of the European Union
- Photovoltaics
- Renewable energy commercialization
- Renewable energy in the European Union
- Solar power in Hungary
