= Dunai =

Dunai may refer to:

== Places ==
- Dunai, Nepal, the headquarter of Dolpa District
- Dunai Solar Park, photovoltaic power system in Százhalombatta in Hungary
- An alternative spelling of Dunay, Primorsky Krai

== Technology ==
- Dunai radar, a system of two Soviet radars
- P-19 radar, a 2D UHF radar

== People ==
- Antal Dunai (born 1943)
- Ede Dunai (born 1949), Hungarian footballer
- János Dunai (1937–2025), Hungarian footballer
- Lajos Dunai (1942–2000), Hungarian footballer
- Tamás Dunai (1949–2023), Hungarian actor
