= Mátra Power Plant =

Lignite-fired power plant in Hungary

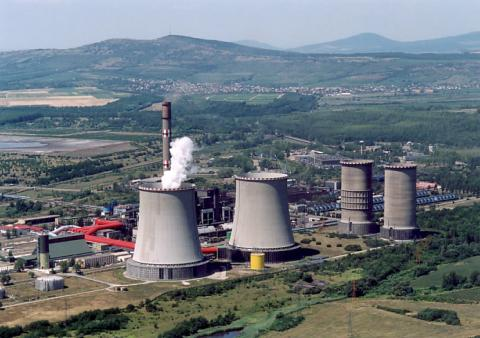
- Location in Hungary
- Country: Hungary
- Location: Visonta, Heves County
- Coordinates: 47°47′25″N 20°3′45″E
- Status: Operational
- Construction began: 1965
- Commission date: 1969
- Owner: MVM Group
- Operator: Mátrai Erőmű Zrt.

Thermal power station
- Primary fuel: Lignite
- Secondary fuel: Natural gas, biomass

Power generation
- Units operational: 950 MW: 2 × 100 MW Lignite; 1 × 212 MW Lignite; 2 × 220 MW Lignite; 2 × 33 MW Gas
- Nameplate capacity: 950 MW

External links
- Website: mert.mvm.hu
- Commons: Related media on Commons

Mátra Power Plant (Hungarian: Mátrai Erőmű), is a lignite fired power plant majority owned by MVM, the Hungarian state owned power company since 2019. It is located in the valley of the Mátra mountains, in Hungary. It has an installed electric power output of 950 MW, however, one 200 MW generator has been on permanent hiatus since January 2021. According to the government energy strategy announced in 2021, most of the existing lignite-fuelled units would be shut down in 2025, and a new 500 MW gas-fired unit would be added as well as up to 400 MW in solar power. Due to the energy crisis in 2022, the switch to natural gas was delayed to 2028 or 2029.

The major coal units of the plant were the largest electricity producers after Paks Nuclear Power Plant in 2014 (and before), with a market share of more than 20%. This changed to around 7% of the country's electricity production in 2023, and to only 3% in 2025. Mátra Power Plant is also a minor producer of electricity from its natural gas based power units accounting for around 1% of domestic electricity production.

The plant was once considered an important pillar in the national energy sector because it burns domestic fuel (lignite), unlike most other electricity plants in Hungary. However, the owner of the plant – the government – decided that the current lignite and gas based power generating unit is to be shut down by 2029 due to the aging generating equipment, the low quality of the local lignite, and the resulting environmental problems as well as the high emission costs. In 2018, Mátra Power Plant produced approximately 7.9 million (metric) tonnes of lignite but that decreased to a little under 5 million (metric) tonnes by 2021 according to the company's website. According to the Hungarian Energy Office, total lignite production of Hungary in 2025 was 2.05 million tonnes (this includes smaller mines producing not more 0.1 million tonnes combined). This means that Mátra Energy company mined around 2 Million tonnes or slightly less in 2025. Power production from coal has decreased to 1,270GWh or 3.2% of total electricity produced in 2025.

== History up to 2010 ==
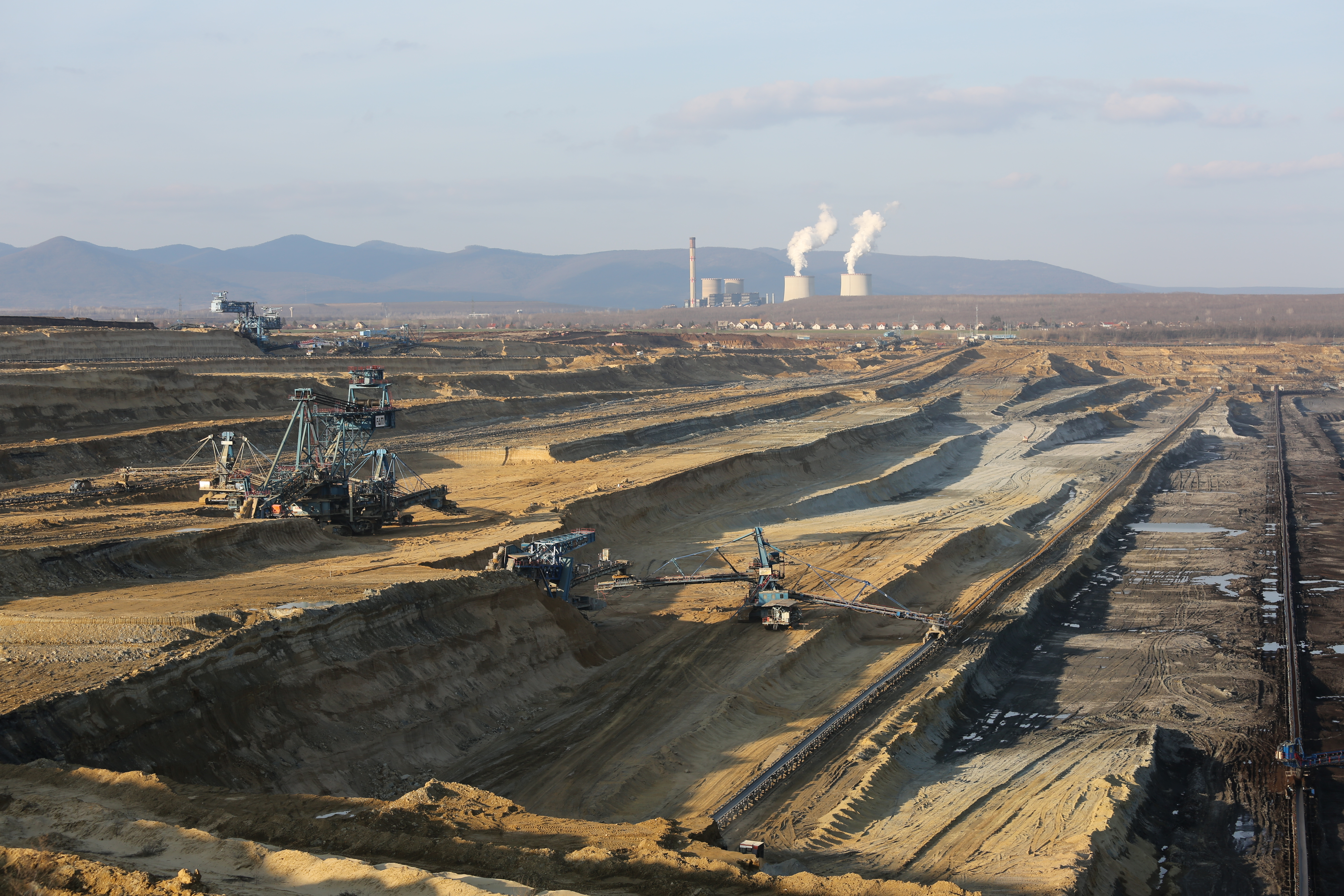
The South Pit of the Visonta coal mine in 2013

The power plant has been operating for more than 50 years – since 1969. The lignite is extracted from the opencast mines in Visonta and Bükkábrány. The original construction project was started in 1965, when a lignite field was discovered near Gyöngyös. Between 1986 and 1992, the plant was first modernized. The company was then privatized and, subsequently, a controlling interest was acquired by RWE in 1995. The entire power station required an upgrade and retrofit program. As it emitted high levels of sulfur, flue-gas desulphurisation units were equipped to comply with EU emission standards. The units introduced were the first of their kind in the region, making the plant one of the most environmentally friendly coal-fired power plants in Europe.

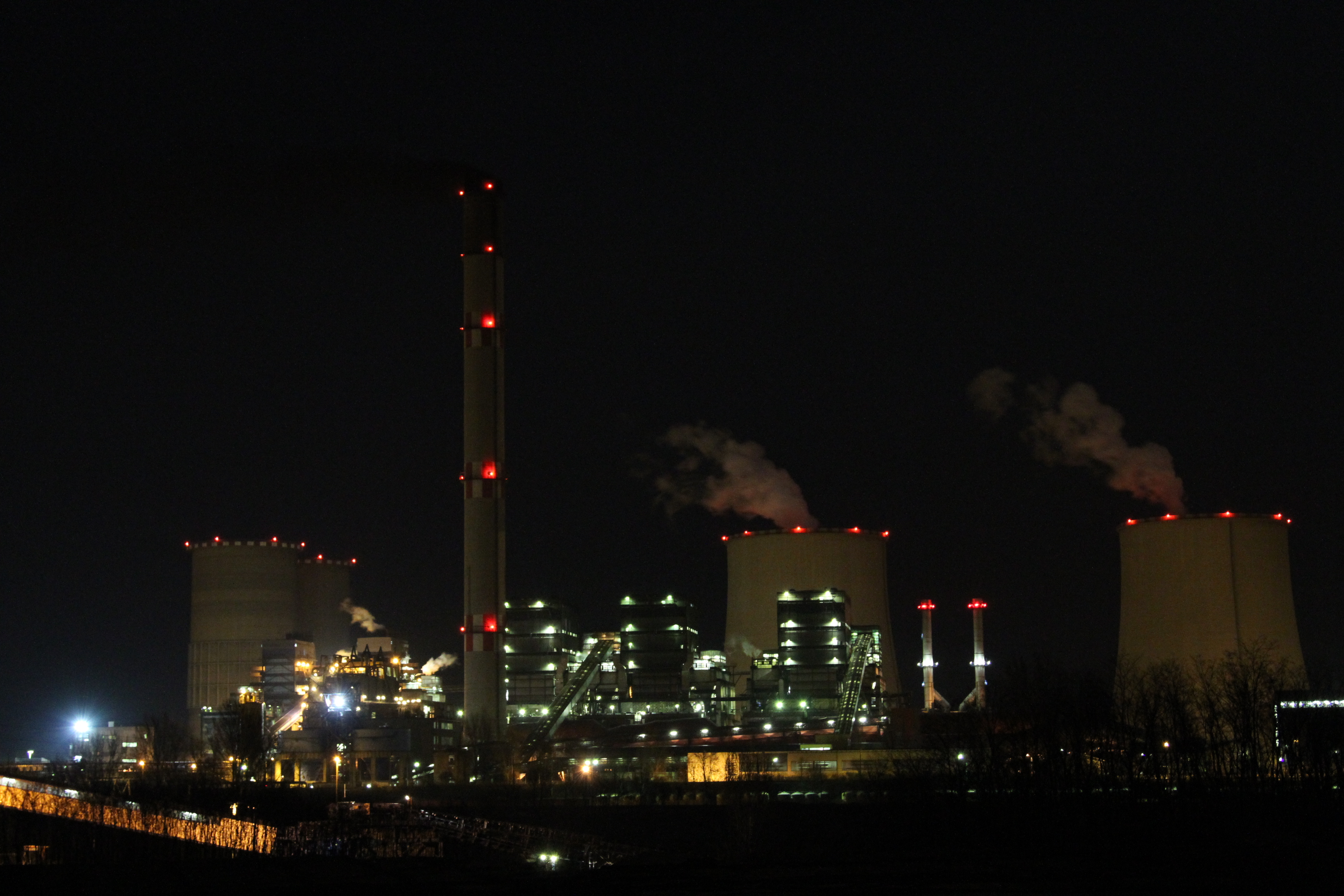
Matra Power Plant at night

Between 2005 and 2007, two of the 200 MW units were equipped with two topping gas turbines (TBT), each with a maximum power output of 33 MW, which improved efficiency. The performance of the coal block was increased by about 10%, which accounts for a total power output increase of about 100 MW. There were also plans for an additional block to be built, but in late 2010, the project was cancelled.

The chimney with a height of 203 meters is the 8th tallest buildings in Hungary.
