= Pécs Solar Park =

Photovoltaic power station in Hungary

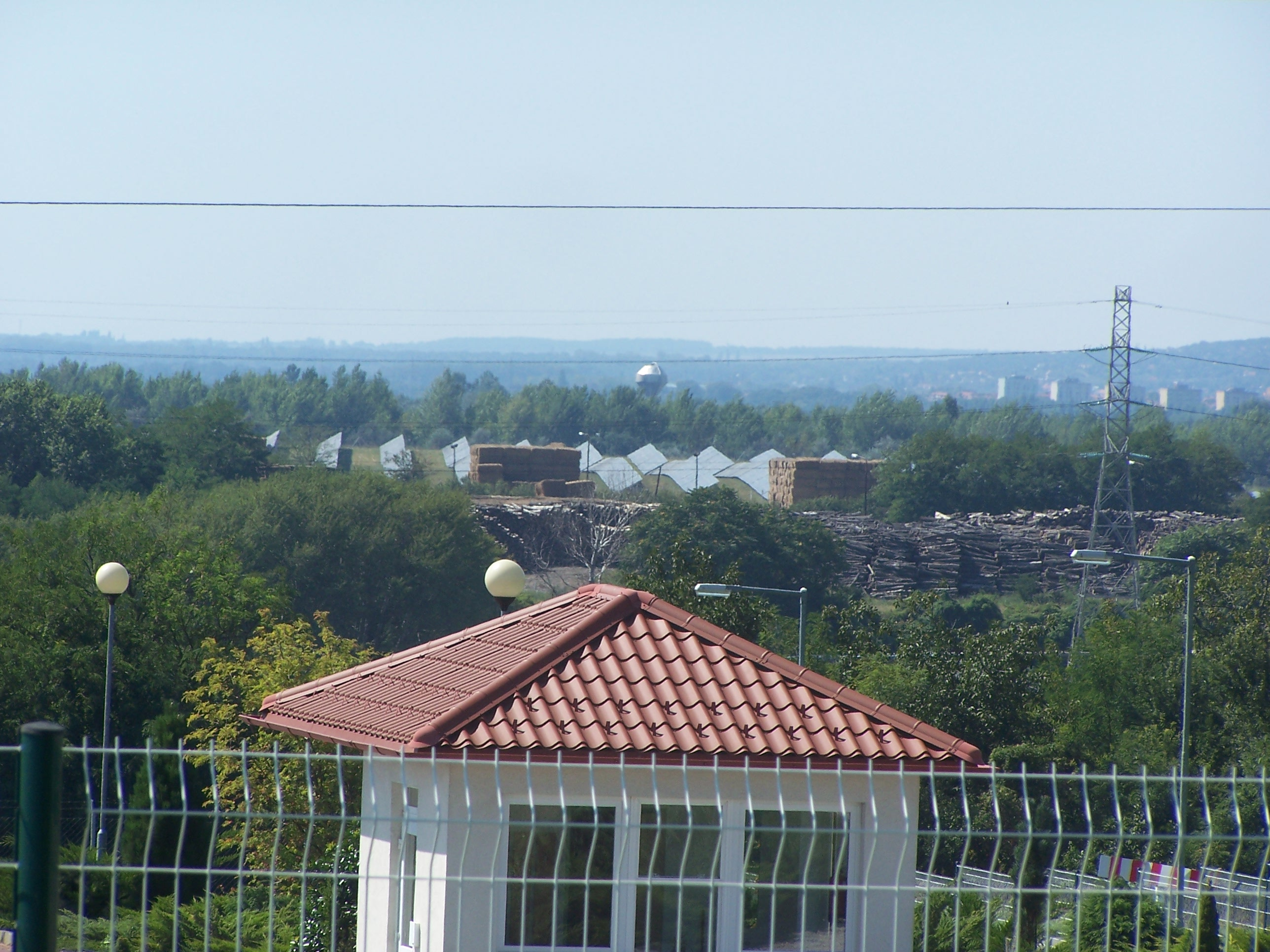
- The solar park seen from the east
- Country: Hungary
- Location: Pécs
- Coordinates: 46°03′35″N 18°15′27″E
- Status: Completed
- Commission date: 2016
- Construction cost: 4.2 billion Ft
- Owner: MVM Group

Solar farm
- Type: Flat-panel PV

Power generation
- Units operational: 38,000
- Nameplate capacity: 10 MW

Pécs Solar Park is a large thin-film photovoltaic (PV) power system, built on a 20 ha (49 acres) plot of land located in Pécs in Hungary. The solar park has around 38,000 state-of-the-art thin film PV panels for a total nameplate capacity of 20-megawatts, and was finished in April 2016. The solar park is expected to supply around 63 GWh of electricity per year enough to power some 10,000 average homes.

The installation is located in the Baranya County in south-western Hungary near Pécs-Tüskésrét. The investment cost for the Pécs solar park amounts to some 4.2 billion Hungarian forint.

This is the fourth largest photovoltaics producing plant in Hungary and the largest in Southern Transdanubia. (until 2019)

== See also ==
- Energy policy of the European Union
- Photovoltaics
- Renewable energy commercialization
- Renewable energy in the European Union
- Solar power in Hungary
