= Bükkábrány coal mine =

Coal mine in Bükkábrány, Borsod-Abaúj-Zemplén County, Hungary

Bükkábrány Coal Mine
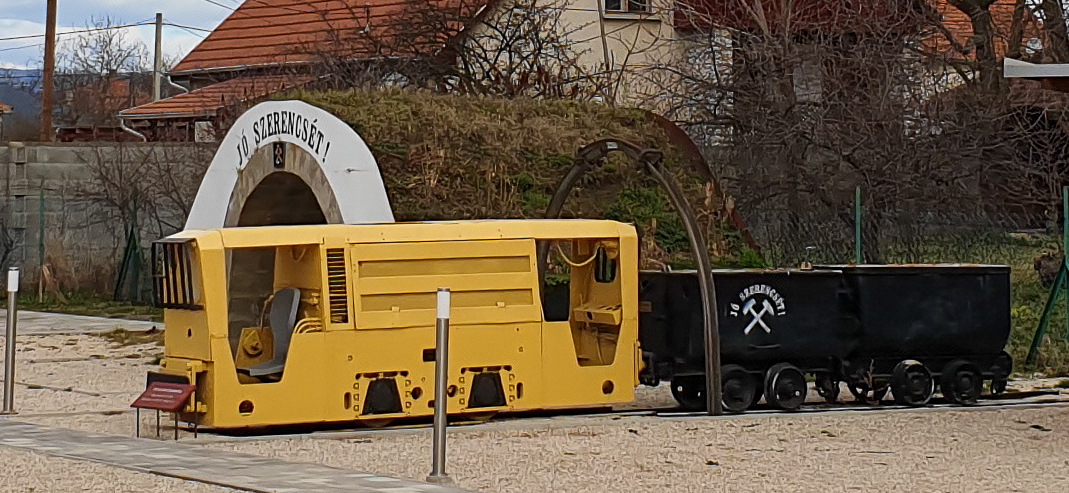
- Mining exhibition in Bükkábrány

Location
- Location: Bükkábrány, Borsod-Abaúj-Zemplén County, Hungary

Production
- Products: Lignite

The Bükkábrány Coal Mine is a coal mine located in Bükkábrány, Borsod-Abaúj-Zemplén County, Hungary. The mine has coal reserves amounting to 400 million tonnes of lignite, one of the largest coal reserves in Europe and the world and had an annual production of 3.5 million tonnes of coal in the early 2010s.
