= Bükkábrány mummified forest =

Preserved but non-fossilized Swamp Cypresses in Hungary

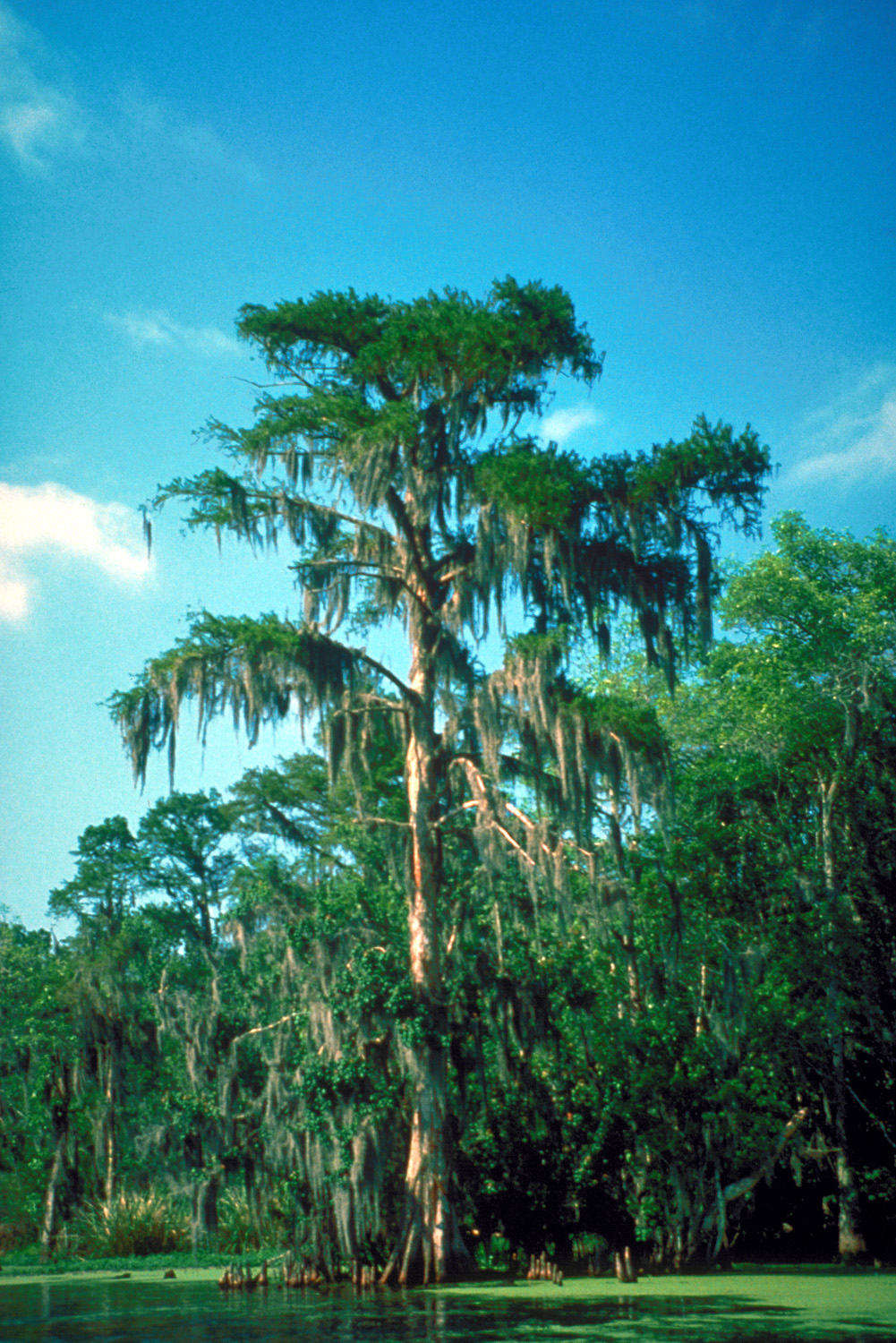
Taxodium distichum, a modern American relative of the preserved ancient trees

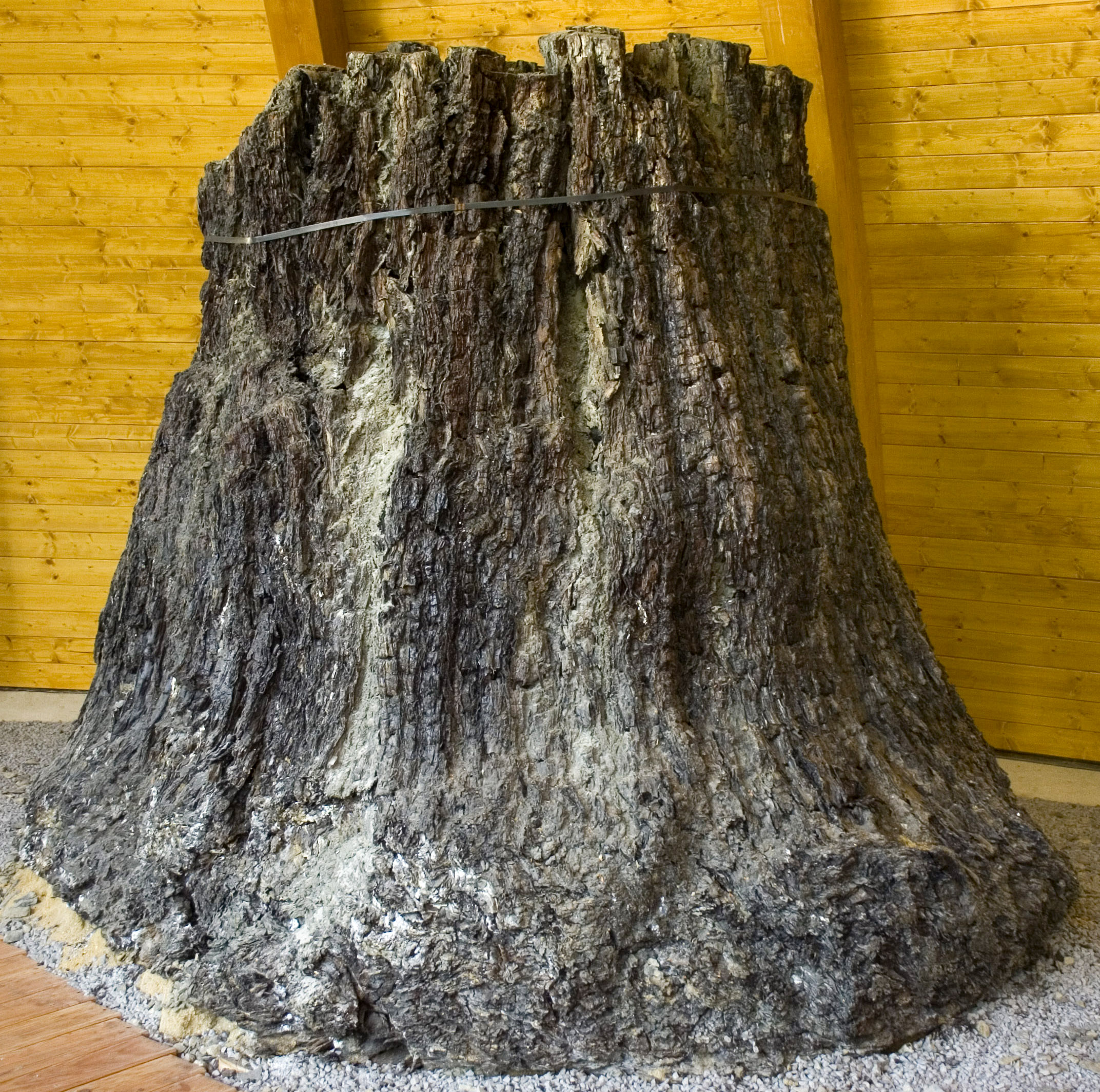
One of the trees exhibited at Ipolytarnóc. Its height is ca. 3 m

The Bükkábrány mummified forest is a 2007 paleontological discovery in northeastern Hungary of sixteen well-preserved swamp cypress (Taxodium) trunks of Miocene age which were found in an open pit lignite mine 60 meters underground near the town of Bükkábrány. The trunks, about six metres high and two to three metres in diameter, were cased in sand about eight million years ago, preserving their wood without fossilization. The find is unique in Europe, since trees this old have never been found in their original state and original place before.

The cypresses were 30 to 40 meters high and 300 to 400 years old when they died during the Miocene period, when this region was partially covered by the shallow Pannonian Sea with marshy shorelines creating habitat for swamp cypresses. The trees were covered by a sandstorm up to 6 meters high, and their trunks remained intact.

Because of the non-fossilized state of the trees, dendrochronology tests can be done, and scientists can gain insight into the climate changes of the period when the trees lived. Their non-fossilized state also makes the trees very vulnerable to external conditions such as air and sunlight, so it was with precautions and the strictest security measures that the cypresses were transported, four to the Ottó Herman Museum in county seat Miskolc in northeast Hungary on August 8, 2007, and the rest to the visitor's centre of the Bükk National Park in Ipolytarnóc. During transportation, the trees were drenched with water to keep them moist. Not all of the trunks can likely be preserved since some of them have already decayed, and only their shucks remain, filled with sand.

The preservation process can last up to 4 years and will cost about 200 million forints (800,000 euros).
