= Balatonszentgyörgy =

- Village
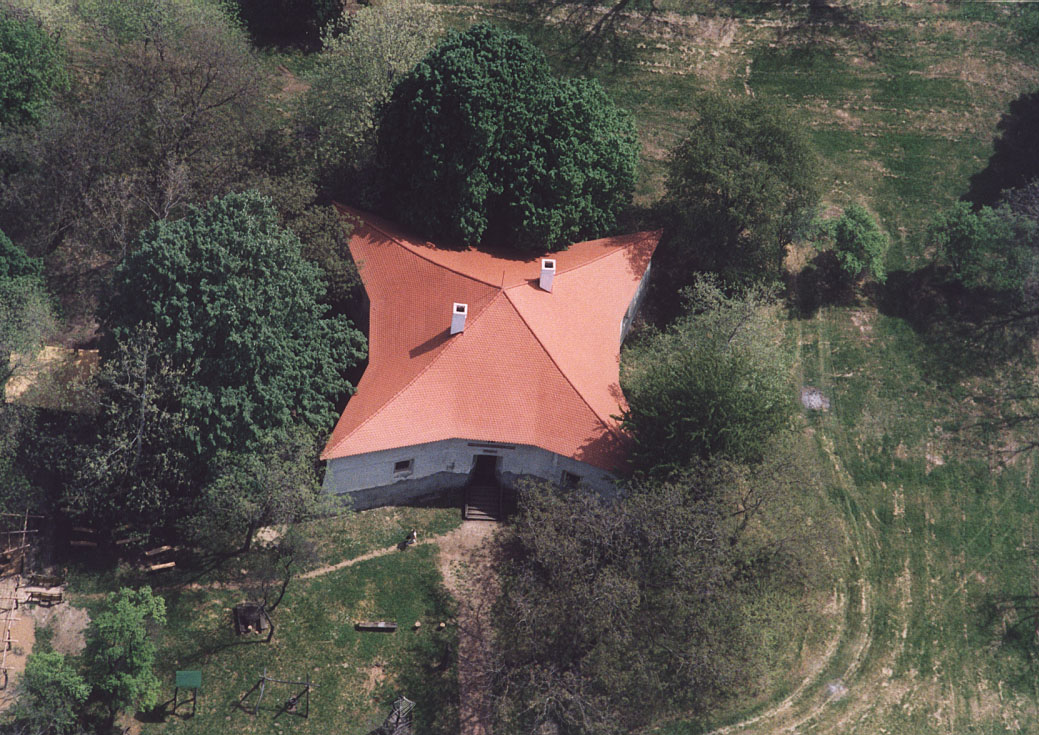
- Csillagvár (English: star castle)

- Coat of arms

- Location of Balatonszentgyörgy
- Coordinates: 46.68852°N 17.29528°E
- Country: Hungary
- Region: Southern Transdanubia
- County: Somogy
- District: Marcali
- RC Diocese: Kaposvár

Area
  - Total: 23.68 km^{2} (9.14 sq mi)

Population (2017)
  - Total: 1,569
  - Density: 66.26/km^{2} (171.6/sq mi)
- Demonym(s): szentgyörgyi, balatonszentgyörgyi
- Time zone: UTC+1 (CET)
  - Summer (DST): UTC+2 (CEST)
- Postal code: 8710
- Area code: (+36) 85
- Patron Saint: George of Lydda
- Motorways: M7
- Distance from Budapest: 175 km (109 mi) Northeast
- NUTS 3 code: HU232
- MP: József Attila Móring (KDNP)
- Website: Balatonszentgyörgy Online

Balatonszentgyörgy is a village in Somogy county, Hungary. It is near to the village of Balatonberény. The village is next to Lake Balaton.

== Etymology ==
The village got its name after Saint George (Hungarian: Szent György), the patron of its church.

== Geography ==
Csücskénél-Balatonszentgyörgy is located in the Southwest of Lake Balaton, the Zala River and the 7. sz. Főközlekedési road, by a small Lake that is on the conservation area's boundary. The village is located on the southern shore of Lake Balaton by the Somogy County-gate.

There is a panorama of the Hill at Somosi, from the Víztükre Lake shores. A forest and conservation region lies to the west of the village, local hills are to the east and Lake Balaton a short way to the north.

== History ==
During Roman time there was evidence that the lake side at Balatonszentgyörgy was an ancient crossing point to the village of Balaton Fenékpuszta across Lake Balaton.

The town's Court in 1454 was an Italian Gordovai, Mr Fanchi László of the Szentgyörgyi family and was allowed to pass local laws. In 1480, the hamlets of Szentgyörggyel, Keszi, Bottyán Oszlár and Ságfalu merged South-East towards int to Kéthely. The Ottoman Empire invaded the village in 1566.

The Hungarian Revolution of 1848, did not reach the village, but a cholera outbreak hit the area around the village. The village doctor and the school were set up in 1904.

According to László Szita the settlement was completely Hungarian in the 18th century.

33 locals had died in World War I.

In the run-up to the Hungarian Front during World War II, Nazi German troops entered in the village. There is a German cemetery of 116 dead troopers behind the station. It was used as a heavy artillery positions. The rails and the Zala River's border-bridges were blown up as the Germans left in 1945. A statue commemorates the 47 local who died in the war.

In 1948, the village was given its first electric lighting system. On 22 October 1950 was founded within the Municipal Council and a local agricultural co-operative was founded in 1959 under the name Csillagvár, and then established the present day battyánpusztai.

== Castles ==
The Star Castle (known locally as the Csillagvár) lies at the border with the settlement of Balatonberény. The star-shaped, fortress-like building was constructed by László Festetics during the 1820s as a hunting lodge and an exhibition inside the building introduces the life of knights of border castles in the 16th century. There is a waxwork museum in the Star castle.

== Churches ==
A little further down the valley are the houses of the Roman Catholic Church by the Székesfehérvár-Nagykanizsa-Budapest railway line. From here starts the village of Balatonszentgyörgy, on the Keszthely – Town-Somogyszob-Balatonszentgyörgy-and the railway line. A new church was erected between 1925, and 1928. The Churches are of Roman Catholic faith.

== Transport ==
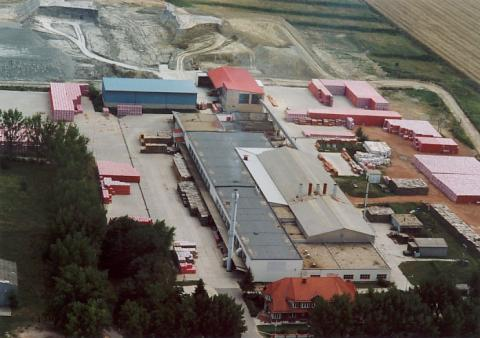
A factory in Balatonszentgyörgy

The main road comes from the direction of Budapest-nagykanizsai. A bicycle route and road alsorun from Balatonszentgyörgy to Balatonbereny. Balatonszentgyörgy is on the Keszthely – Town-Somogyszob-Balatonszentgyörgy-and the railway line. There is also a railway to Budapest and Balatonberény. The construction of the station began in 1858, and completed in 1861. The station name: station was" Keszthely External" back then and became the hub of the századfordulóra railway Balatonszentgyörgy. The station has 1 island platform.

== Demographics ==
The population increased from 1,162 and the number of houses was 116 in late Victorian times. In 1932, the municipality has a population of 1,440 people in 223 house. the population stood at 1,659 in 2004. Its village area is 23,68 km^{2} with 1,610 inhabitants within it during 2009.
