= Detk =

- Village (község)
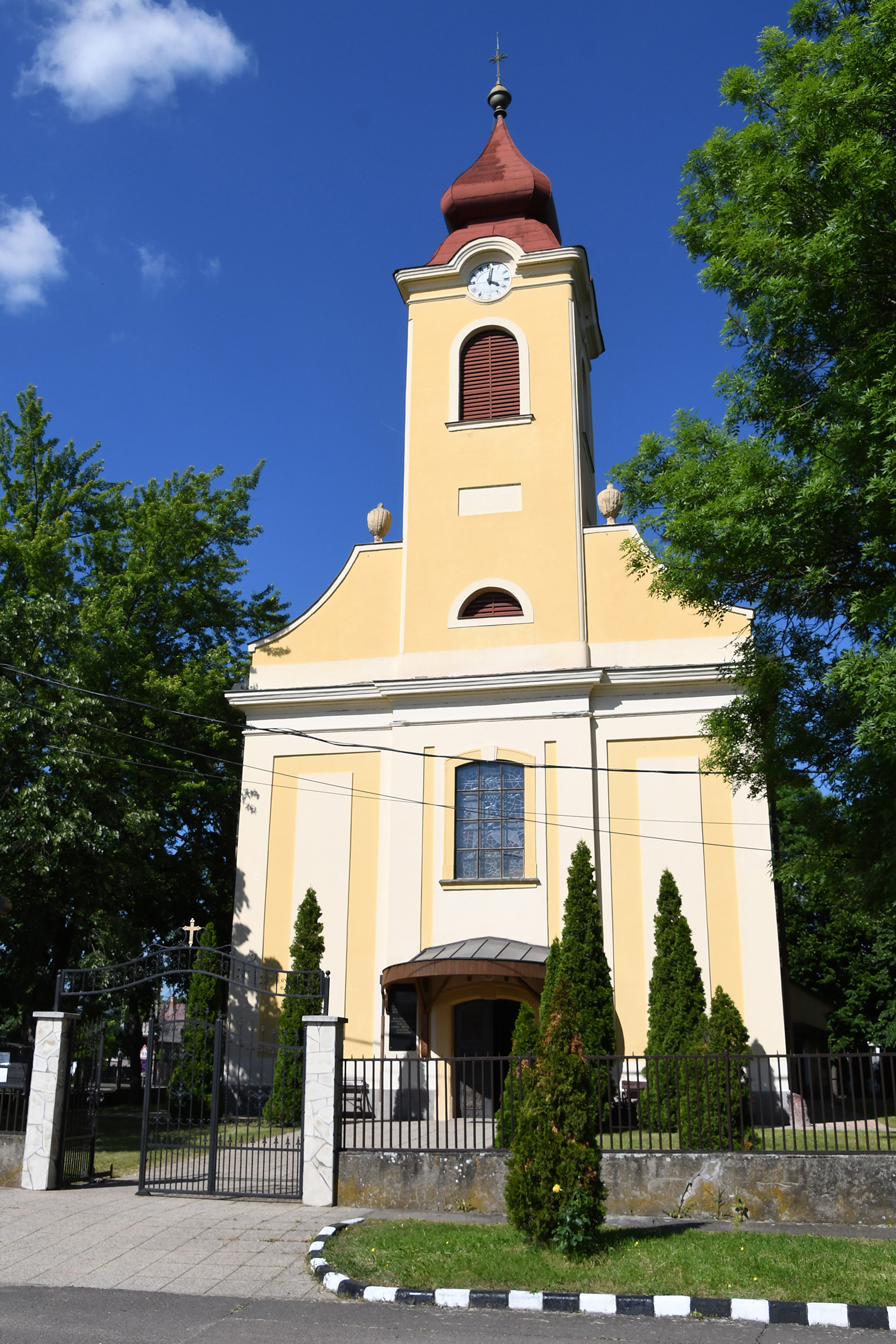
- Roman Catholic church in Detk

- Coat of arms

- Location of Heves County in Hungary

- Location in Hungary
- Coordinates: 47°44′50.91″N 20°05′57.20″E
- Country: Hungary
- Region: Northern Hungary
- County: Heves County
- District: Gyöngyös

Government
  - Mayor: Tamás Stefanovszki (Ind.)

Area
  - Total: 28.08 km^{2} (10.84 sq mi)

Population (2015)
  - Total: 1,165
  - Density: 41.49/km^{2} (107.5/sq mi)
- Time zone: UTC+1 (CET)
  - Summer (DST): UTC+2 (CEST)
- Postal code: 3275
- Area code: 37
- Website: www.detk.hu

Detk is a village (population 1,210 (2008 (est.)) in Heves county in Hungary, situated near Gyöngyös on the north-western edge of the Great Hungarian Plain. The landscape to the north and west of the village is scarred by Mátrai Erőmű's large open-cast lignite mine. The village is most famous for its biscuit company, Detki Keksz Kft., whose factory is located in the neighbouring village of Halmajugra.

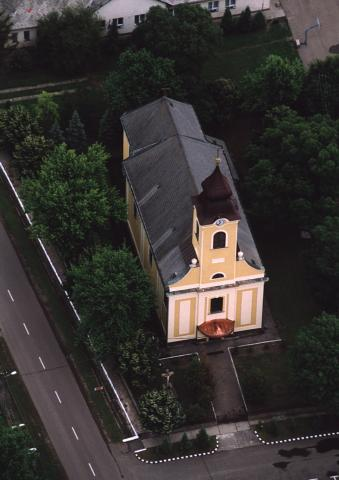
Aerial view
