= Dunai Solar Park =

Photovoltaic power station in Hungary

- Country: Hungary
- Location: Százhalombatta
- Coordinates: 47°20′00″N 18°54′00″E
- Status: Completed
- Commission date: 2018
- Construction cost: €25 million
- Owner: MET Power

Solar farm
- Type: Flat-panel PV

Power generation
- Units operational: 76,000
- Nameplate capacity: 17.6 MW
- Annual net output: 25 GWh

Dunai (Százhalombatta) Solar Park is a large thin-film photovoltaic (PV) power system, built on a 40 ha (99 acres) plot of land located in Százhalombatta in Hungary. The solar park has around 76,000 state-of-the-art thin film PV panels for a total nameplate capacity of 17.6-megawatts, and was finished in October 2018. The solar park is expected to supply around 63 GWh of electricity per year enough to power some 9,000 average homes.

The installation is located in the Pest County in central Hungary near Százhalombatta. The investment cost for the Dunai solar park amounts to some Euro 25 million.

This is the second largest photovoltaics producing plant in Hungary and the largest in Central Hungary. (until 2019)

== See also ==
- Energy policy of the European Union
- Photovoltaics
- Renewable energy commercialization
- Renewable energy in the European Union
- Solar power in Hungary
