= Balatonberény =

- Village
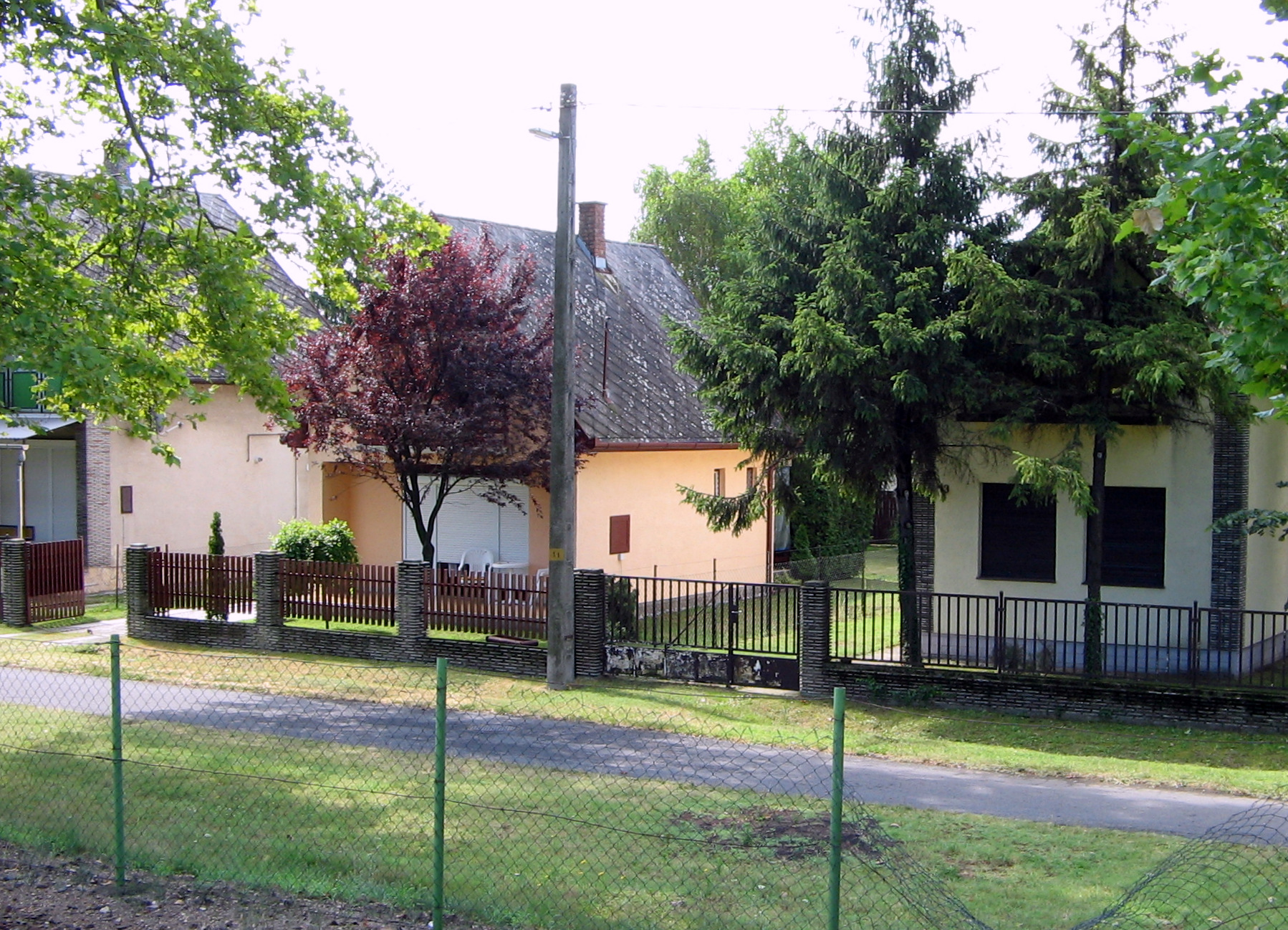
- Bungalows in the village

- Coat of arms

- Location of Balatonberény
- Coordinates: 46.70679°N 17.32095°E
- Country: Hungary
- Region: Southern Transdanubia
- County: Somogy
- District: Marcali
- RC Diocese: Kaposvár

Area
  - Total: 26.09 km^{2} (10.07 sq mi)

Population (2017)
  - Total: 1,102
  - Density: 42.24/km^{2} (109.4/sq mi)
- Demonym(s): berényi, balatonberényi
- Time zone: UTC+1 (CET)
  - Summer (DST): UTC+2 (CEST)
- Postal code: 8649
- Area code: (+36) 85
- Patron Saint: John the Baptist
- Motorways: M7
- Distance from Budapest: 177 km (110 mi) Northeast
- NUTS 3 code: HU232
- MP: József Attila Móring (KDNP)
- Website: Balatonberény Online

Balatonberény is a village in Somogy county, Hungary, with a popular nudist beach. The village had a population of 1,200 in 2011.

The settlement is part of the Balatonboglár wine region.

== History ==
=== General history ===
A late Bronze Age cemetery has been found near the town.

Many of inhabitants escaped to the reed-woods of Small Balaton (Kis-Balaton) close to the village and Lake Balaton when the Ottoman Empire conquered the village.

By 1733 the Hunyady family had become the largest landlord in the area.

=== Churches ===
The town's first recorded church owned lands was noted in 1332. The Roman Catholic church was built around 1350 and it got seriously damaged during the Ottoman invasion.

=== Castles ===
The Star Castle (known locally as the Csillagvár) lies at the border with the settlement of Balatonszentgyörgy. The star-shaped, fortress-like building was constructed by László Festetics during the 1820s as a hunting lodge and an exhibition inside the building introduces the life of knights of border castles in the 16th century.

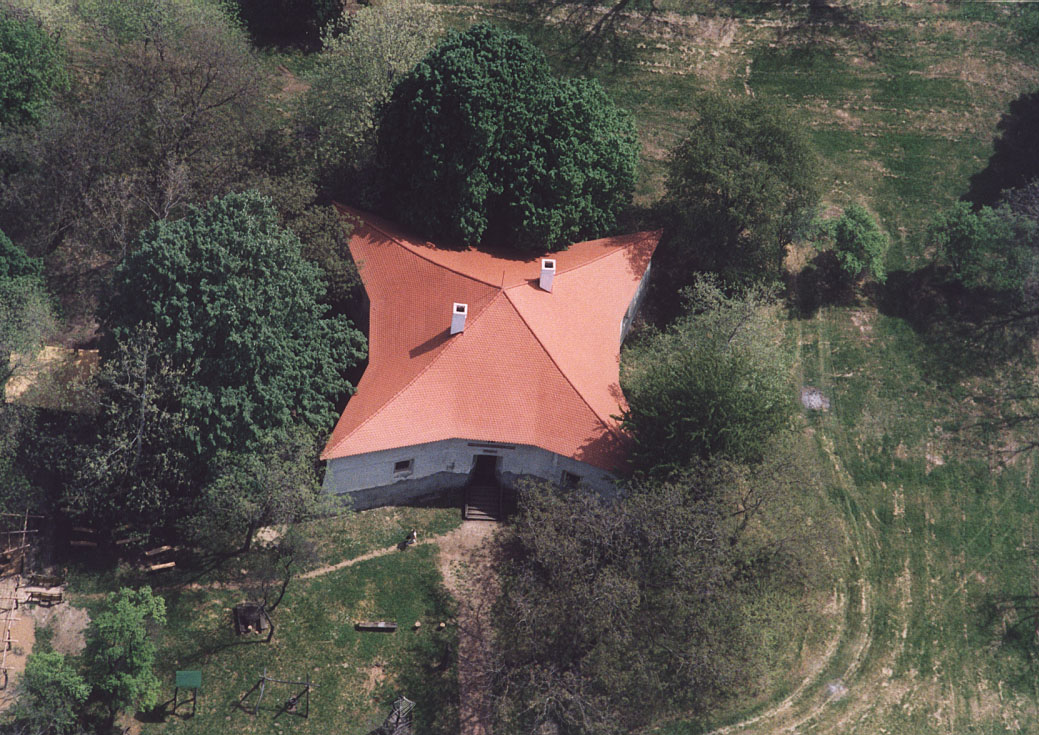
Csillagvár - Balatonszentgyörgy.

=== Public bathing ===
In 1902 there were 170 bathing huts set up in the water, alongside each other across the beach-front as its popularity boomed during the turn of that century.

The hot-water medicinal baths of Hévíz and Zalakaros can be visited by tourists.

== Demographics ==
The country village had a population of 1,200 in 2011.

=== Population change ===
Population	Year	Source
1,200	2011	
1,155	2009	
1,224	2007	
1,210	2001	

== Geography ==
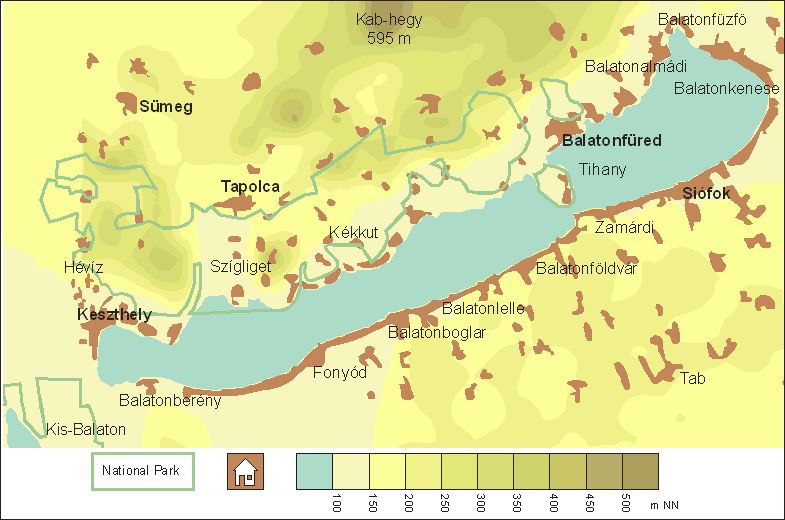
Balatonberény is next to Lake Balaton.

Balatonberény is next to Lake Balaton. The local hills are good for hiking and scenic experiences . A pleasant path goes to the Bokrosi wine-hill that lies above the village, Keszthely Mountain and the monadnocks of Tapolca hollow .

== Transport ==
There are 3 main roads, 1 bus-stop and a railway station in the village. The railway goes to Budapest and Balatonszentgyörgy.

== The arts ==
The Transdanubia Amateur Art Festival is held in July. In summer exhibition of the fine arts in the Painters' House. Village Day is held on 1 May. .

== Culture ==
The Hungarian folk song Elhervadt cidrusfa was collected in Balatonberény in 1906 by Béla Bartók. Balatonberény is also site of the Hungarian Emigration Memorial, situated at Balaton utca, opposite of the station.
