= Halmajugra =

- Village
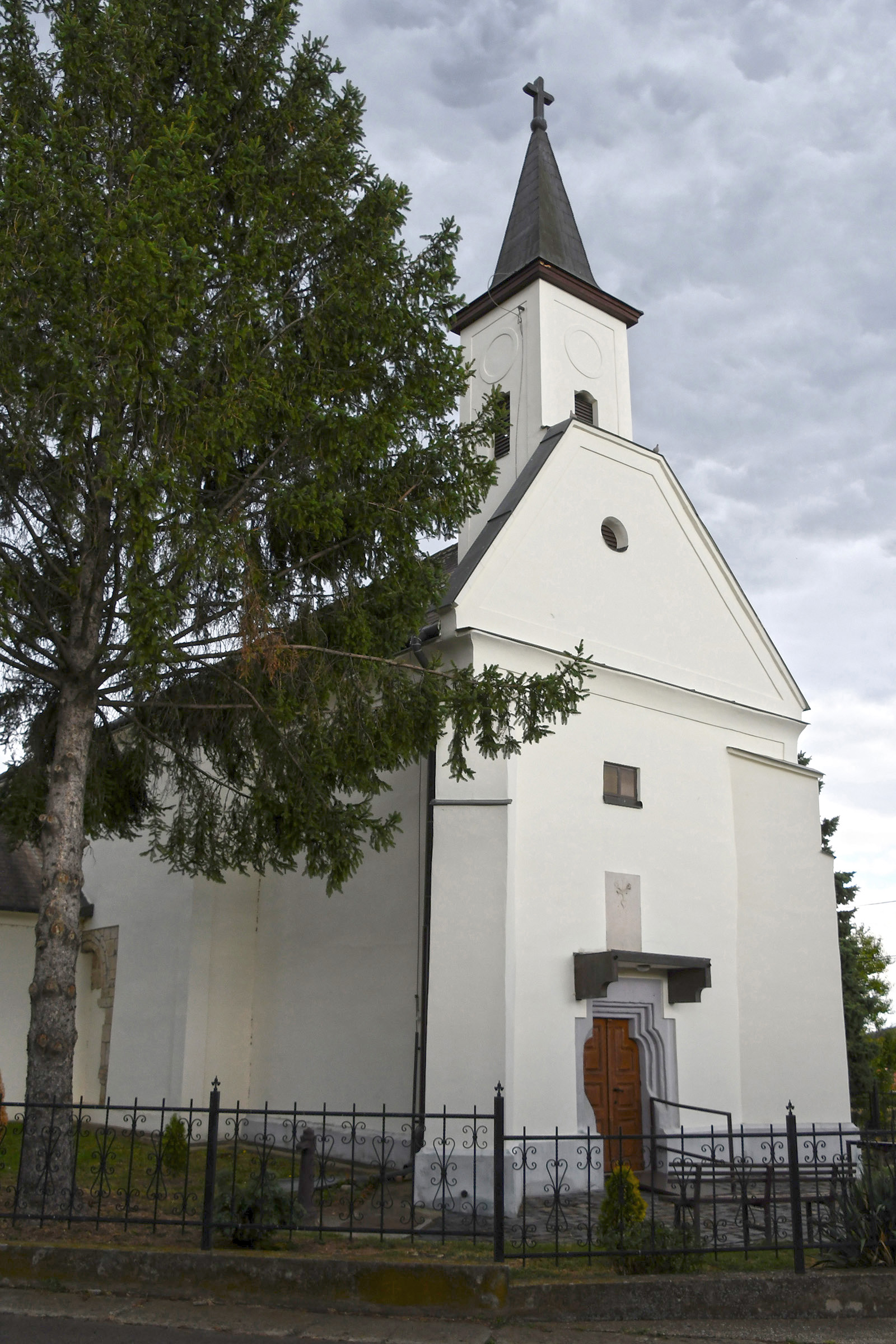
- Saint Emeric Church

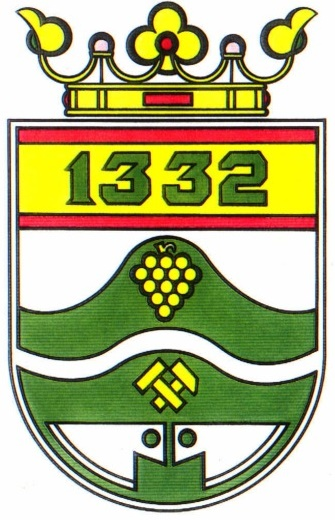
- Coat of arms

- Location in Hungary
- Coordinates: 47°45′40″N 20°03′22″E
- Country: Hungary
- County: Heves
- District: Gyöngyös
- First mentioned: 1337

Government
  - Mayor: Rozália Lakatos, Dr. (Ind.)

Area
  - Total: 21.68 km^{2} (8.37 sq mi)

Population (2022)
  - Total: 1,297
  - Density: 59.82/km^{2} (154.9/sq mi)
- Time zone: UTC+1 (CET)
  - Summer (DST): UTC+2 (CEST)
- Postal code: 3273
- Area code: 37
- Website: www.halmajugra.hu

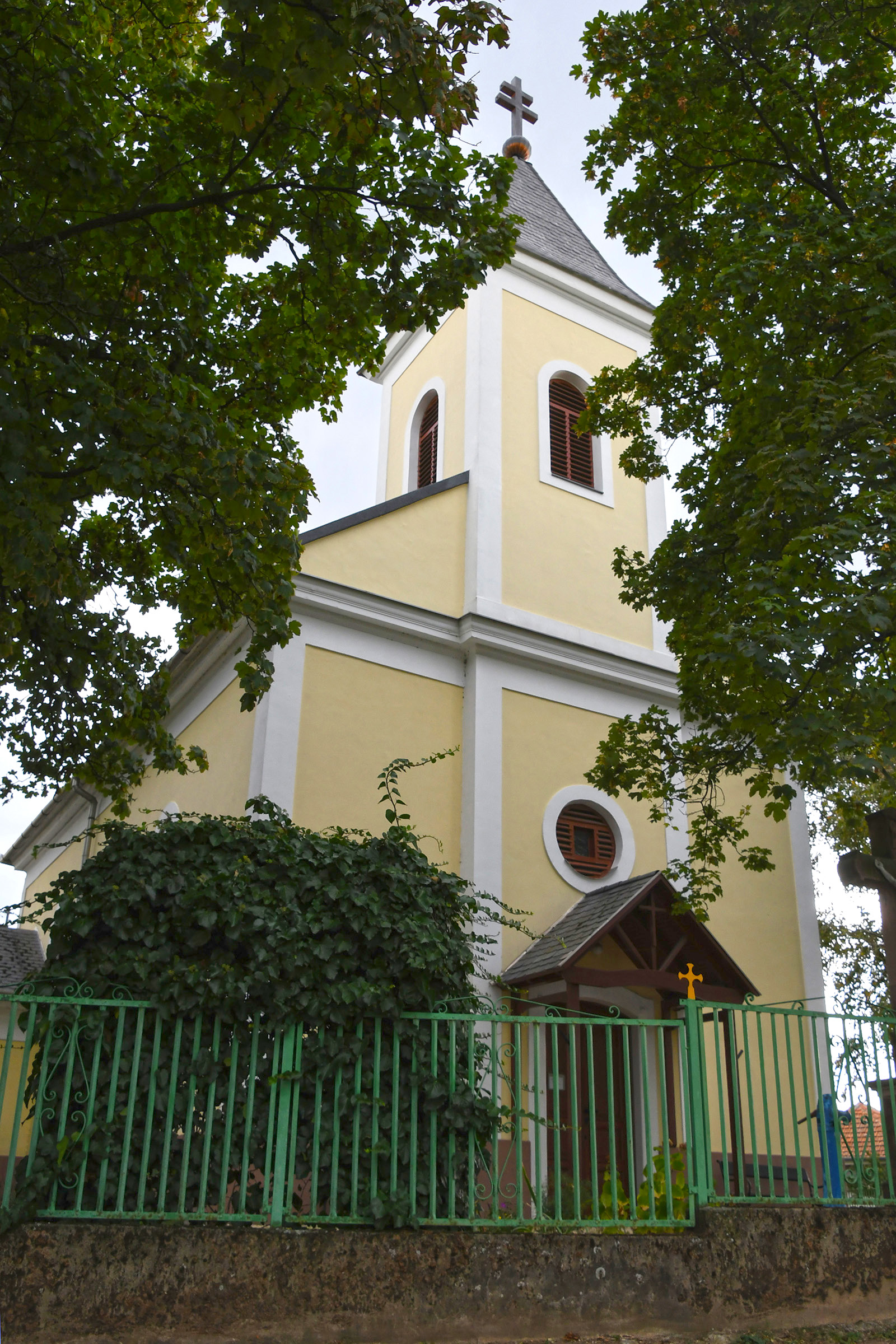
St. Catherine Church

Halmajugra is a village in Heves County, Hungary, between the Bene and Sós-völgyi creeks, south from the Mátra mountain ranges. As of 2022 the census, it had a population of 1297 people.

Located beside Main road 3, 10.7 kilometers from the M3 motorway and 7.8 kilometers from the Nr. 80 Hatvan–Miskolc railway line, the closest train station is in Karácsond.

== History ==
Initially, the town was split in two. The northern part of the settlement, Halmaj, was owned by the Szólok family, while the south, Ugra, was owned by the Aba family. In 1233, Márk Bessenyei came into possession of Halmaj, and Balázs Ugrai claimed ownership over Ugra in 1345. Following the downfall of the Ugrai family, King Albert gave Ugra to the Kompolti family in 1438. The population of Halmaj fled from the Ottomans in 1549, but in Ugra, 10 families were recorded in 1556.

The population returned to Halmaj in the 1570s, and the owner of the settlement became Omar, the Bey of Hatvan. During the 17th century, the settlements became depopulated again. Slovak settlers arrived in Halmaj during 1697, however, Ugra wasn't repopulated until 1718, with the arrival of the Three German Families. Both built in a Baroque style, the St. Catherine Church was created in 1720, whilst the St. Emerich Church in Ugra was constructed during 1733.

In 1770, Halmaj was owned by the Gosztonyi, Almásy, Balogh, Sípos, Somodi and the Csontos families, meanwhile Ugra was the property of Bossányi, Haller, Orczy and the Taródy families. Agriculturally, wheat, maize and grape production became prevalent during this time. In 1907, the organization of the Hangya Cooperative brought significant changes to the town, due to the initiative of Count Sándor Károlyi. The Gypsies arrived at the village at the start of the 20th century, mainly residing on the outskirts of the village, until a flood in 1974 which destroyed their hamlets, forcing them to settle closer to the center of the settlement.

The two settlements were finally united under the name 'Halmajugra' in 1950. Two cooperatives were formed with the leadership of Béla Szalóki and Péter Koska after 1959. However, by 1967 they became uneconomical and united into one. In 1975, the biggest sector in agriculture was viticulture. Lignite open-pit mining began on the outskirts of the village from 1963, eventually leading 36 houses to be demolished in 1994, as they were located above an lignite field. The masonry and construction elements factories (Ytong) were built on the edges of the settlement in 1983.

== Demographics ==
According the 2022 census, 90.2% of the population were of Hungarian ethnicity, 3.8% were Gypsies, and 9.7% were did not wish to answer. The religious distribution was as follows: 7.5% Roman Catholic, 1.1% Calvinist, 24.3% non-denominational, and 63.8% did not wish to answer.

The Gypsies have a local nationality government. No population in farms.

Population by decades:

Year	1870	1880	1890	1900	1910	1920	1930	1941
Population	1040	966	1073	1047	1274	1382	1385	1295
Year	1949	1960	1970	1980	1990	2001	2011	2022
Population	1344	1452	1451	1359	1284	1278	1301	1297

== Politics ==
Mayors since 1990:

- 1990–2002: Mrs. Ferenc Godó (independent)
- 2002–2019: Mrs. Tibor Somodi (independent)
- 2019–: Rozália Lakatos (independent)
