= Bükkábrány =

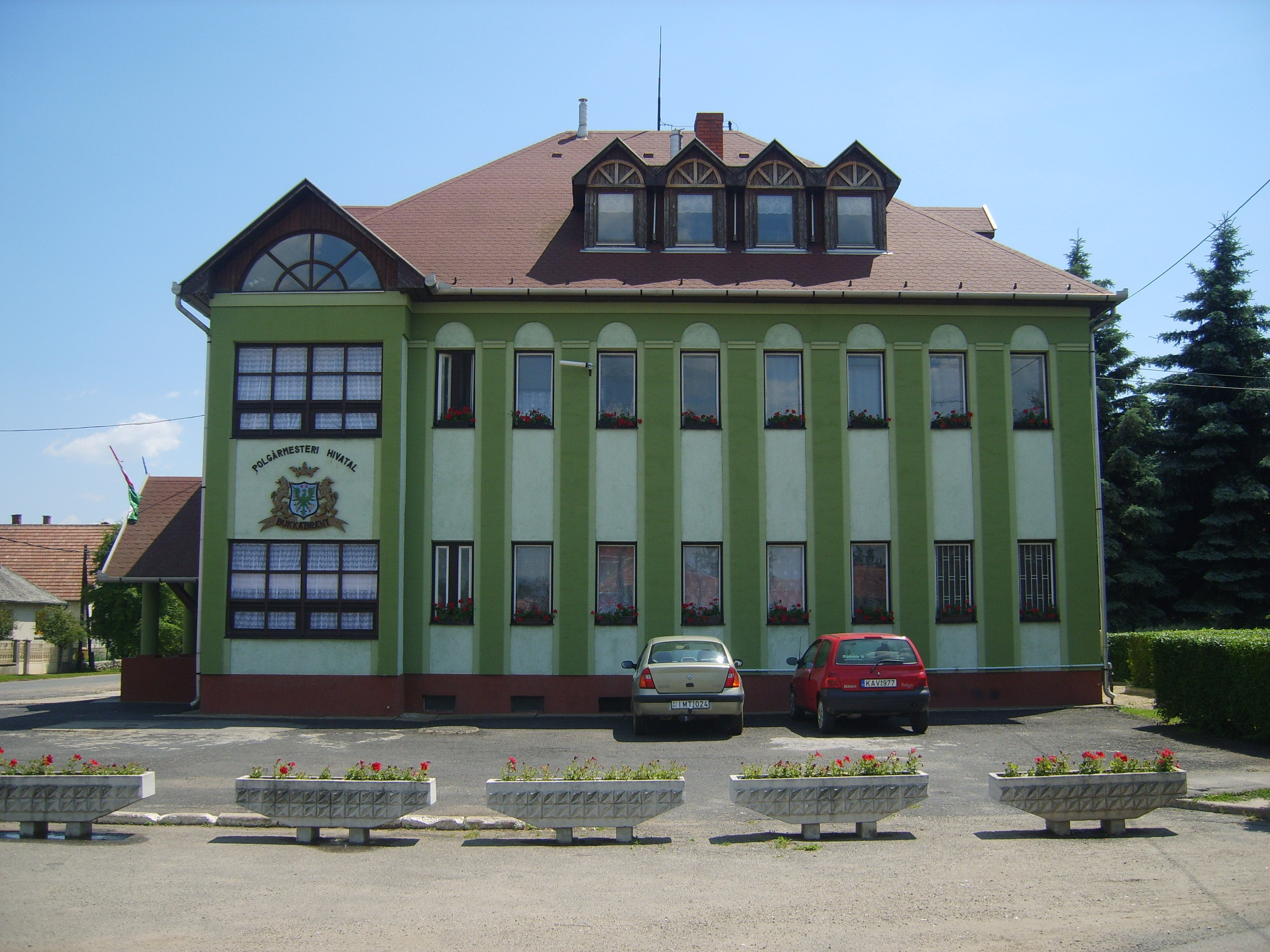
- City Hall of Bükkábrány

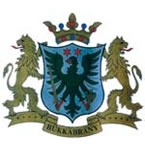
- Seal

- Location of Borsod-Abaúj-Zemplén county in Hungary

- Location of Bükkábrány
- Coordinates: 47.88840°N 20.67927°E
- Country: Hungary
- County: Borsod-Abaúj-Zemplén

Area
  - Total: 18.02 km^{2} (6.96 sq mi)

Population (2004)
  - Total: 1,693
  - Density: 93.95/km^{2} (243.3/sq mi)
- Time zone: UTC+1 (CET)
  - Summer (DST): UTC+2 (CEST)
- Postal code: 3422
- Area code: 49

Bükkábrány is a village in Borsod-Abaúj-Zemplén county, Hungary. In its open cast coal mine palaeontologist found sixteen preserved trunks of cypress trees, estimated to be eight million years old. See 8 million years old cypresses.
