= Visonta =

- Village
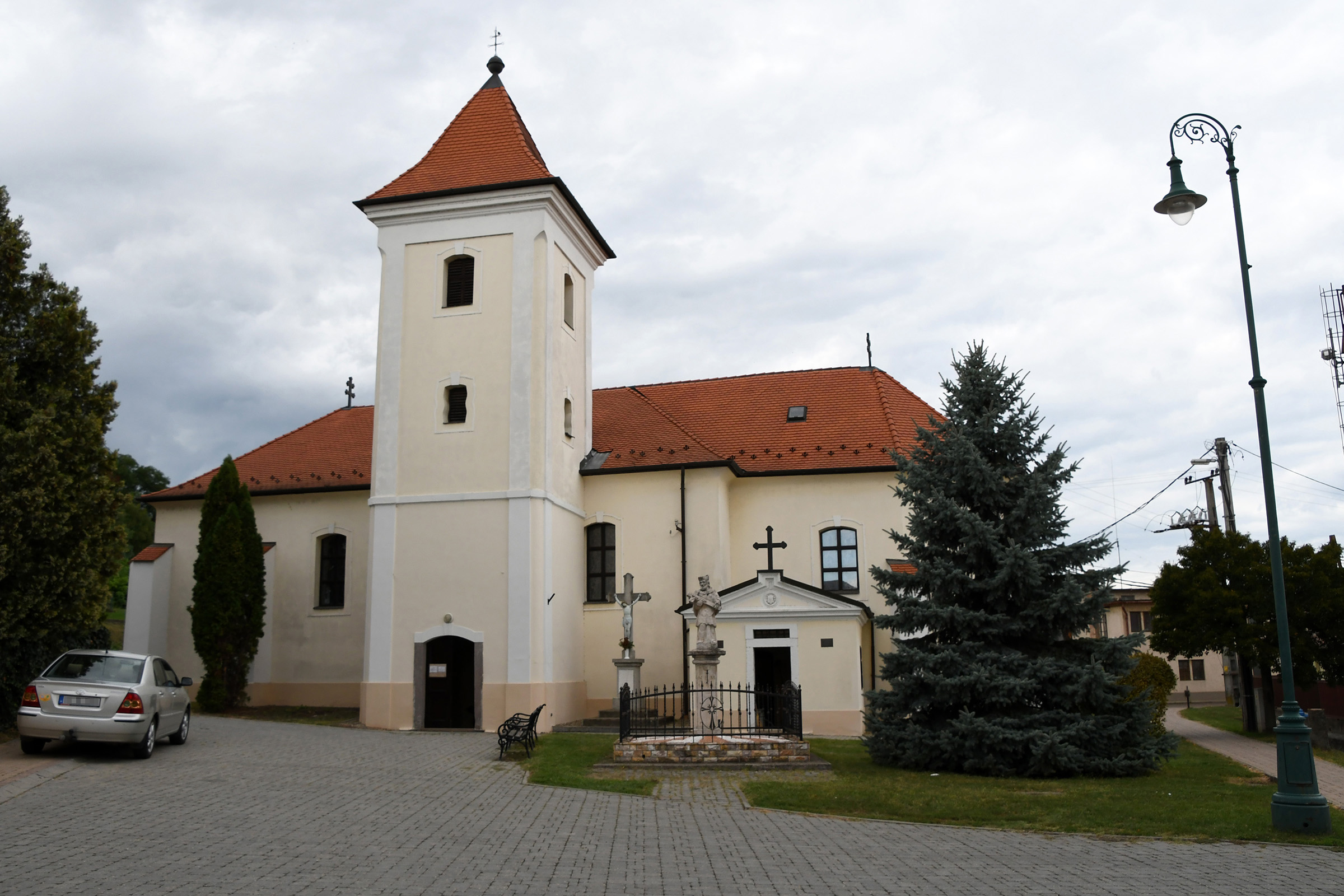
- Exaltation of the Holy Cross Church

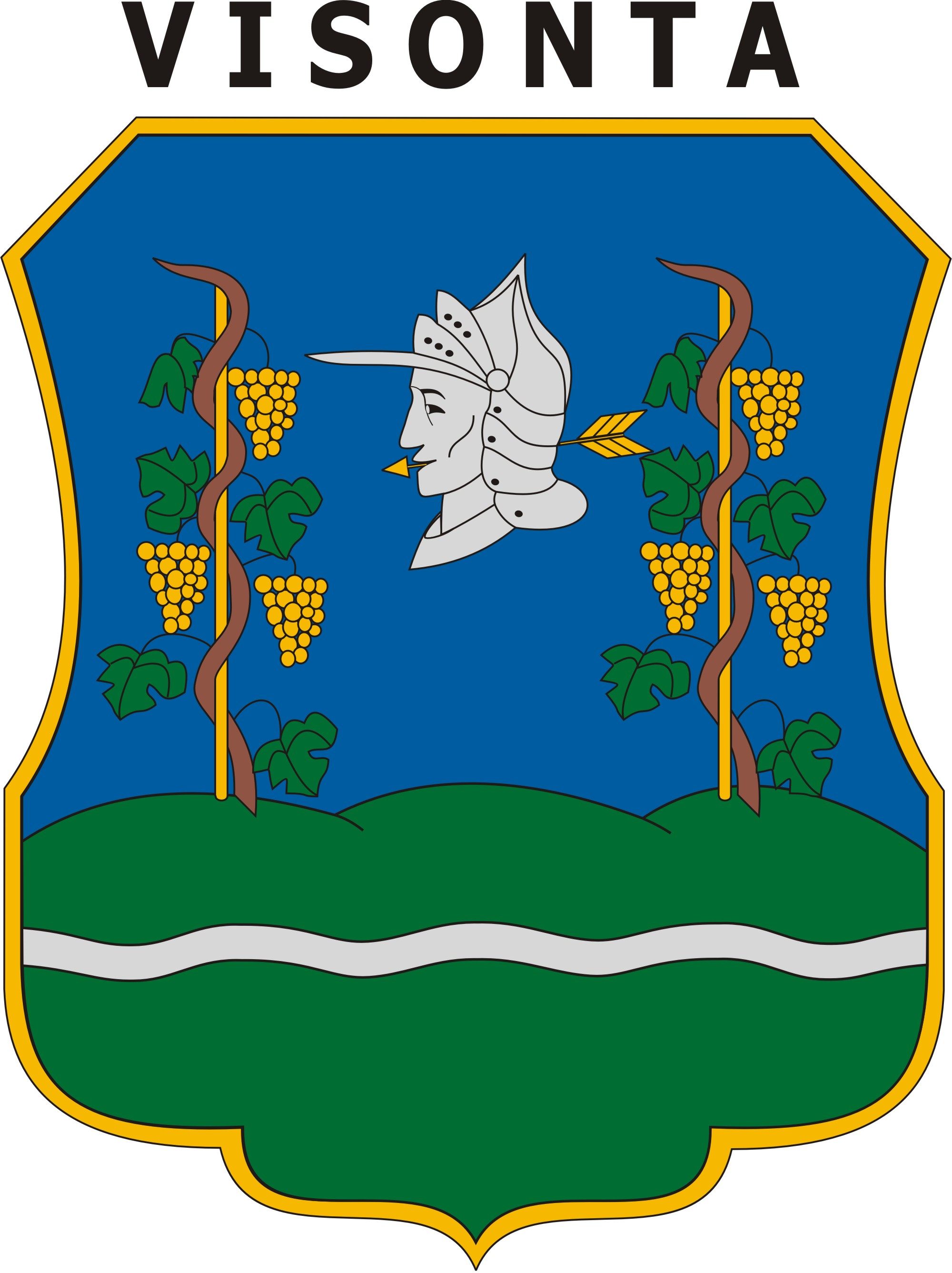
- Coat of arms

- Location in Hungary
- Coordinates: 47°46′48″N 20°01′48″E
- Country: Hungary
- County: Heves
- District: Gyöngyös
- First mentioned: 1279

Government
  - Mayor: László Szarvas (Ind.)

Area
  - Total: 25.29 km^{2} (9.76 sq mi)

Population (2022)
  - Total: 1,159
  - Density: 45.83/km^{2} (118.7/sq mi)
- Time zone: UTC+1 (CET)
  - Summer (DST): UTC+2 (CEST)
- Postal code: 3271
- Area code: 37
- Website: www.visonta.hu

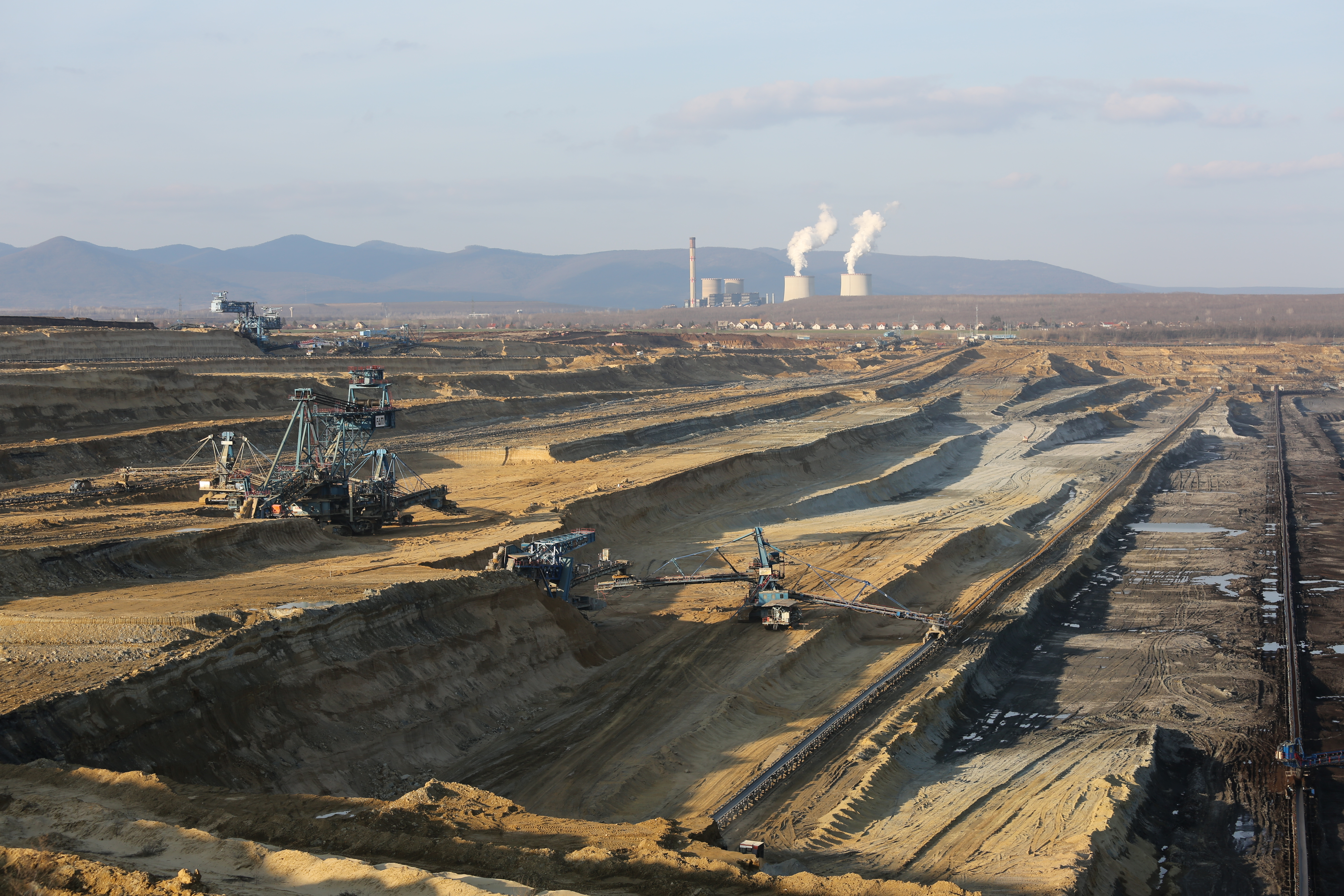
The lignite mine with the Mátra Power Plant in the background

Visonta is a village in Heves County, Hungary, along the Bene creek, beneath the Mátra mountain ranges. As of the 2022 census, it has a population of 1159 (see Demographics). The village is located 9.0 km from (Nr. 85) Vámosgyörk–Gyöngyös railway line, 2.1 km from the main road 3 and 13.3 km from the M3 motorway. The closest train station with public transport is in Gyöngyös.

== History ==
The name of the settlement first appears in a 1279 document in Vysonta. The village was the property of the Csobánka family, and was confiscated by King Charles I for infidelity. The king awarded the village to the Kompolti family, and in 1445 the settlement was already mentioned as a market town. Visonta was inherited by the Országh family in 1522. The Ottomans occupied the region in 1550 and the inhabitants fled. The settlement was populated again after 1696, mostly with Slovak settlers. 52 families were registered in 1771. The settlement had several landlords in the 18th century. One of them, Samuel Haller created the first vineyard farm. The majority of the population turned to wine production. The church of the village was built in the 15th century, and was renovated in 1824, and a spire added in 1854. The construction of the power plant in 1964 was a basic change in the life of the settlement, and the open pit lignite mining started in 1969. However, the population of the settlement continued to engage in viticulture. The government ordered a construction ban in the village in the 1970s, to have the settlement left by the inhabitants. The construction ban was in effect for 10 years, during which the population stagnated. A motocross course was created in the 2000s.

== Demographics ==
According the 2022 census, 91.2% of the population were of Hungarian ethnicity and 8.8% were did not wish to answer. The religious distribution was as follows: 33.6% Roman Catholic, 4.6% Calvinist, 1.1% Greek Catholic, 15.6% non-denominational, and 42.6% did not wish to answer. 2 people live in a farm.

Population by years:

Year	1870	1880	1890	1900	1910	1920	1930	1941
Population	1067	1037	1025	1174	1348	1486	1423	1398
Year	1949	1960	1970	1980	1990	2001	2011	2022
Population	1466	1509	1342	1525	1328	1062	1194	1159

== Politics ==
Mayors since 1990:

- 1990–2006: Mária Bernáth, Mrs. József Ambrusz (independent)
- 2006–: László Szarvas (independent)
