= MVM Group =

Hungarian energy company

- Company type: State company
- Industry: Electricity
- Founded: 1948
- Headquarters: Budapest, Hungary
- Revenue: 646.5 billion HUF (2011)
- Net income: 68,100,000 euro (2018)
- Owner: Hungary (100% state ownership)
- Number of employees: 7,859 (2011)
- Website: mvm.hu

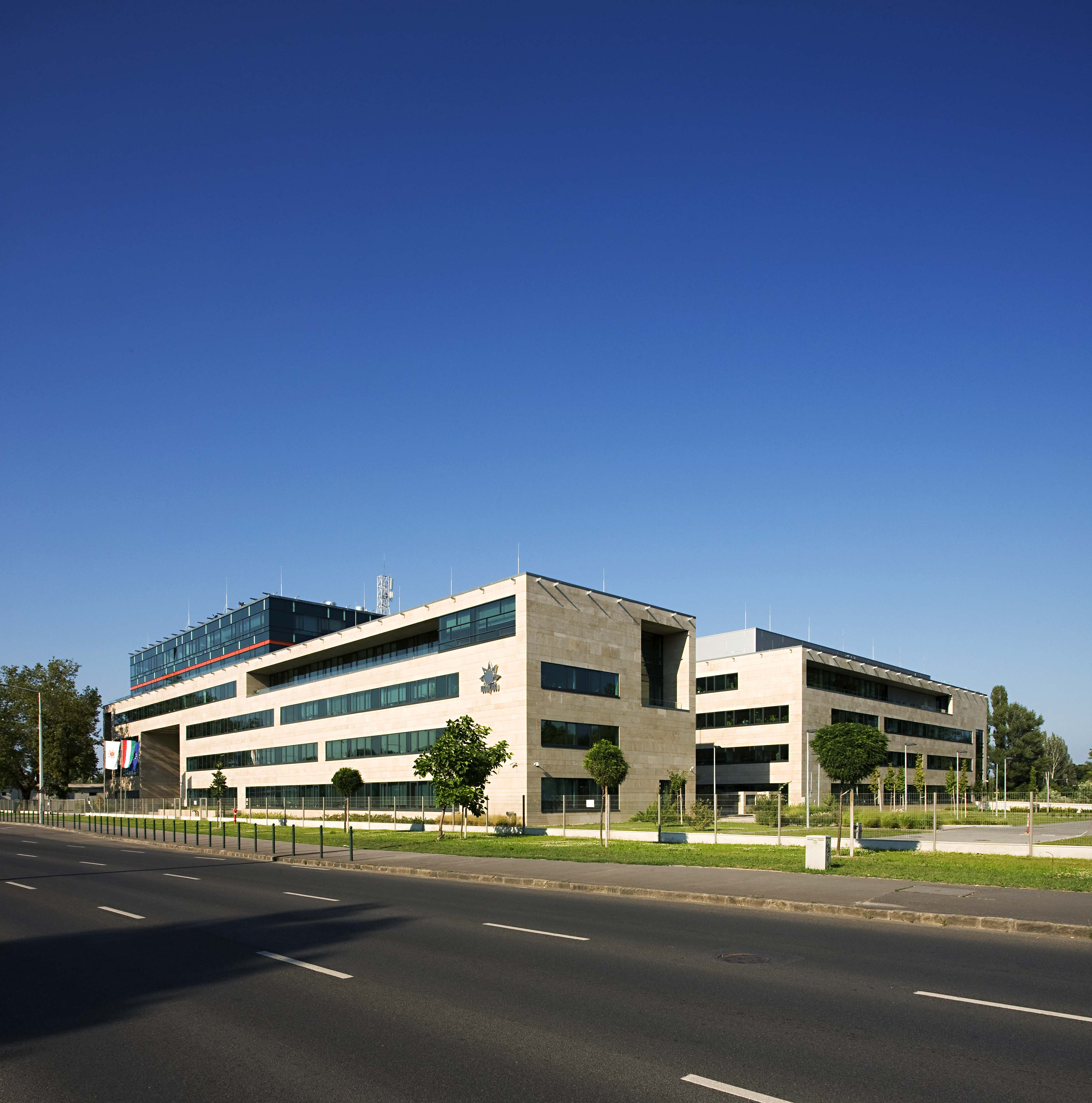
Headquarters in Budapest

MVM Group (Magyar Villamos Művek Zártkörűen működő Részvénytársaság, literally: Hungarian Electrical Works Private Limited Company) is a Hungarian power company, and has a monopoly in Hungary for the production, distribution and sale of electricity.

== Synopsis ==
The company owns several power plants including its most important electricity source: Paks Nuclear Power Plant with a total installed capacity of 2,000 MW and has 3,501 km of transmission lines. This single nuclear power plant provides more than half of Hungary's electrical power. An expansion is currently planned to add an additional two 1200 MW VVER reactors, allowing for Hungary to decrease its carbon emissions and potentially become one of the electricity generators with the lowest carbon emission levels in Europe, along with France and Sweden.

In 2011, MVM entered the natural gas industry and became interested in the proposed gas pipeline South Stream. The Hungarian power company wants to add a connection to the Adriatic Sea to import liquid gas from a planned Croatian gas terminal.

MVM was also a founder (along with two other state enterprises: Magyar Posta and Magyar Fejlesztési Bank) of the new Hungarian state-owned mobile phone company MPVI, but the company proved too expensive to start. MVM sold its share to Magyar Posta in December 2013, and MPVI's board of directors was disbanded on 19 December 2013, finalizing MPVI's incorporation to Magyar Posta.

In the middle of 2012, MVM established a subsidiary for prepare the factual steps of Paks expansion. According to the latest plans the construction will take up in 2021 and the first new unit will be complete several years later.

In October 2020 MVM Group purchased from Enexio the Hungarian firm Enexio Hungary that holds the intellectual property of the Heller-Forgo dry cooling tower system, named EGI.

== MVM EGI Zrt. ==
MVM EGI Zrt. is a Hungarian engineering company specializing in the design and delivery of industrial cooling systems for the global power sector. Based in Budapest, the company is internationally known for its advanced dry, wet, and hybrid cooling technologies, which serve a wide range of energy applications including nuclear, fossil fuel, biomass, waste-to-energy, and renewable power plants.

Founded in 1948 as the Energiagazdálkodási Intézet (Institute for Energy Management), MVM EGI gained global recognition through the development of the Heller Indirect Dry Cooling System, invented by Prof. Dr. László Heller. This system became a benchmark in the industry for large-scale indirect dry cooling, significantly reducing water usage in thermal power generation.

The company was part of the GEA Group and later ENEXIO before becoming a subsidiary of the MVM Group, Hungary’s largest state-owned energy company, in December 2020.

=== MVM EGI Technologies and Applications ===
MVM EGI provides turnkey solutions and engineering services for cooling applications across a wide range of thermal power technologies. Its portfolio includes:

- Heller System – an indirect dry cooling method optimized for high-capacity power plants.
- Air-Cooled Condensers (ACC) – modular, direct dry cooling systems suited to various climate zones.
- Hybrid Cooling Systems – combining dry and wet cooling for optimal thermal and water performance.
- Wet Cooling Towers – designed and manufactured for specific site requirements.

In addition, MVM EGI is the inventor of the Circumix Dense Slurry System, an ash and wastewater management solution that enables the long-term, environmentally safe disposal of fly ash and bottom ash, particularly in coal-fired power plants.

To support its operations and customer base in Asia, MVM EGI maintains two Chinese subsidiaries:

- MVM EGI Cooling Systems (China) Co., Ltd.
- MVM EGI Heat Exchanger Factory, located in Wuqing

== MVM ==
In August 2022 the Hungarian government issued a construction permit for the MVM Group to build a twin VVER-1200-reactor extension to the Paks NPP, which already has four reactors of the VVER-440 type. The contractor is Rosatom and the expected completion date was scheduled for 2030. The contract is majority supported by a Russian state loan.

In August 2023, Qatar agreed to supply Hungary with LNG starting in 2027. MVM started talks with QatarEnergy LNG about quantity, pace and shipment.

== Leadership ==
- Peter Csiba
- György Kóbor (2020)
