= List of palaces and mansions in Somogy County =

This is a list of palaces and mansions in Somogy County in Hungary.

== List of palaces and mansions in Somogy County ==
Name	Location	Established	Architect	Style	Family	Picture	Present function
Kemény Palace	Kaposvár						
Festetics Mansion	Alsóbogát	1830		Classicism			
Festetics–Inkey Mansion	Alsóbogát						
Csapody Mansion	Ádánd	1820–1827		Classicism / late baroque / Zopf	Csapody		
Somssich Mansion	Babócsa						
Ágoston-Madách Mansion	Balatonboglár						
Bárány Mansion	Balatonboglár						
Gaál Mansion	Szőlőskislak (part of Balatonboglár)						
Festetics Mansion	Balatonkeresztúr	1820	Christoph Hofstädter		Festetics		Hotel
Jankovics Mansion	Balatonlelle						
Szaly Mansion	Balatonlelle						
Hunyady Mansion	Balatonszemes						
Satzger Mansion	Bálványos						
Kremsier Mansion	Barcs						
Széchenyi Mansion	Somogytarnóca (part of Barcs)						
Gaál Mansion	Baté						
Goszthony Mansion	Bárdudvarnok						
Festetics Mansion	Berzence	18th century		Baroque; Classicism	Festetics		
Tallián Mansion	Bolhás						
Festetics Mansion	Böhönye						
Pongrácz Mansion	Büssü						
Széchenyi Mansion	Csokonyavisonta						
Pongrácz Mansion	Csombárd						
Meller Mansion	Csurgó						
Kacskovics–Bánó Mansion	Felsőmocsolád	1810–1814			Kacskovics; Bánó		Hotel
Pongrácz Mansion	Felsőmocsolád						
Boros Mansion	Fonyód						
Zichy Mansion	Fonyód						
Festetics Mansion	Gálosfa						
Széchenyi Mansion	Rinyatamási (part of Görgeteg)						
Kacskovics Mansion	Gyugy						
Márffy Mansion	Hencse						
Somssich Mansion	Hetes						
Széchenyi Mansion	Homokszentgyörgy						
Inkey Mansion	Iharosberény	1750		Baroque	Inkey		Primary school
Bíró Mansion	Jákó						
Vótapuszta Mansion	Vótapuszta (part of Kadarkút)						
Somssich Mansion	Kaposújlak	1831		Classicism; Eclecticism	Somssich		Hotel
Festetics Mansion	Toponár (part of Kaposvár)	18th century		Baroque	Festetics		Primary school
Dráva Mansion	Kastélyosdombó						
Hunyady Palace	Kéthely						
Sárközy Mansion	Kisasszond						
Festetics Mansion	Kisgyalán						
Maár Mansion	Kercseliget						
Széchenyi Mansion	Kőröshegy						
Antall Mansion	Kötcse						
Csepinszky Mansion	Kötcse						
Kazay Mansion	Kötcse						
Keserű Mansion	Kötcse						
Hertelendy Mansion	Kutas	19th century		Classicism; Eclecticism	Hertelendy		Hotel
Hoyos Mansion	Lad						
Zichy Mansion	Lengyeltóti	19th century		Rococo; Neobaroque	Zichy		Hotel
Kacskovics Mansion	Tátompuszta (part of Magyaratád)						
Széchenyi Mansion	Marcali	1912		Eclecticism	Széchenyi		Hospital
Piarist Steward Mansion	Mernye						
Somssich Mansion	Mike						
Pallavicini Palace	Mosdós						
Zichy Mansion	Nágocs						
Mándy Mansion	Nagyatád						
Sárközy Mansion	Nagybajom						
Vigyázó Mansion	Nagyberki	1760		Rococo	Schmidegg; Vigyázó		
Berzsenyi Mansion	Nikla						
Tallián Mansion	Osztopán						
Jankovics Mansion	Öreglak						
Czindery Mansion	Ötvöskónyi	1895			Czindery; Chernel		Empty
Gyulai Gaál Mansion	Patalom						
Bogyay Mansion	Pusztakovácsi						
Maár Mansion	Pusztakovácsi						
Márffy Mansion	Pusztakovácsi						
Széchenyi Mansion	Segesd						
Inkey Mansion	Somogybabod						
Perczel Mansion	Somogybükkösd						
Kund Mansion	Somogyfajsz						
Jankovics Mansion (Jankovich-Bésán Mansion)	Somogygeszti						
Somssich Mansion	Somogysárd						
Bosnyák Mansion	Somogytúr						
Inkey Mansion	Somogytúr						
Széchenyi Mansion	Somogyvár	1870		Eclecticism	Széchenyi		Primary school Children's Home
Véssey Mansion	Szőcsénypuszta (part of Somogyzsitfa)						
Fekete Mansion	Szabás						
Tallián Mansion	Szabás						
Tallián Mansion	Szabás						
Szántódpuszta Mansion	Szántódpuszta						
Kladnigg Mansion	Szentgáloskér				Svastics; Kladnigg		Empty
Jankovics Mansion	Szőlősgyörök						
Welsersheimb Mansion	Tab						
Boronkay Mansion	Varászló						
Somssich Mansion	Várda						
Hencz Mansion	Vése						
Jankovich Mansion	Visz						
Festetics Mansion	Vízvár						
Festetics Mansion	Vörs						
Zichy Mansion	Zákányfalu						
Zichy Mansion	Zala						

== See also ==
- List of palaces and mansions in Hungary
- List of castles in Hungary

== Literature ==
- Zsolt Virág : Magyar Kastélylexikon - Somogy megye kastélyai
