= List of tourist attractions in Somogy County =

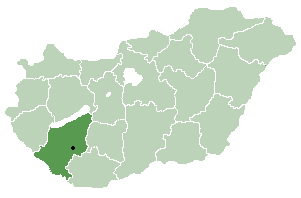
Somogy County

List of tourist attractions in Somogy County is a collection of main sights in Somogy County, Hungary.

== Built environment ==
=== Buildings ===
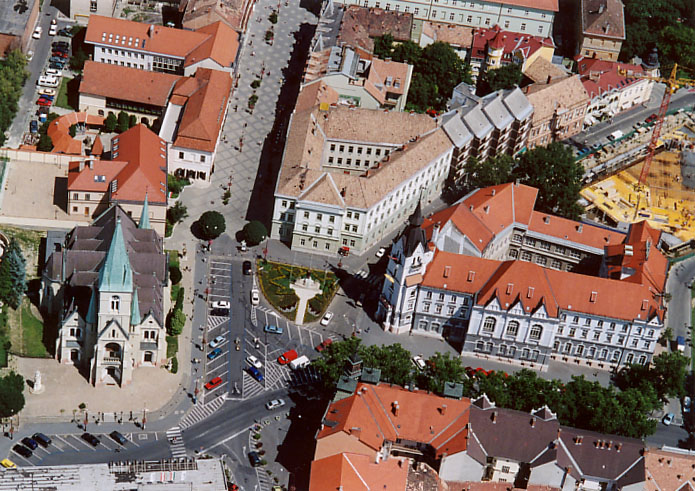
Kaposvár city centre, before the reconstruction

- Kaposvár - historic city centre mostly built in Eclectic style and Secession. (e.g. Arany Oroszlán Gyógyszertár (transl. Golden Lion Pharmacy), Gergely Csiky Theatre, Dorottya Theatre, Dorottya Mall (today a hotel), County Hall, City Hall, Szivárvány Culture Palace etc.)
- Siófok - port with steam boats from the 19th century
- Szólád - loess cellars
- Kaposmérő - Kassay Valley, ancient Hungarian yurts, Lajos Kassai's archery school and exhibition
- Somogyvámos - Krishna Valley
- Patca - Katica Farm
- Bonnya - Garten of Somogy holiday village
- Hajmás - Zselicvölgy amusement park
- Nagyatád - open air sculpture park
- Balatonlelle - Rádpuszta gastronomic experience estate, equestrian centre in the Festetics Mansion
- Zamárdi - amusement park

=== Churches, Chapels, Church ruins ===
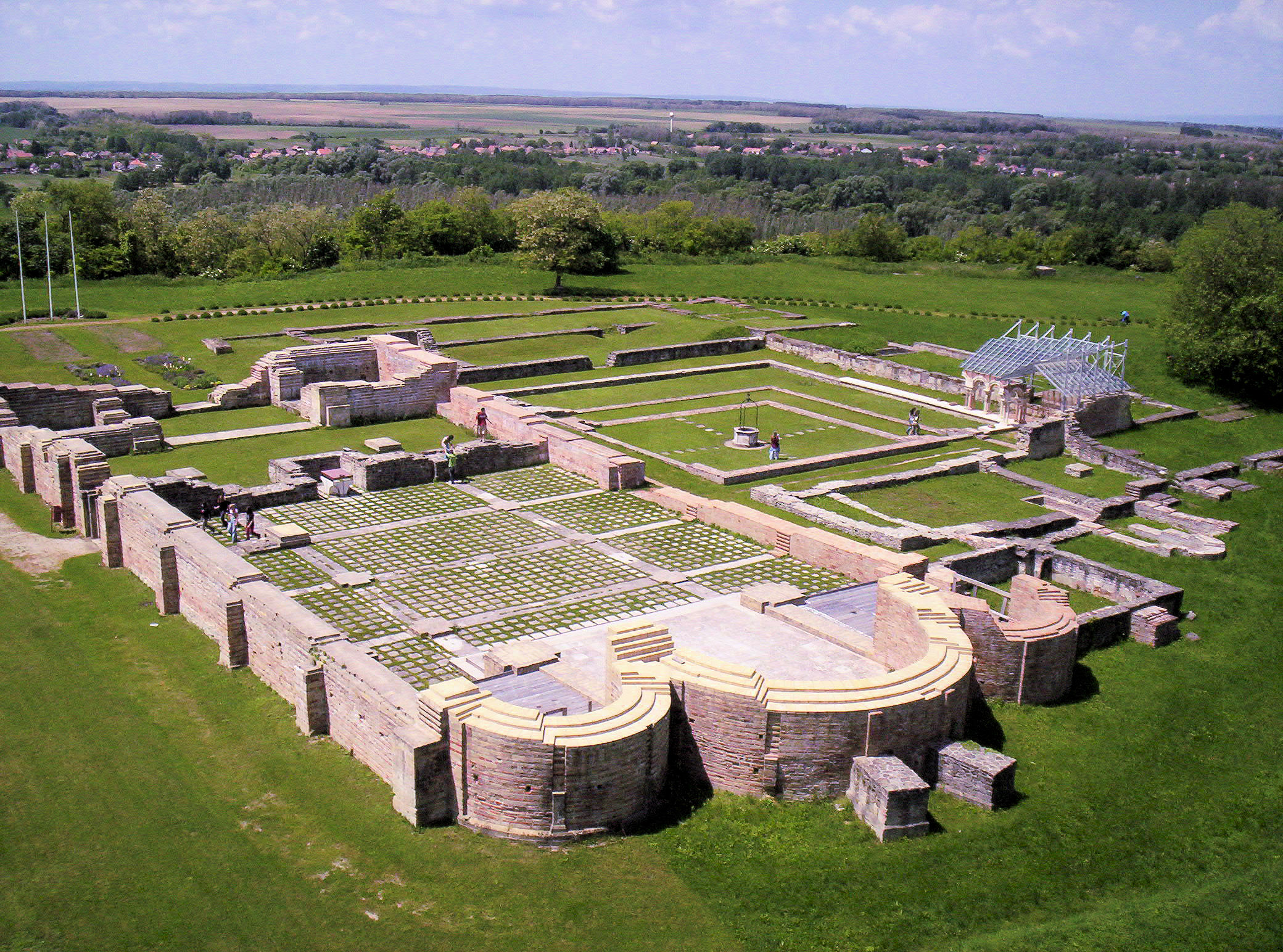
Ruins of Somogyvár Abbey

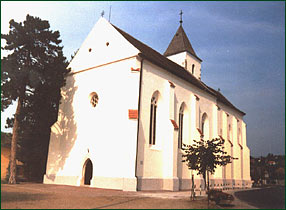
Kőröshegy catholic church

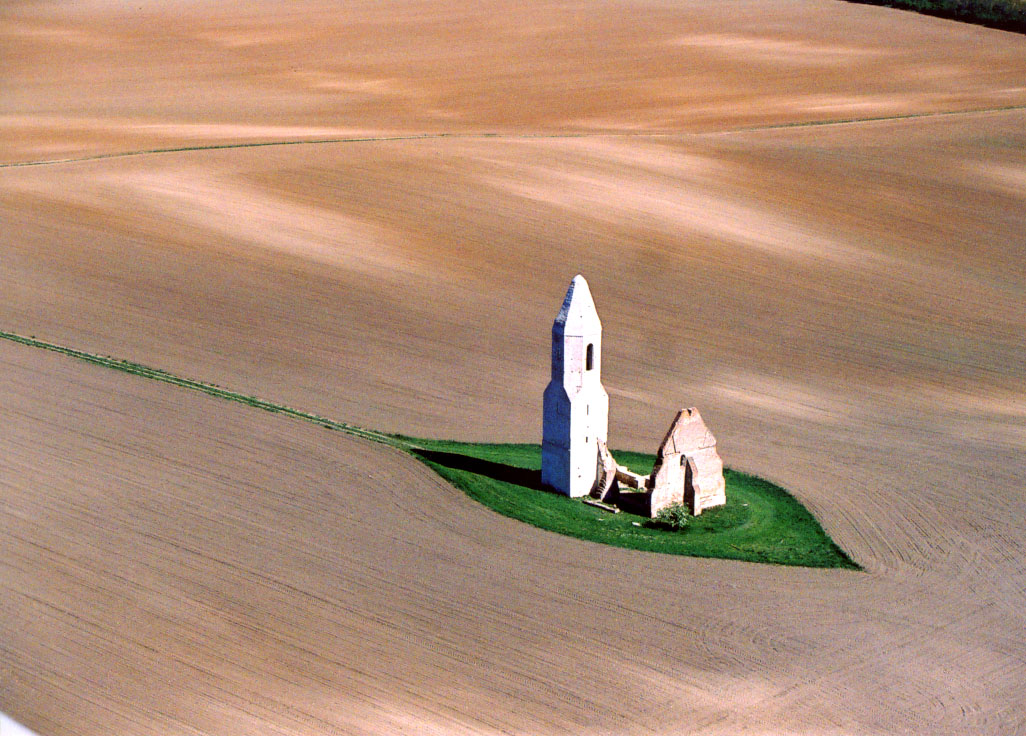
Somogyvámos medieval church ruins

- Kaposvár - Nagyboldogasszony Cathedral - leading church of the Roman Catholic Diocese of Kaposvár
- Kaposvár - Benedictine Abbey of Kaposszentjakab (formerly Abbey of Zselicszentjakab) - medieval ecclesiastical ruins
- Somogyvár - Benedictine Abbey of Saint Giles - medieval ecclesiastical ruins
- Somogyvámos - Pusztatemplom - medieval church ruins
- Gyugy - medieval church ruins
- Siófok - Lutheran Church (built by Imre Makovecz
- Kőröshegy - medieval, gothic church
- Somogyacsa - Chapel of Gerézdpuszta
- Lengyeltóti - partly medieval church
- Somogyszil - baroque church with original gothic elements
- Libickozma - Baptist church
- Lábod - medieval cemetery chapel
- Szenna - Reformed church with wooden cassette
- Szenyér - medieval church
- Őrtilos - Church of Szent Mihály Mountain
- Gadány - medieval church
- Kisgyalán - round church built in 1781
- Ádánd - medieval church
- Somogybükkösd - medieval church
- Segesd - Franciscan monastery and church from the 18th century
- Teleki - medieval chapel
- Rádpuszta, Balatonlelle - medieval church ruins
- Somodor - medieval church ruins
- Somogyszentpál - medieval church ruins
- Vörs - world's biggest Bethlehem (Nativity of Jesus)
- Csurgó - Holy Spirit Church - medieval church
- Andocs - Church of Assumption, one of the most famous Hungarian pilgrimage sites

=== Calvaries ===
- Kaposvár
- Kaposvár
- Balatonföldvár
- Somogyacsa
- Gölle
- Gyugy
- Lengyeltóti
- Somogyvár
- Lad - built in 1855
- Barcs
- Igal
- Andocs
- Marcali
- Csoma

== Museums, Exhibitions, Galleries ==
- Kaposvár - Vaszary House
- Kaposvár - County Museum
- Kaposvár - Rippl-Rónai Villa
- Kaposvár - Steiner Gallery
- Nikla - Berzsenyi Mension with its museum
- Barcs - Drava Museum
- Somogyfajsz - old smelter
- Siófok - Crytall Museum
- Siófok - House of Emmerich Kálmán
- Vörs - Firefighter Museum
- Tab - Ferenc Nagy Gallery
- Andocs - Museum of Mary clothes brought by pilgrims for the Statue of Mary
- Somogytúr - House of Lajos Kunffy
- Zala - Mihály Zichy Museum
- Bábonymegyer - House of Gyula Rudnay
- Segesd - local museum in the old mill
- Nagyatád - town museum
- Marcali - town museum
- Gölle - birthplace of István Fekete
- Balatonboglár - local museum in the Fischl House
- Újvárfalva - Noszlopy Mansion, birthplace of Gáspár Noszlopy
- Nagybajom - local museum
- Balatonendréd - Lace Museum
- Balatonszemes - Post Museum
- Balatonszemes - House of Zoltán Latinovits
- Zselickisfalud - planetary, observatory
- Péterhida - water mill

== See also ==
- Tourism in Hungary
- Somogy County
