= Kazsok =

- Village
- Coat of arms

- Location of Somogy county in Hungary

- Location of Kazsok
- Coordinates: 46.47964°N 17.96509°E
- Country: Hungary
- Region: Southern Transdanubia
- County: Somogy
- District: Kaposvár
- RC Diocese: Kaposvár

Area
  - Total: 10.71 km^{2} (4.14 sq mi)

Population (2017)
  - Total: 329
  - Density: 30.7/km^{2} (79.6/sq mi)
- Demonym: kazsoki
- Time zone: UTC+1 (CET)
  - Summer (DST): UTC+2 (CEST)
- Postal code: 7274
- Area code: (+36) 82
- NUTS 3 code: HU232
- MP: Mihály Witzmann (Fidesz)

Kazsok is a village in Somogy county, Hungary.

== History ==
According to László Szita the settlement was completely Hungarian in the 18th century.
