= Ráksi =

- Village
- Coat of arms

- Location of Somogy county in Hungary

- Location of Ráksi
- Coordinates: 46.51701°N 17.9191°E
- Country: Hungary
- Region: Southern Transdanubia
- County: Somogy
- District: Kaposvár
- RC Diocese: Kaposvár

Area
  - Total: 15.17 km^{2} (5.86 sq mi)

Population (2017)
  - Total: 419
  - Density: 27.6/km^{2} (71.5/sq mi)
- Demonym: ráksi
- Time zone: UTC+1 (CET)
  - Summer (DST): UTC+2 (CEST)
- Postal code: 7464
- Area code: (+36) 82
- NUTS 3 code: HU232
- MP: Mihály Witzmann (Fidesz)
- Website: Ráksi Online

Ráksi is a village in Somogy county, Hungary.

== History ==
According to László Szita the settlement was completely Hungarian in the 18th century.
