= Edde, Hungary =

Edde
- Village
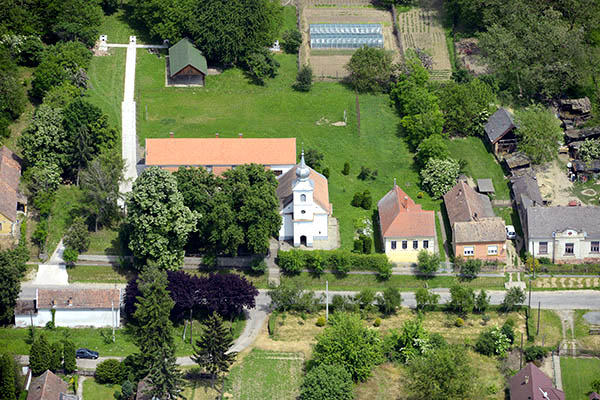
- Edde

- Coat of arms

- Location of Somogy county in Hungary

- Location of Edde, Hungary
- Coordinates: 46.52433°N 17.71760°E
- Country: Hungary
- Region: Southern Transdanubia
- County: Somogy
- District: Kaposvár
- RC Diocese: Kaposvár

Area
  - Total: 8.51 km^{2} (3.29 sq mi)

Population (2017)
  - Total: 198
  - Density: 23.3/km^{2} (60.3/sq mi)
- Demonym: eddei
- Time zone: UTC+1 (CET)
  - Summer (DST): UTC+2 (CEST)
- Postal code: 7443
- Area code: (+36) 82
- NUTS 3 code: HU232
- MP: József Attila Móring (KDNP)
- Website: Edde Online

Edde is a village in Somogy county, Hungary.
