= List of populated places in Hungary (Zs) =

This is a list of cities, towns and villages of Hungary

KEY: T = Town ; V = Village

| Name | Rank | County | District | Population | Post code |
|---|---|---|---|---|---|
| Zsadány | V | Békés | Sarkadi | 1,807 | 5537 |
| Zsáka | V | Hajdú-Bihar | Berettyóújfalui | 1,717 | 4142 |
| Zsámbék | V | Pest | Pilisvörösvári | 4,748 | 2072 |
| Zsámbok | V | Pest | Gödölloi | 2,430 | 2116 |
| Zsana | V | Bács-Kiskun | Kiskunhalasi | 900 | 6411 |
| Zsarolyán | V | Szabolcs-Szatmár-Bereg | Fehérgyarmati | 460 | 4961 |
| Zsebeháza | V | Gyor-Moson-Sopron | Csornai | 149 | 9346 |
| Zsédeny | V | Tolna | Sárvári | 215 | 9635 |
| Zselickisfalud | V | Somogy | Kaposvári | 279 | 7477 |
| Zselickislak | V | Somogy | Kaposvári | 336 | 7400 |
| Zselicszentpál | V | Somogy | Kaposvári | 408 | 7474 |
| Zsennye | V | Tolna | Szombathelyi | 102 | 9766 |
| Zsira | V | Gyor-Moson-Sopron | Sopron–Fertodi | 770 | 9476 |
| Zsombó | V | Csongrád | Szegedi | 3,368 | 6792 |
| Zsujta | V | Borsod-Abaúj-Zemplén | Abaúj–Hegyközi | 196 | 3897 |
| Zsurk | V | Szabolcs-Szatmár-Bereg | Kisvárdai | 787 | 4627 |

== Notes ==
- Cities marked with * have several different post codes, the one here is only the most general one.
