= Fonó =

- Village
- Coat of arms

- Location of Somogy county in Hungary

- Location of Fonó
- Coordinates: 46.39831°N 17.95481°E
- Country: Hungary
- Region: Southern Transdanubia
- County: Somogy
- District: Kaposvár
- RC Diocese: Kaposvár

Area
  - Total: 10.61 km^{2} (4.10 sq mi)

Population (2017)
  - Total: 248
  - Density: 23.4/km^{2} (60.5/sq mi)
- Demonym: fonói
- Time zone: UTC+1 (CET)
  - Summer (DST): UTC+2 (CEST)
- Postal code: 7271
- Area code: (+36) 82
- NUTS 3 code: HU232
- MP: Mihály Witzmann (Fidesz)
- Website: Fonó Online

Fonó is a village in Somogy county, Hungary.
