= Hedrehely =

Hedrehely Hadralj (in Croatian)
- Village
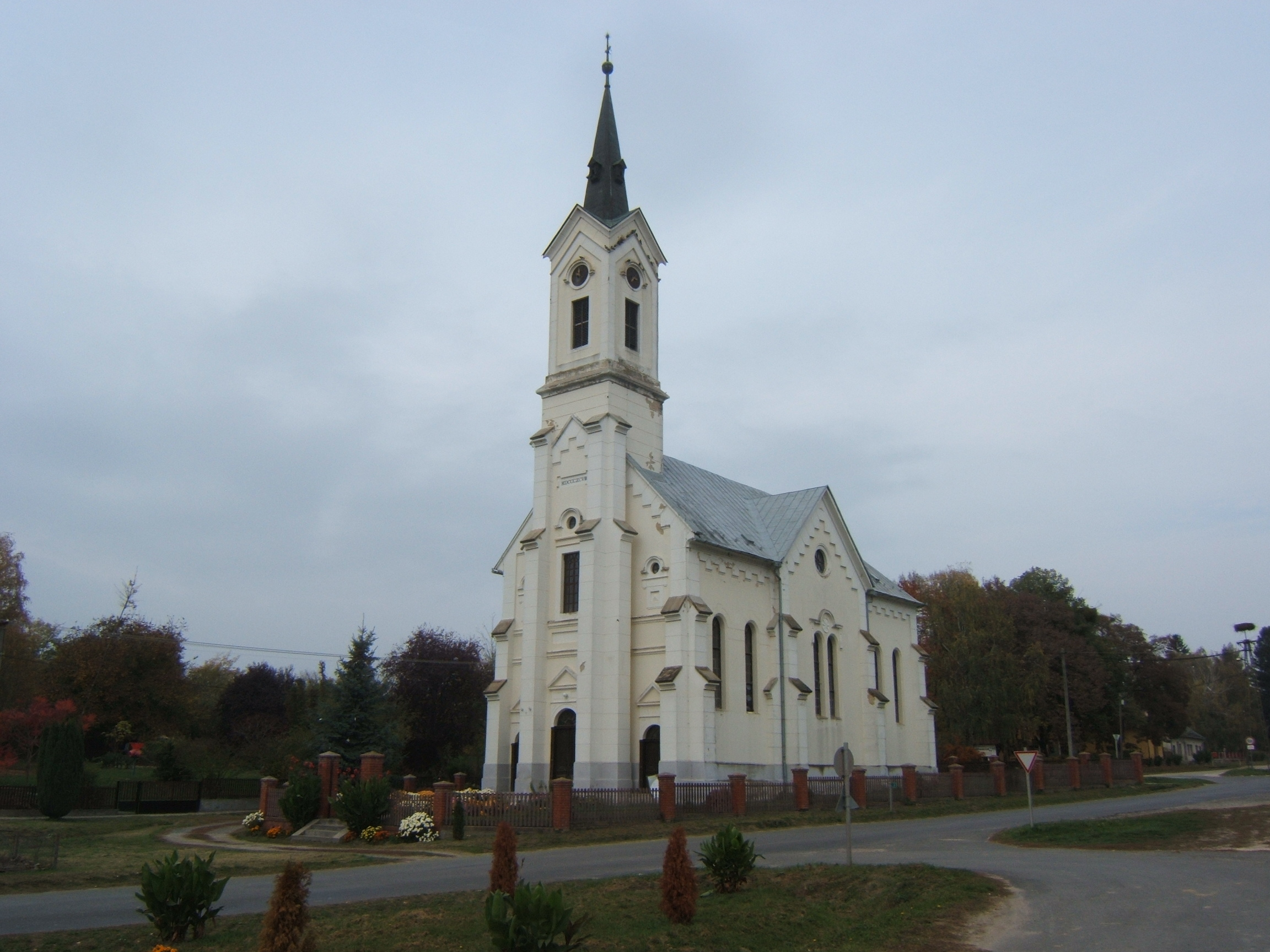
- Reformed Church of Hedrehely

- Coat of arms

- Location of Somogy county in Hungary

- Location of Hedrehely
- Coordinates: 46.20167°N 17.64902°E
- Country: Hungary
- Region: Southern Transdanubia
- County: Somogy
- District: Kaposvár
- RC Diocese: Kaposvár

Area
  - Total: 25.51 km^{2} (9.85 sq mi)

Population (2017)
  - Total: 375
  - Density: 14.7/km^{2} (38.1/sq mi)
- Demonym: hedrehelyi
- Time zone: UTC+1 (CET)
  - Summer (DST): UTC+2 (CEST)
- Postal code: 7533
- Area code: (+36) 82
- NUTS 3 code: HU232
- MP: László Szászfalvi (KDNP)

Hedrehely (Croatian: Hadralj) is a village in Somogy county, Hungary.

== History ==
According to László Szita the settlement was completely Hungarian in the 18th century.
