= Kaposfő =

- Village
- Coat of arms

- Location of Somogy county in Hungary

- Location of Kaposfő
- Coordinates: 46.35865°N 17.66224°E
- Country: Hungary
- Region: Southern Transdanubia
- County: Somogy
- District: Kaposvár
- RC Diocese: Kaposvár

Area
  - Total: 27.26 km^{2} (10.53 sq mi)

Population (2017)
  - Total: 1,540
  - Density: 56.5/km^{2} (146/sq mi)
- Demonym: kaposfői
- Time zone: UTC+1 (CET)
  - Summer (DST): UTC+2 (CEST)
- Postal code: 7523
- Area code: (+36) 82
- NUTS 3 code: HU232
- MP: László Szászfalvi (KDNP)
- Website: Kaposfő Online

Kaposfő is a village in Somogy county, Hungary.
