= Csököly =

Csököly Čukuja (in Croatian)
- Village
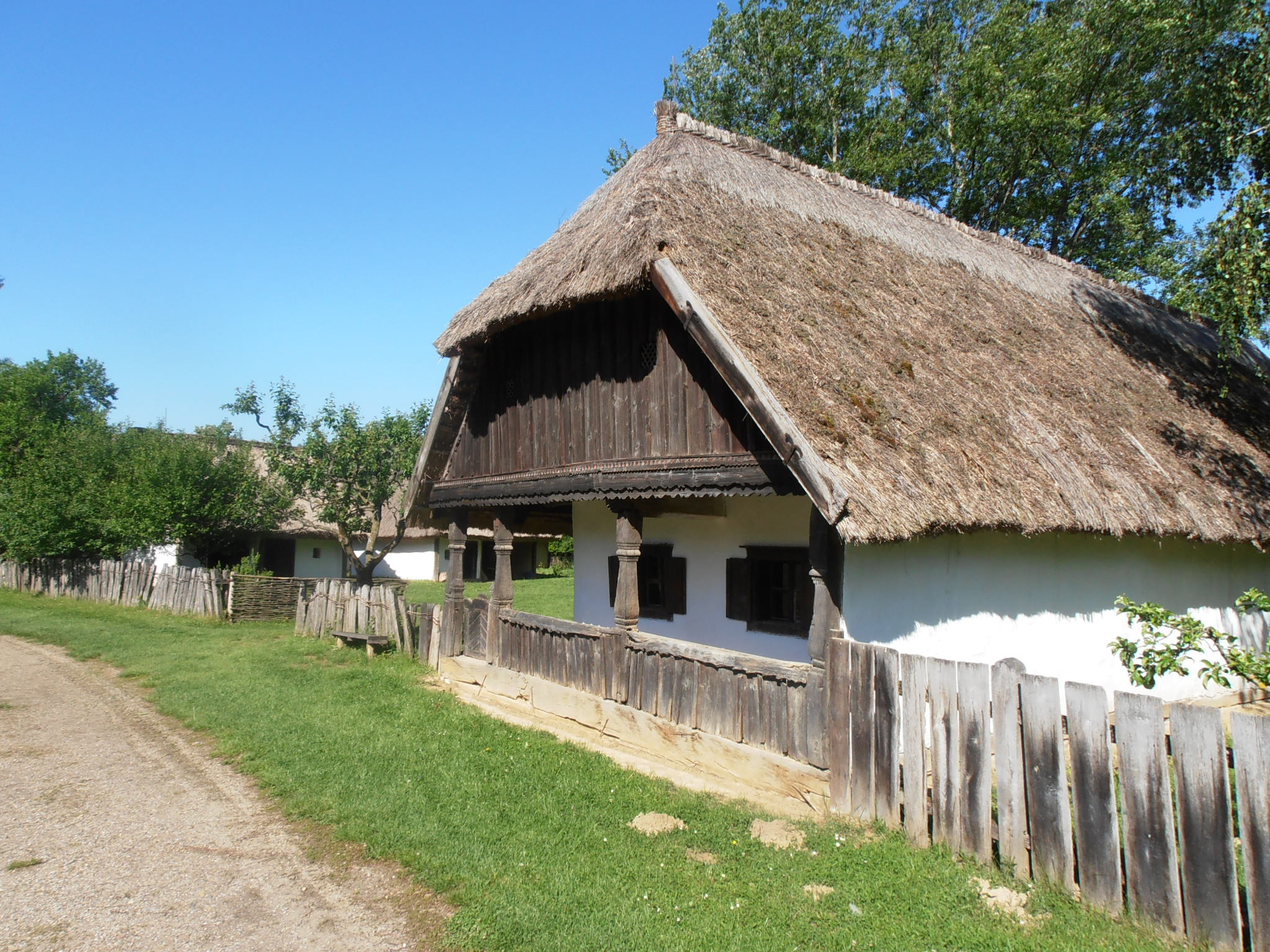
- Csököly's folk architecture

- Coat of arms

- Location of Somogy county in Hungary

- Location of Csököly
- Coordinates: 46.29949°N 17.56085°E
- Country: Hungary
- Region: Southern Transdanubia
- County: Somogy
- District: Kaposvár
- RC Diocese: Kaposvár

Area
  - Total: 29.84 km^{2} (11.52 sq mi)

Population (2017)
  - Total: 1,047
  - Density: 35.09/km^{2} (90.88/sq mi)
- Demonym: csökölyi
- Time zone: UTC+1 (CET)
  - Summer (DST): UTC+2 (CEST)
- Postal code: 7526
- Area code: (+36) 82
- NUTS 3 code: HU232
- MP: László Szászfalvi (KDNP)
- Website: Csököly Online

Csököly (Croatian: Čukuja) is a village in Somogy county, Hungary.

== History ==
According to László Szita the settlement was completely Hungarian in the 18th century.
