= Ecseny =

Ecseny Etsching
- Village
- Coat of arms

- Location of Somogy county in Hungary

- Location of Ecseny
- Coordinates: 46.77596°N 18.02684°E
- Country: Hungary
- Region: Southern Transdanubia
- County: Somogy
- District: Kaposvár
- RC Diocese: Kaposvár

Area
  - Total: 12.92 km^{2} (4.99 sq mi)

Population (2017)
  - Total: 198
  - Density: 15.3/km^{2} (39.7/sq mi)
- Demonym: ecsenyi
- Time zone: UTC+1 (CET)
  - Summer (DST): UTC+2 (CEST)
- Postal code: 7457
- Area code: (+36) 82
- NUTS 3 code: HU232
- MP: Mihály Witzmann (Fidesz)
- Website: Ecseny Online

Ecseny (German: Etsching) is a village in Somogy county, Hungary.

== Geography ==
The settlement is located in the northeastern part of Somogy County, 8 km from R67, 31 km north of Kaposvár, 39 kilometers south of Balatonlelle. By public transport on the R67 it can be approached from the direction of Felsőmocsolád. Ecseny is embraced in a strongly divided north–south valley. Despite the small number of people, it has a large 13 km road network, 50% of that is dirt road.

== History ==
The name of the village was first mentioned in 1193 in a document of Béla III. During Ottoman occupation Ecseny got depopulated. Under the reign of Maria Theresa Luthern Swabians settled there. Around 1780 Lutheran Swabian settlers from Tolna County and Baranya County arrived. Until the middle of the 18th century the village belonged to the Perneszy family. In 1848 there were 109 households. In 1930 it had 1022 German and 38 Hungarian residents. After the Second World War about 30% of Germans were deported during the Expulsion. In their houses Hungarians from Upper Hungary moved in within the Czechoslovak–Hungarian population exchange. In 1950 the village had 1150 residents.

== Demographics ==
In the last census of 2011 88.1% of the 214 residents were Hungarian and 14.9% German. There were also 1 Croat and 1 Slovak. The religious affiliation of the citizens show a 46.0% Lutheran majority with a significant 25.2% Roman Catholic and 5.9% Calvinist minority. 3.5% did not belong to any churches.

According to the latest data of the municipality, there were 198 permanent residents in the village.

However, in the last years several German, Dutch and Austrian bought houses there which they use as summer residence.

== Main sights ==
- Lutheran Church built in 1842–1843. Due to the fireworks, it had to be rebuilt several times, lastly rebuilt in 1994.
- Lutheran Cultural House was built in 1937, on the floor with a teacher's apartment. Today, this building is the village hall.
