= Zimány =

- Village
- Coat of arms

- Location of Somogy county in Hungary

- Location of Zimány
- Coordinates: 46.42394°N 17.91154°E
- Country: Hungary
- Region: Southern Transdanubia
- County: Somogy
- District: Kaposvár
- RC Diocese: Kaposvár

Area
  - Total: 12.97 km^{2} (5.01 sq mi)

Population (2017)
  - Total: 558
  - Density: 43.0/km^{2} (111/sq mi)
- Demonym: zimányi
- Time zone: UTC+1 (CET)
  - Summer (DST): UTC+2 (CEST)
- Postal code: 7471
- Area code: (+36) 82
- NUTS 3 code: HU232
- MP: Mihály Witzmann (Fidesz)
- Website: Zimány Online

Zimány is a village in Somogy county, Hungary.
