= Somogyjád =

- Village
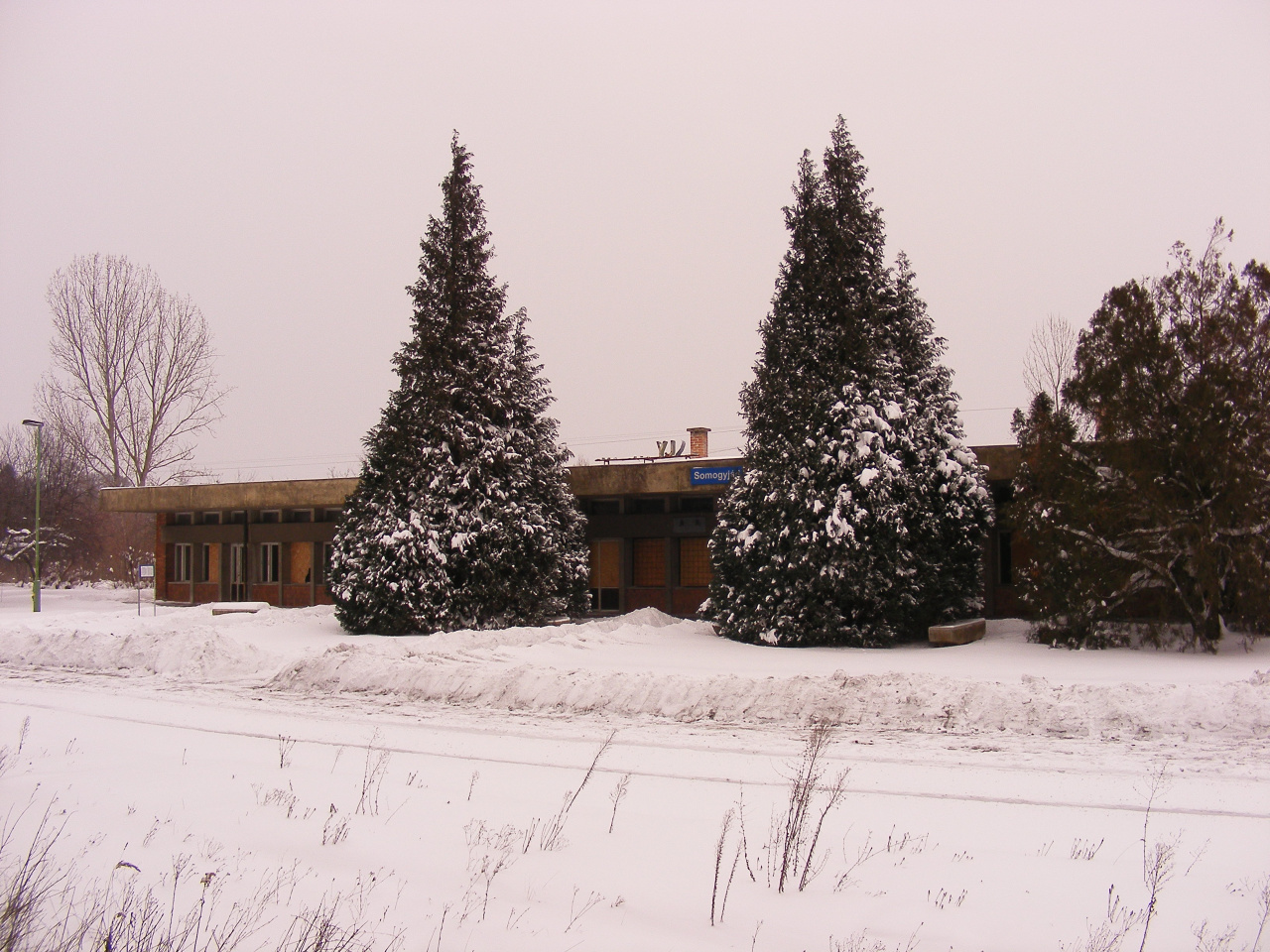
- Somogyjád train station in winter

- Coat of arms

- Location of Somogy county in Hungary

- Location of Somogyjád
- Coordinates: 46.48919°N 17.71191°E
- Country: Hungary
- Region: Southern Transdanubia
- County: Somogy
- District: Kaposvár
- RC Diocese: Kaposvár

Area
  - Total: 25.06 km^{2} (9.68 sq mi)

Population (2017)
  - Total: 1,547
  - Density: 61.73/km^{2} (159.9/sq mi)
- Demonym: somogyjádi
- Time zone: UTC+1 (CET)
  - Summer (DST): UTC+2 (CEST)
- Postal code: 7443
- Area code: (+36) 82
- NUTS 3 code: HU232
- MP: József Attila Móring (KDNP)
- Website: Somogyjád Online

Somogyjád is a village in Somogy county, Hungary.
