= Mike, Hungary =

Mike
- Village
- Coat of arms

- Location of Mike, Hungary
- Coordinates: 46.24046°N 17.53016°E
- Country: Hungary
- Region: Southern Transdanubia
- County: Somogy
- District: Kaposvár
- RC Diocese: Kaposvár

Area
  - Total: 32.41 km^{2} (12.51 sq mi)

Population (2017)
  - Total: 589
  - Density: 18.2/km^{2} (47.1/sq mi)
- Demonym: mikei
- Time zone: UTC+1 (CET)
  - Summer (DST): UTC+2 (CEST)
- Postal code: 7512
- Area code: (+36) 82
- NUTS 3 code: HU232
- MP: László Szászfalvi (KDNP)
- Website: Mike Online

Mike is a village in Somogy county, Hungary with just over 600 residents.

The history of the village goes back to the early times, to which the findings found in the neighborhood are referred to by Avar, Celtic and Roman. The first written records are from 1213 and the name of Mica refer to the village.

In the 1554 Turkish tax department it was listed in the form of Miske. At that time only five houses were recorded.

Over time, the village which in 1745 became the possession of the Somssich family, was completely unpopulated. In the 19th century, the village was established by two people and a Hungarian family was established.

In the 19th century, Mike's 1290 inhabitants were 997 German speaking. In the first decades of the 20th century, the population approached two thousand. The first world war demanded 35 victims, the second 88.

The village received an independent administration in 1950, and a municipal council was established.
