= Szilvásszentmárton =

- Village
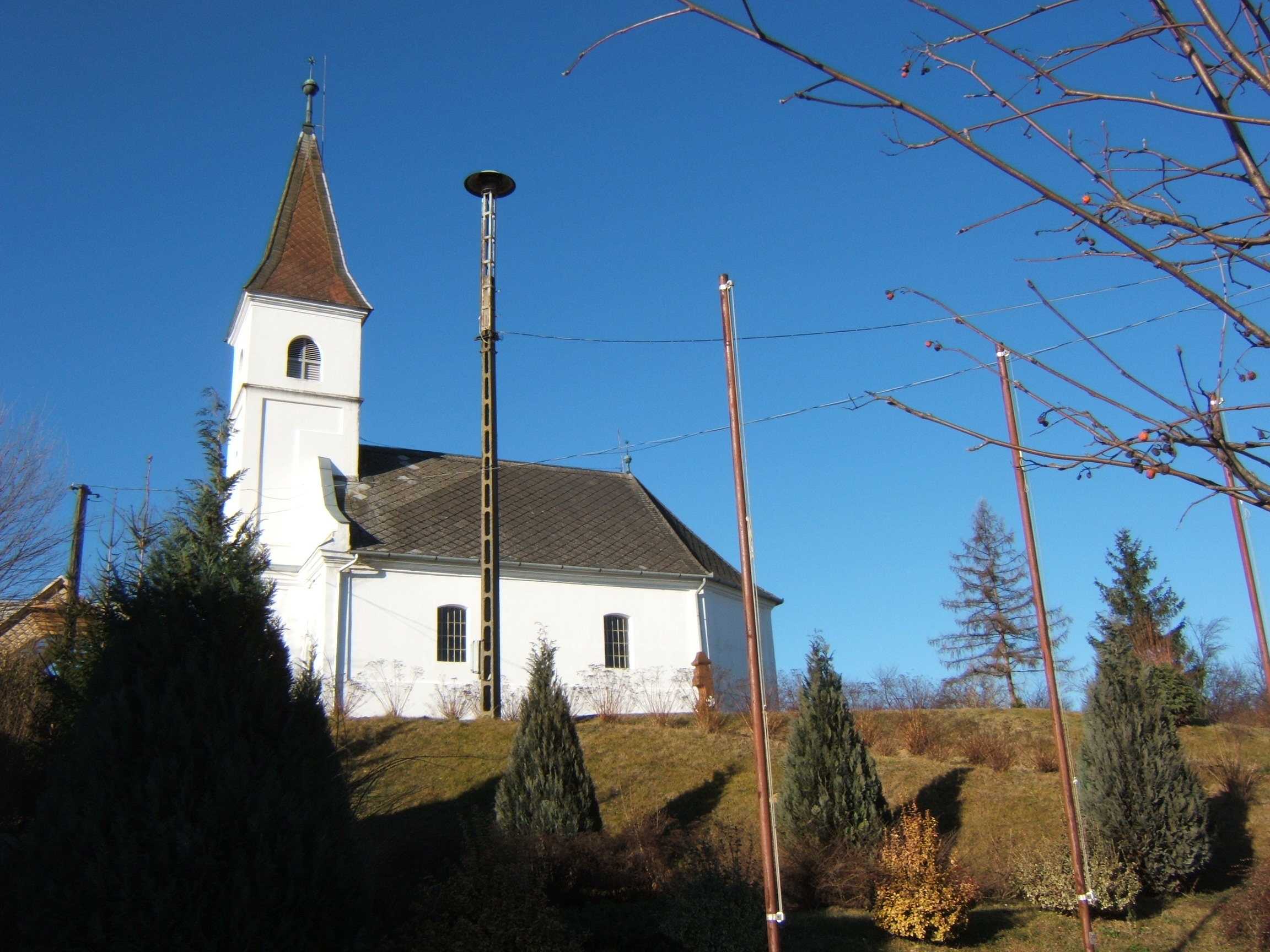
- Reformed Church of Szilvásszentmártom

- Coat of arms

- Location of Somogy county in Hungary

- Location of Szilvásszentmárton
- Coordinates: 46.26941°N 17.72330°E
- Country: Hungary
- Region: Southern Transdanubia
- County: Somogy
- District: Kaposvár
- RC Diocese: Kaposvár

Area
  - Total: 7.08 km^{2} (2.73 sq mi)

Population (2017)
  - Total: 201
  - Density: 28.4/km^{2} (73.5/sq mi)
- Demonym(s): szentmártoni, szilvásszentmártoni
- Time zone: UTC+1 (CET)
  - Summer (DST): UTC+2 (CEST)
- Postal code: 7477
- Area code: (+36) 82
- Patron Saint: Martin of Tours
- NUTS 3 code: HU232
- MP: Attila Gelencsér (Fidesz)
- Website: Szilvásszentmárton Online

Szilvásszentmárton is a village in Somogy county, Hungary.

== Culture ==
The Hungarian folk song Mit mos, Levél Katicája? was collected in 1891 in Szilvásszentmárton by Áron Kiss.
