= Jákó =

- Village
- Coat of arms

- Location of Somogy county in Hungary

- Location of Jákó
- Coordinates: 46.33306°N 17.55437°E
- Country: Hungary
- Region: Southern Transdanubia
- County: Somogy
- District: Kaposvár
- RC Diocese: Kaposvár

Area
  - Total: 16.69 km^{2} (6.44 sq mi)

Population (2017)
  - Total: 628
  - Density: 37.6/km^{2} (97.5/sq mi)
- Demonym: jákói
- Time zone: UTC+1 (CET)
  - Summer (DST): UTC+2 (CEST)
- Postal code: 7525
- Area code: (+36) 82
- NUTS 3 code: HU232
- MP: László Szászfalvi (KDNP)
- Website: Jákó Online

Jákó is a village in Somogy county, Hungary.

== History ==
According to László Szita the settlement was completely Hungarian in the 18th century.
