= Patca =

- Village
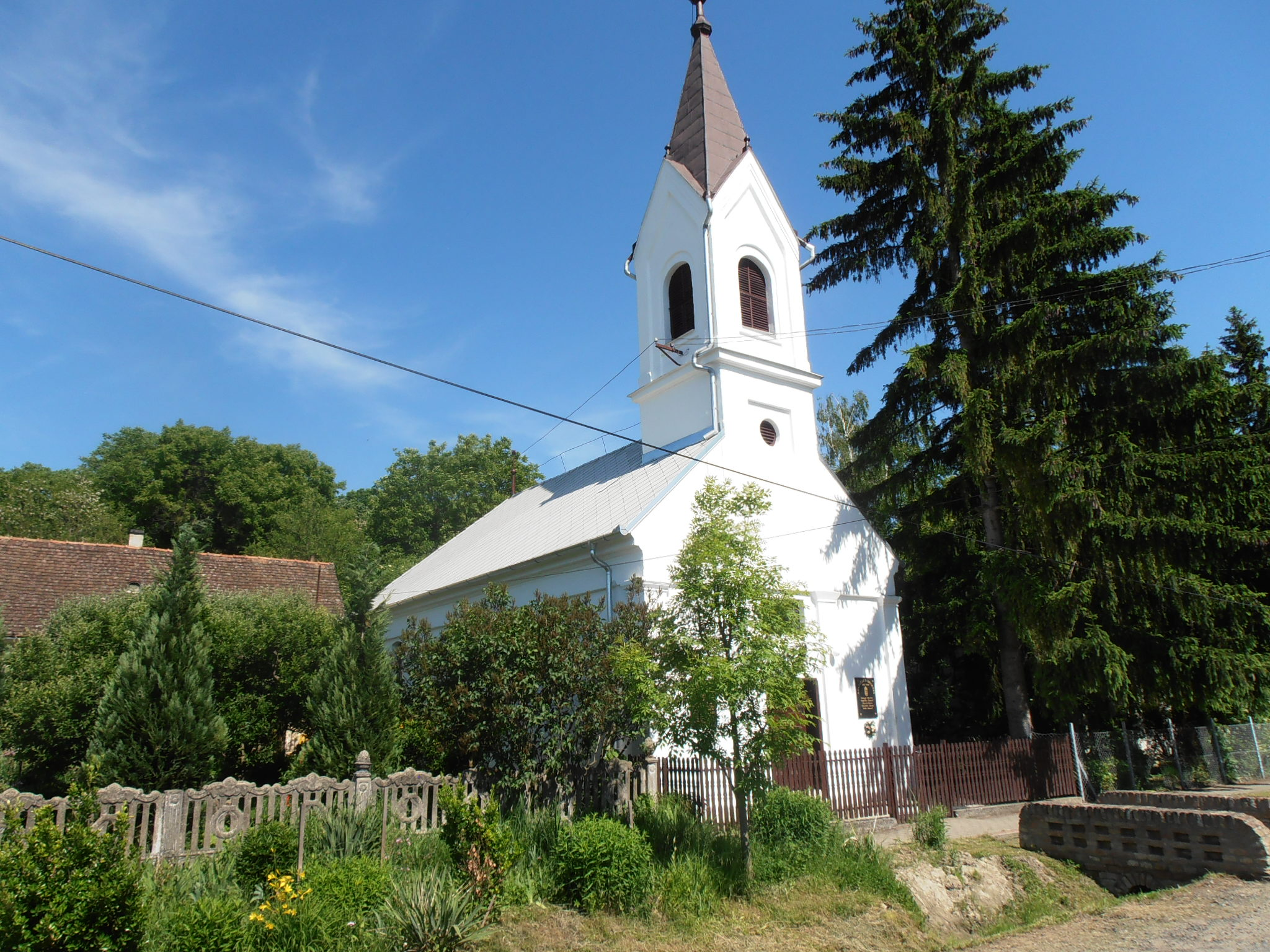
- Reformed Church of Patca

- Coat of arms

- Location of Somogy county in Hungary

- Location of Patca
- Coordinates: 46.28337°N 17.72324°E
- Country: Hungary
- Region: Southern Transdanubia
- County: Somogy
- District: Kaposvár
- RC Diocese: Kaposvár

Area
  - Total: 4.96 km^{2} (1.92 sq mi)

Population (2017)
  - Total: 64
  - Density: 13/km^{2} (33/sq mi)
- Demonym: patcai
- Time zone: UTC+1 (CET)
  - Summer (DST): UTC+2 (CEST)
- Postal code: 7477
- Area code: (+36) 82
- NUTS 3 code: HU232
- MP: Attila Gelencsér (Fidesz)
- Website: Patca Online

Patca is a village in Somogy county, Hungary.
