= Somogygeszti =

- Village
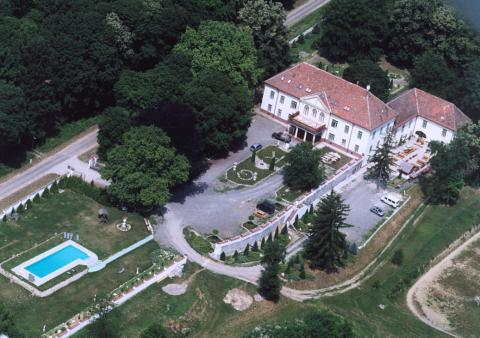
- Jankovich-Bésán Mansion in Somogygeszti

- Location of Somogy county in Hungary

- Location of Somogygeszti
- Coordinates: 46.52205°N 17.78096°E
- Country: Hungary
- Region: Southern Transdanubia
- County: Somogy
- District: Kaposvár
- RC Diocese: Kaposvár

Area
  - Total: 21.71 km^{2} (8.38 sq mi)

Population (2017)
  - Total: 414
  - Density: 19.1/km^{2} (49.4/sq mi)
- Demonym(s): geszti, somogygeszti
- Time zone: UTC+1 (CET)
  - Summer (DST): UTC+2 (CEST)
- Postal code: 7455
- Area code: (+36) 82
- NUTS 3 code: HU232
- MP: József Attila Móring (KDNP)
- Website: Somogygeszti Online

Somogygeszti is a village in Somogy county, Hungary. It dates back to 1302 when the village was called Geszte. The name of the settlement was derived from the Hungarian word "Gesztenye" which means chestnut, due to the large number of chestnut trees in the area.

The surrounding countryside of Somogygeszti is used predominantly for agriculture. A central landmark in the village is the former Jankovich-Bésan mansion built c. 1725. Following extensive restoration, the mansion was renamed Gesztenye Kastélyhotel (Chestnut Castle Hotel) and became a fully functioning hotel in May 2002. The garden and the building itself have been declared a nature conservation area and they are part of the National Heritage Trust.
