= Szőlősgyörök =

Szőlősgyörök Ćorka (in Croatian)
- Village
- Coat of arms

- Location of Somogy county in Hungary

- Location of Szőlősgyörök
- Coordinates: 46.71098°N 17.67475°E
- Country: Hungary
- Region: Southern Transdanubia
- County: Somogy
- District: Fonyód
- RC Diocese: Kaposvár

Area
  - Total: 18.63 km^{2} (7.19 sq mi)

Population (2017)
  - Total: 1,192
  - Density: 63.98/km^{2} (165.7/sq mi)
- Demonym: szőlösgyöröki
- Time zone: UTC+1 (CET)
  - Summer (DST): UTC+2 (CEST)
- Postal code: 8692
- Area code: (+36) 85
- NUTS 3 code: HU232
- MP: József Attila Móring (KDNP)
- Website: Szőlősgyörök Online

Szőlősgyörök (Croatian: Ćorka) is a village in Somogy county, Hungary.

The settlement is part of the Balatonboglár wine region.

== History ==
According to László Szita the settlement was completely Hungarian in the 18th century.
