= Kisasszond =

Kisasszond Gospodince (in Croatian)
- Village
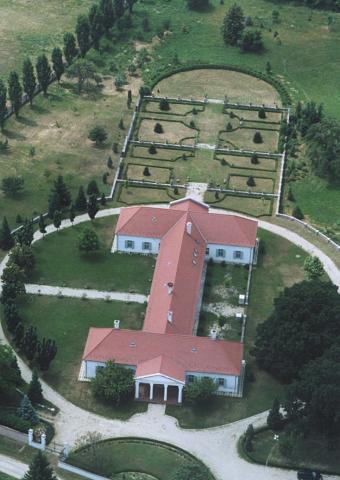
- Sárközy Castle in Kisasszond

- Coat of arms

- Location of Somogy county in Hungary

- Location of Kisasszond
- Coordinates: 46.330833°N 17.641389°E
- Country: Hungary
- Region: Southern Transdanubia
- County: Somogy
- District: Kaposvár
- RC Diocese: Kaposvár

Area
  - Total: 7.84 km^{2} (3.03 sq mi)

Population (2017)
  - Total: 169
  - Density: 21.6/km^{2} (55.8/sq mi)
- Demonym: kisasszondi
- Time zone: UTC+1 (CET)
  - Summer (DST): UTC+2 (CEST)
- Postal code: 7523
- Area code: (+36) 82
- NUTS 3 code: HU232
- MP: László Szászfalvi (KDNP)

Kisasszond (Croatian: Gospodince) is a village in Somogy county, Hungary.

== Etymology ==
According to the local legends its name came from the nuns of the monastery that stood there in the Middle Ages. Others state that it got its name from Katalin Bethlen who was the owner of Kisasszond and died as a young girl. The older version of the name of the settlement was Kisasszonyfalva (English: Mistress village). The church of Kisasszond was dedicated to Holy Mary. Kisasszony (English: Mistress) is one of her titles which got a suffix -d like many other settlements in Hungary.

== History ==
According to László Szita the settlement was completely Hungarian in the 18th century.
