= Hencse =

- Village
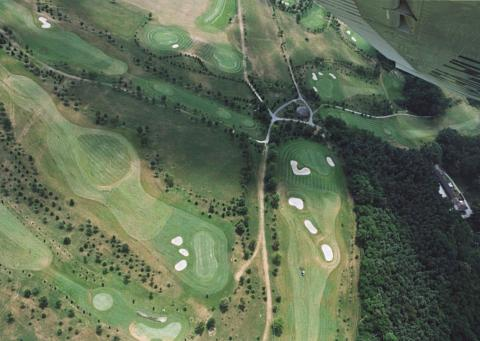
- Hencse National Golf & Country Club

- Coat of arms

- Location of Somogy county in Hungary

- Location of Hencse
- Coordinates: 46.2008°N 17.62636°E
- Country: Hungary
- Region: Southern Transdanubia
- County: Somogy
- District: Kaposvár
- RC Diocese: Kaposvár

Area
  - Total: 7.11 km^{2} (2.75 sq mi)

Population (2017)
  - Total: 320
  - Density: 45/km^{2} (120/sq mi)
- Demonym: hencsei
- Time zone: UTC+1 (CET)
  - Summer (DST): UTC+2 (CEST)
- Postal code: 7532
- Area code: (+36) 82
- NUTS 3 code: HU232
- MP: László Szászfalvi (KDNP)

Hencse is a village in Somogy county, Hungary.

== History ==
According to László Szita the settlement was completely Hungarian in the 18th century.
