= Csombárd =

- Village
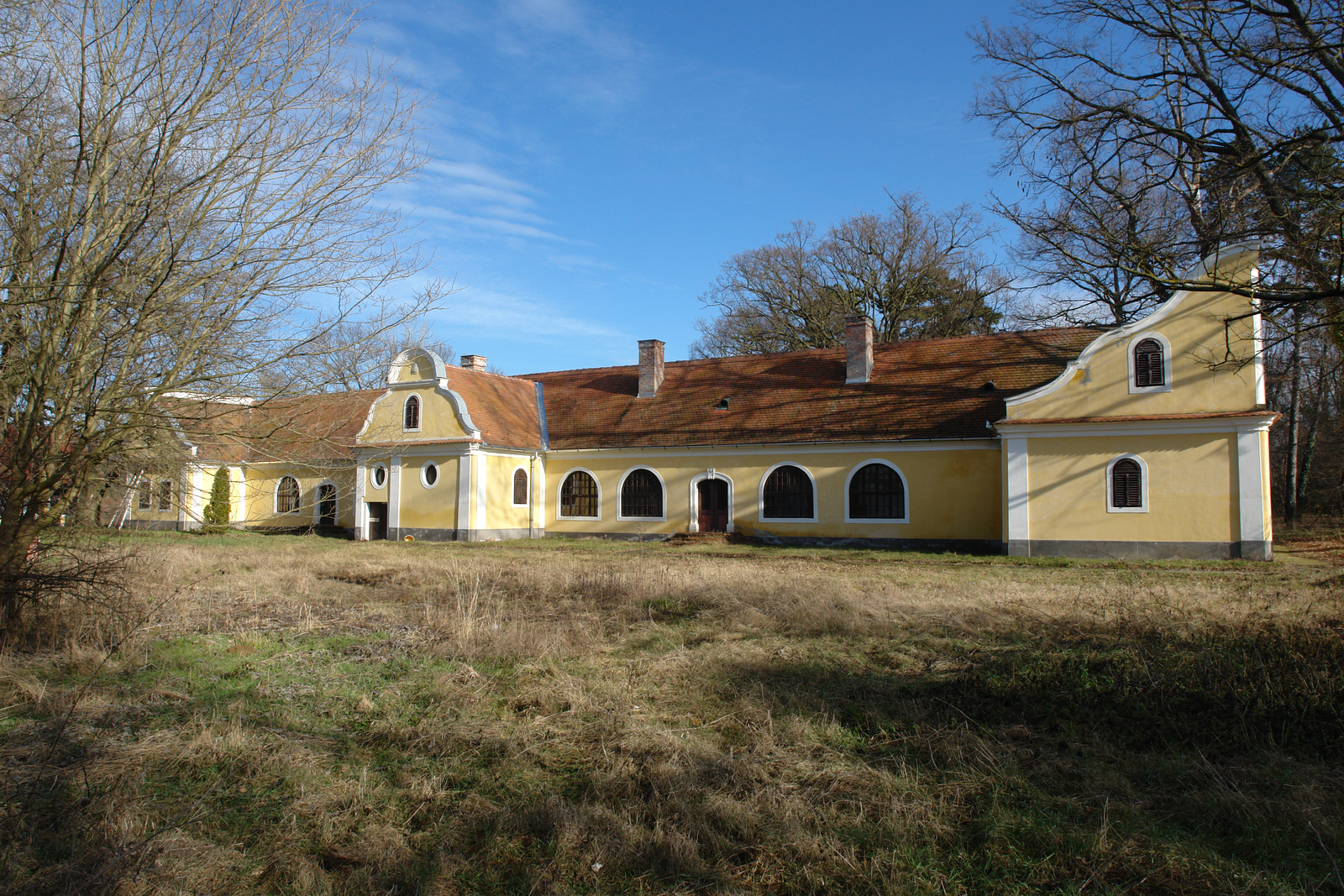
- Pongrácz Mansion in Csombárd

- Coat of arms

- Location of Somogy county in Hungary

- Location of Csombárd
- Coordinates: 46.45257°N 17.67155°E
- Country: Hungary
- Region: Southern Transdanubia
- County: Somogy
- District: Kaposvár
- RC Diocese: Kaposvár

Area
  - Total: 8.99 km^{2} (3.47 sq mi)

Population (2017)
  - Total: 251
  - Density: 27.9/km^{2} (72.3/sq mi)
- Demonym: csombárdi
- Time zone: UTC+1 (CET)
  - Summer (DST): UTC+2 (CEST)
- Postal code: 7432
- Area code: (+36) 82
- NUTS 3 code: HU232
- MP: József Attila Móring (KDNP)
- Website: Csombárd Online

Csombárd is a village in Somogy county, Hungary.
