= Várda =

- Village
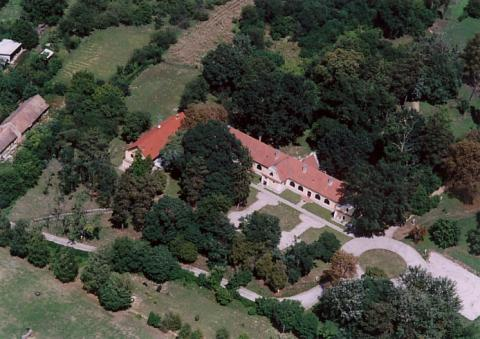
- Somssich-Matulay Mansion in Várda

- Location of Somogy county in Hungary

- Location of Várda
- Coordinates: 46.46202°N 17.74252°E
- Country: Hungary
- Region: Southern Transdanubia
- County: Somogy
- District: Kaposvár
- RC Diocese: Kaposvár

Area
  - Total: 10.36 km^{2} (4.00 sq mi)

Population (2017)
  - Total: 459
  - Density: 44.3/km^{2} (115/sq mi)
- Demonym: várdai
- Time zone: UTC+1 (CET)
  - Summer (DST): UTC+2 (CEST)
- Postal code: 7442
- Area code: (+36) 82
- NUTS 3 code: HU232
- MP: József Attila Móring (KDNP)
- Website: Várda Online

Várda is a village in Somogy county, Hungary.

== History and Etymology ==
Várda was first mentioned in historical records in 1284 as a wilderness protected estate. By the 14th century, it had developed a parish. The name Várda likely comes from the Hungarian word vár meaning “castle” or “fort,” with the suffix -da suggesting a place related to it, perhaps connotating “place of the fort.”

== Demographics ==
As of 2022, the population of Várda was 416. The general distribution towards males and females were 55% females and 45% males.

Year	1980	1990	2001	2011	2022
Population	603	542	551	455	416

== Notable people ==
- Endre Szász, a prominent Hungarian artist who lived and worked in Várda.
