= Magyaratád =

- Village
- Coat of arms

- Location of Somogy county in Hungary

- Location of Magyaratád
- Coordinates: 46.46790°N 17.90265°E
- Country: Hungary
- Region: Southern Transdanubia
- County: Somogy
- District: Kaposvár
- RC Diocese: Kaposvár

Area
  - Total: 18.82 km^{2} (7.27 sq mi)

Population (2017)
  - Total: 758
  - Density: 40.3/km^{2} (104/sq mi)
- Demonym: magyaratádi
- Time zone: UTC+1 (CET)
  - Summer (DST): UTC+2 (CEST)
- Postal code: 7463
- Area code: (+36) 82
- NUTS 3 code: HU232
- MP: Mihály Witzmann (Fidesz)
- Website: Magyaratád Online

Magyaratád is a small village in Somogy county, Hungary.
