= Baté =

- Village
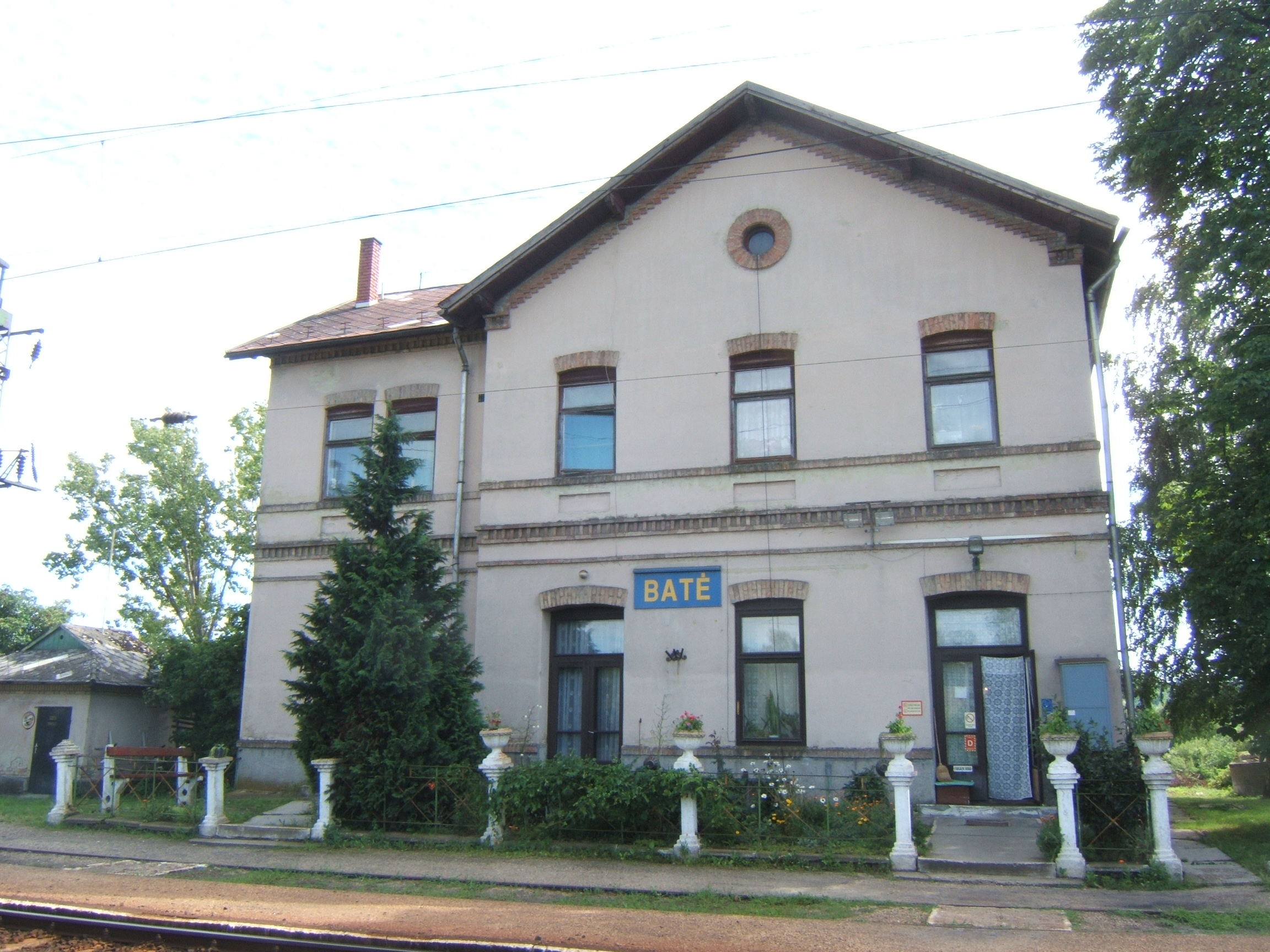
- Railway station in Baté

- Coat of arms

- Location of Baté
- Coordinates: 46.35961°N 17.96491°E
- Country: Hungary
- Region: Southern Transdanubia
- County: Somogy
- District: Kaposvár
- RC Diocese: Kaposvár

Area
  - Total: 10.28 km^{2} (3.97 sq mi)

Population (2017)
  - Total: 794
  - Density: 77.2/km^{2} (200/sq mi)
- Demonym: batéi
- Time zone: UTC+1 (CET)
  - Summer (DST): UTC+2 (CEST)
- Postal code: 7258
- Area code: (+36) 82
- NUTS 3 code: HU232
- MP: Mihály Witzmann (Fidesz)
- Website: Baté Online

Baté is a village in Somogy county, Hungary.
