= Somodor =

- Village
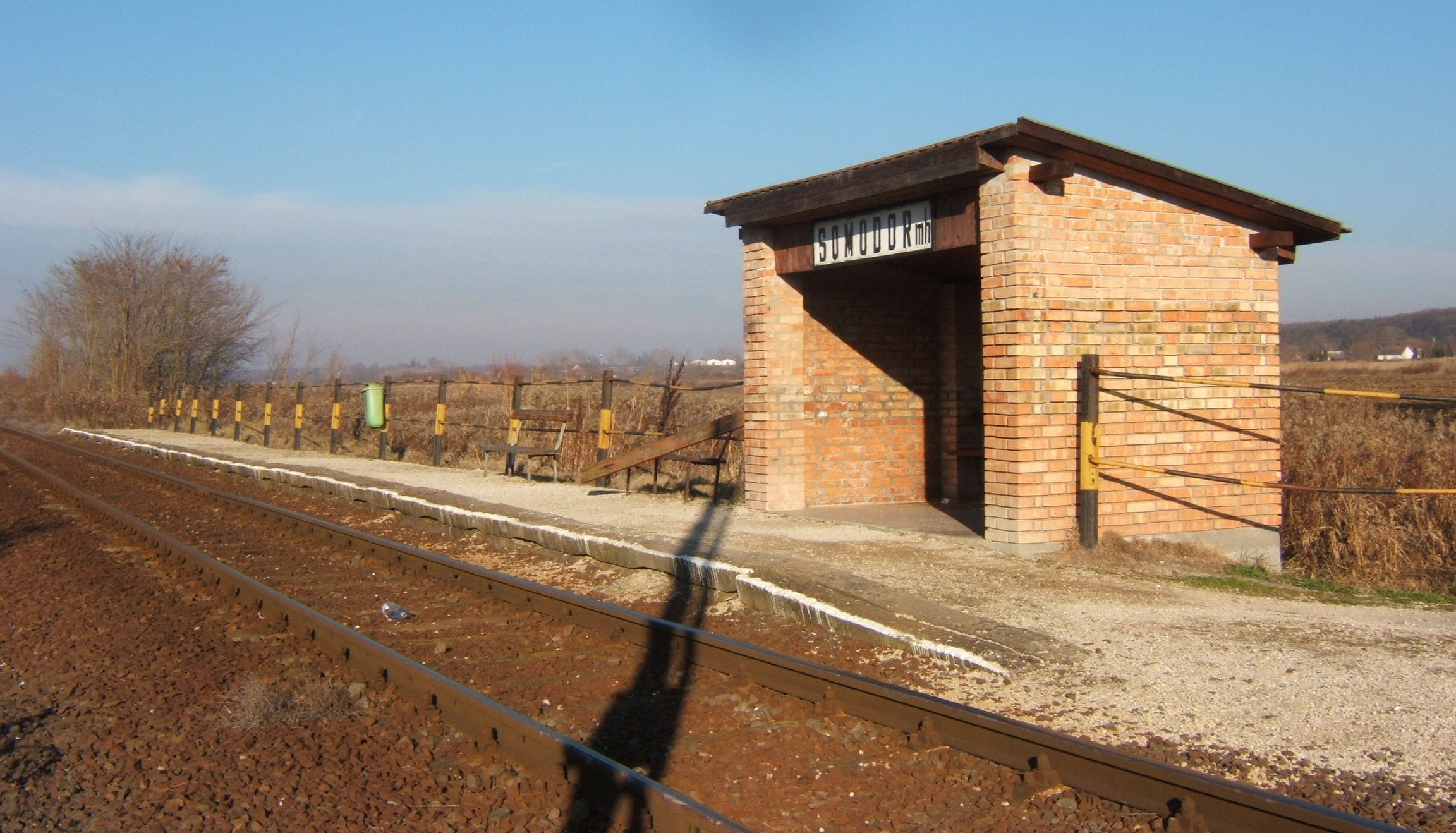
- Train station of Somodor

- Coat of arms

- Location of Somogy county in Hungary

- Location of Somodor
- Coordinates: 46.47530°N 17.84323°E
- Country: Hungary
- Region: Southern Transdanubia
- County: Somogy
- District: Kaposvár
- RC Diocese: Kaposvár

Area
  - Total: 19.91 km^{2} (7.69 sq mi)

Population (2017)
  - Total: 364
  - Density: 18.3/km^{2} (47.4/sq mi)
- Demonym: somodori
- Time zone: UTC+1 (CET)
  - Summer (DST): UTC+2 (CEST)
- Postal code: 7454
- Area code: (+36) 82
- NUTS 3 code: HU232
- MP: Mihály Witzmann (Fidesz)
- Website: Somodor Online

Somodor is a village in Somogy county, Hungary.

== History ==
According to László Szita the settlement was completely Hungarian in the 18th century.
