= Zselicszentpál =

- Village
- Location of Somogy county in Hungary

- Location of Zselicszentpál
- Coordinates: 46.30804°N 17.82166°E
- Country: Hungary
- Region: Southern Transdanubia
- County: Somogy
- District: Kaposvár
- RC Diocese: Kaposvár

Area
  - Total: 10.35 km^{2} (4.00 sq mi)

Population (2017)
  - Total: 398
  - Density: 38.5/km^{2} (99.6/sq mi)
- Demonym(s): szentpáli, zselicszentpáli
- Time zone: UTC+1 (CET)
  - Summer (DST): UTC+2 (CEST)
- Postal code: 7474
- Area code: (+36) 82
- NUTS 3 code: HU232
- MP: Attila Gelencsér (Fidesz)
- Website: Zselicszentpál Online

Zselicszentpál is a village in Somogy county, Hungary.
