= Hetes =

- Village
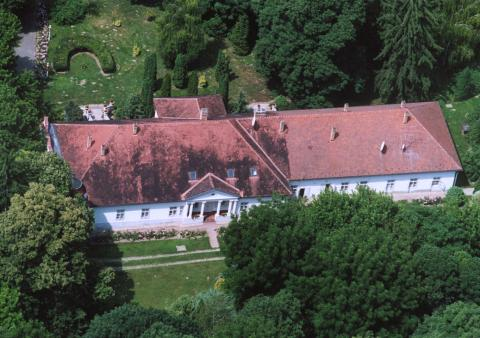
- Somssich Mansion in Hetes

- Coat of arms

- Location of Somogy county in Hungary

- Location of Hetes
- Coordinates: 46.42168°N 17.69285°E
- Country: Hungary
- Region: Southern Transdanubia
- County: Somogy
- District: Kaposvár
- RC Diocese: Kaposvár

Area
  - Total: 26.63 km^{2} (10.28 sq mi)

Population (2017)
  - Total: 1,207
  - Density: 45.32/km^{2} (117.4/sq mi)
- Demonym: hetesi
- Time zone: UTC+1 (CET)
  - Summer (DST): UTC+2 (CEST)
- Postal code: 7432
- Area code: (+36) 82
- NUTS 3 code: HU232
- MP: József Attila Móring (KDNP)
- Website: Hetes Online

Hetes is a village in Somogy county, Hungary.

== Etymology ==
According to legends its name came from the word hetes (English: seven) referring to seven houses of the village.
