= Zselickislak =

- Village
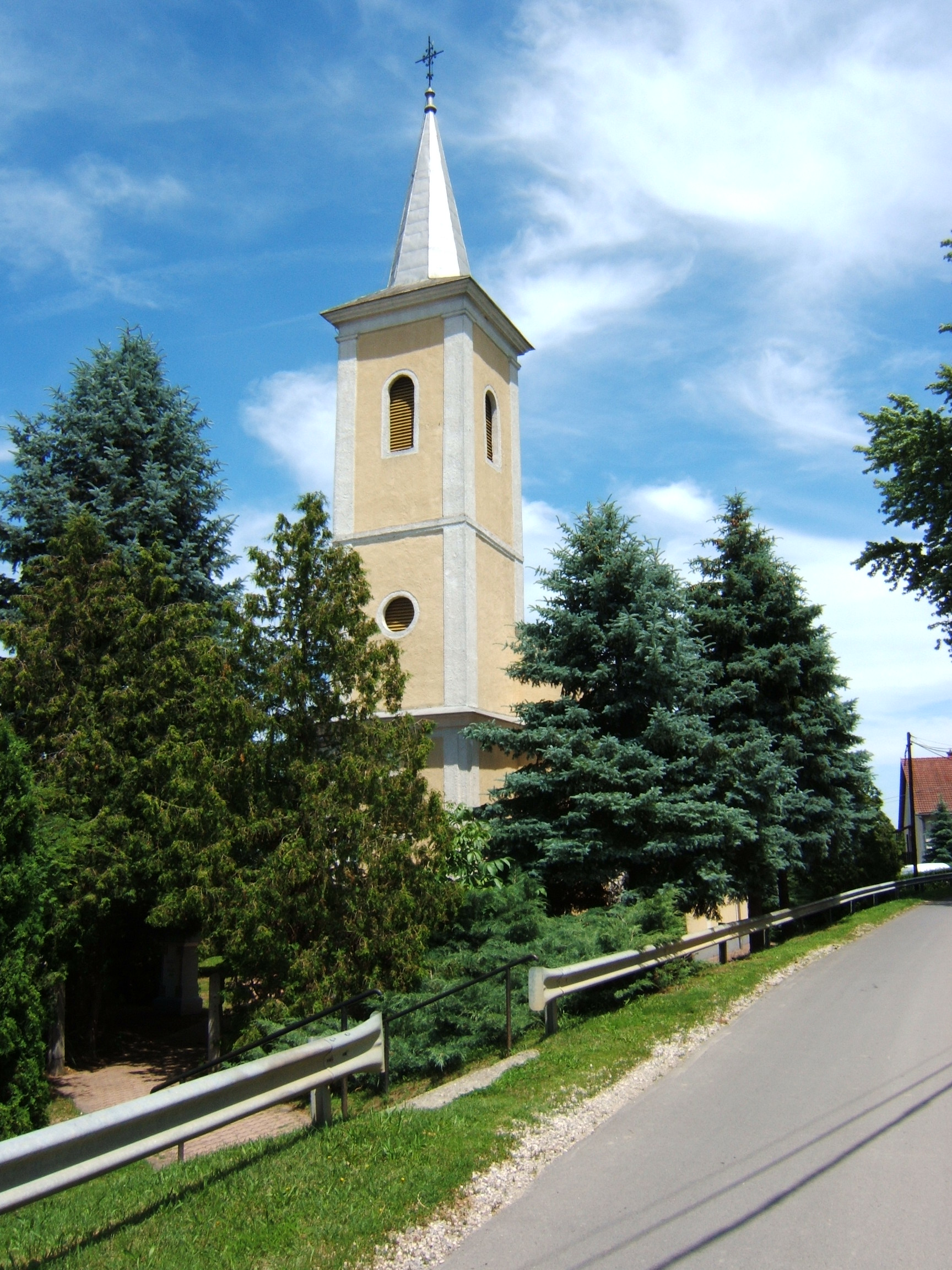
- Saint Stephen of Hungary Church (built in 1890) in Zselickislak

- Location of Somogy county in Hungary

- Location of Zselickislak
- Coordinates: 46.31415°N 17.79740°E
- Country: Hungary
- Region: Southern Transdanubia
- County: Somogy
- District: Kaposvár
- RC Diocese: Kaposvár

Area
  - Total: 10.39 km^{2} (4.01 sq mi)

Population (2017)
  - Total: 367
  - Density: 35.3/km^{2} (91.5/sq mi)
- Demonym: zselickislaki
- Time zone: UTC+1 (CET)
  - Summer (DST): UTC+2 (CEST)
- Postal code: 7400
- Area code: (+36) 82
- Patron Saint: Stephen I
- NUTS 3 code: HU232
- MP: Attila Gelencsér (Fidesz)
- Website: Zselickislak Online

Zselickislak is a village in Somogy county, Hungary.
