= Büssü =

- Village
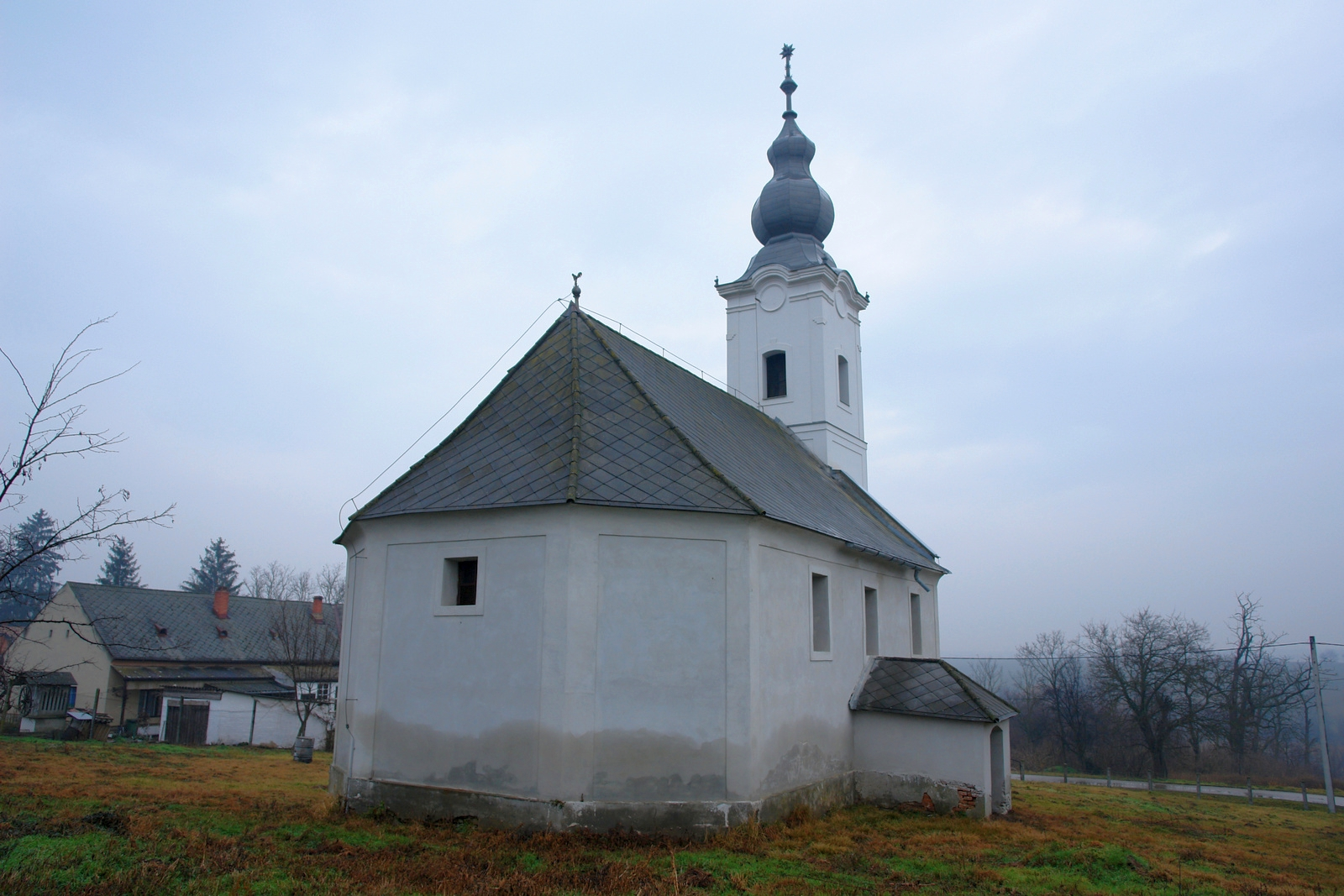
- Reformed Church of Büssü

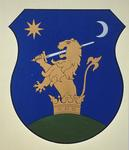
- Coat of arms

- Location of Somogy county in Hungary

- Location of Büssü
- Coordinates: 46.45746°N 17.96307°E
- Country: Hungary
- Region: Southern Transdanubia
- County: Somogy
- District: Kaposvár
- RC Diocese: Kaposvár

Area
  - Total: 17.19 km^{2} (6.64 sq mi)

Population (2017)
  - Total: 406
- Time zone: UTC+1 (CET)
  - Summer (DST): UTC+2 (CEST)
- Postal code: 7273
- Area code: (+36) 82
- NUTS 3 code: HU232
- MP: Mihály Witzmann (Fidesz)
- Website: Büssü Online

Büssü (Hungarian pronunciation: [ˈbyʃːy]) is a village in Somogy county, Hungary.
