= Mernye =

- Village
- Coat of arms

- Location of Somogy county in Hungary

- Location of Mernye
- Coordinates: 46.50896°N 17.82444°E
- Country: Hungary
- Region: Southern Transdanubia
- County: Somogy
- District: Kaposvár
- RC Diocese: Kaposvár

Area
  - Total: 25.93 km^{2} (10.01 sq mi)

Population (2017)
  - Total: 1,265
  - Density: 48.79/km^{2} (126.4/sq mi)
- Demonym: mernyei
- Time zone: UTC+1 (CET)
  - Summer (DST): UTC+2 (CEST)
- Postal code: 7453
- Area code: (+36) 82
- NUTS 3 code: HU232
- MP: Mihály Witzmann (Fidesz)
- Website: Mernye Online

Mernye is a village in Somogy county, Hungary.

It is located in southern Hungary, in Somogy County, not far from Lake Balaton.
