= Szentgáloskér =

- Village
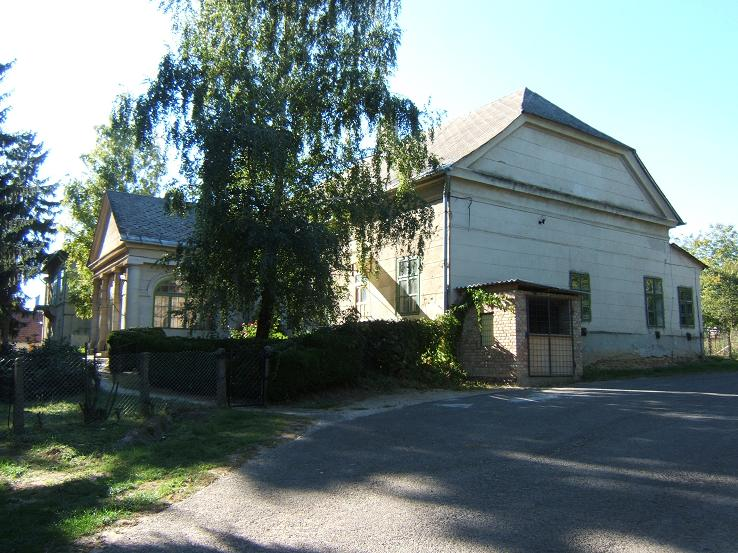
- Svastics-Kladnigg Mansion in Szentgáloskér

- Coat of arms

- Location of Somogy county in Hungary

- Location of Szentgáloskér
- Coordinates: 46.50490°N 17.88154°E
- Country: Hungary
- Region: Southern Transdanubia
- County: Somogy
- District: Kaposvár
- RC Diocese: Kaposvár

Area
  - Total: 27.25 km^{2} (10.52 sq mi)

Population (2017)
  - Total: 495
  - Density: 18.2/km^{2} (47.0/sq mi)
- Demonym(s): gáloskéri, szentgáloskéri
- Time zone: UTC+1 (CET)
  - Summer (DST): UTC+2 (CEST)
- Postal code: 7465
- Area code: (+36) 82
- NUTS 3 code: HU232
- MP: Mihály Witzmann (Fidesz)
- Website: Szentgáloskér Online

Szentgáloskér is a village in Somogy county, Hungary.
