= Osztopán =

Osztopán Stupan (in Croatian)
- Village
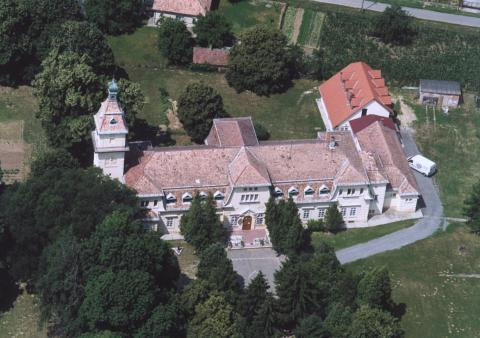
- Tallián Mansion in Osztopán

- Coat of arms

- Location of Somogy county in Hungary

- Location of Osztopán
- Coordinates: 46.52032°N 17.67068°E
- Country: Hungary
- Region: Southern Transdanubia
- County: Somogy
- District: Kaposvár
- RC Diocese: Kaposvár

Area
  - Total: 22.83 km^{2} (8.81 sq mi)

Population (2017)
  - Total: 824
  - Density: 36.1/km^{2} (93.5/sq mi)
- Demonym: osztopáni
- Time zone: UTC+1 (CET)
  - Summer (DST): UTC+2 (CEST)
- Postal code: 7444
- Area code: (+36) 82
- NUTS 3 code: HU232
- MP: József Attila Móring (KDNP)
- Website: Osztopán Online

Osztopán (Croatian: Stupan) is a village in Somogy county, Hungary.

== Etymology ==
The name comes from the Slavic Stupan derived from the Proto-Slavic stem stǫp- with several meanings and possible etymologies (i.e. stǫpa/stupa: trapping pit, see also the etymology of Stupava).

== History ==
According to László Szita the settlement was completely Hungarian in the 18th century.

Highway bridge bombed by 97th BG on 30 June 1944 when primary target Blechammer oil refinery was overcast.

== Culture ==
The Hungarian folk song Osztopáni malomárok was collected in Osztopán in 1949 by Ferenc Gönczi.
