= Patalom =

- Village
- Coat of arms

- Location of Somogy county in Hungary

- Location of Patalom
- Coordinates: 46.44973°N 17.92315°E
- Country: Hungary
- Region: Southern Transdanubia
- County: Somogy
- District: Kaposvár
- RC Diocese: Kaposvár

Area
  - Total: 6.68 km^{2} (2.58 sq mi)

Population (2017)
  - Total: 320
  - Density: 48/km^{2} (120/sq mi)
- Demonym: patalomi
- Time zone: UTC+1 (CET)
  - Summer (DST): UTC+2 (CEST)
- Postal code: 7463
- Area code: (+36) 82
- NUTS 3 code: HU232
- MP: Mihály Witzmann (Fidesz)
- Website: Patalom Online

Patalom is a village in Somogy County, Hungary.
