= Újvárfalva =

- Village
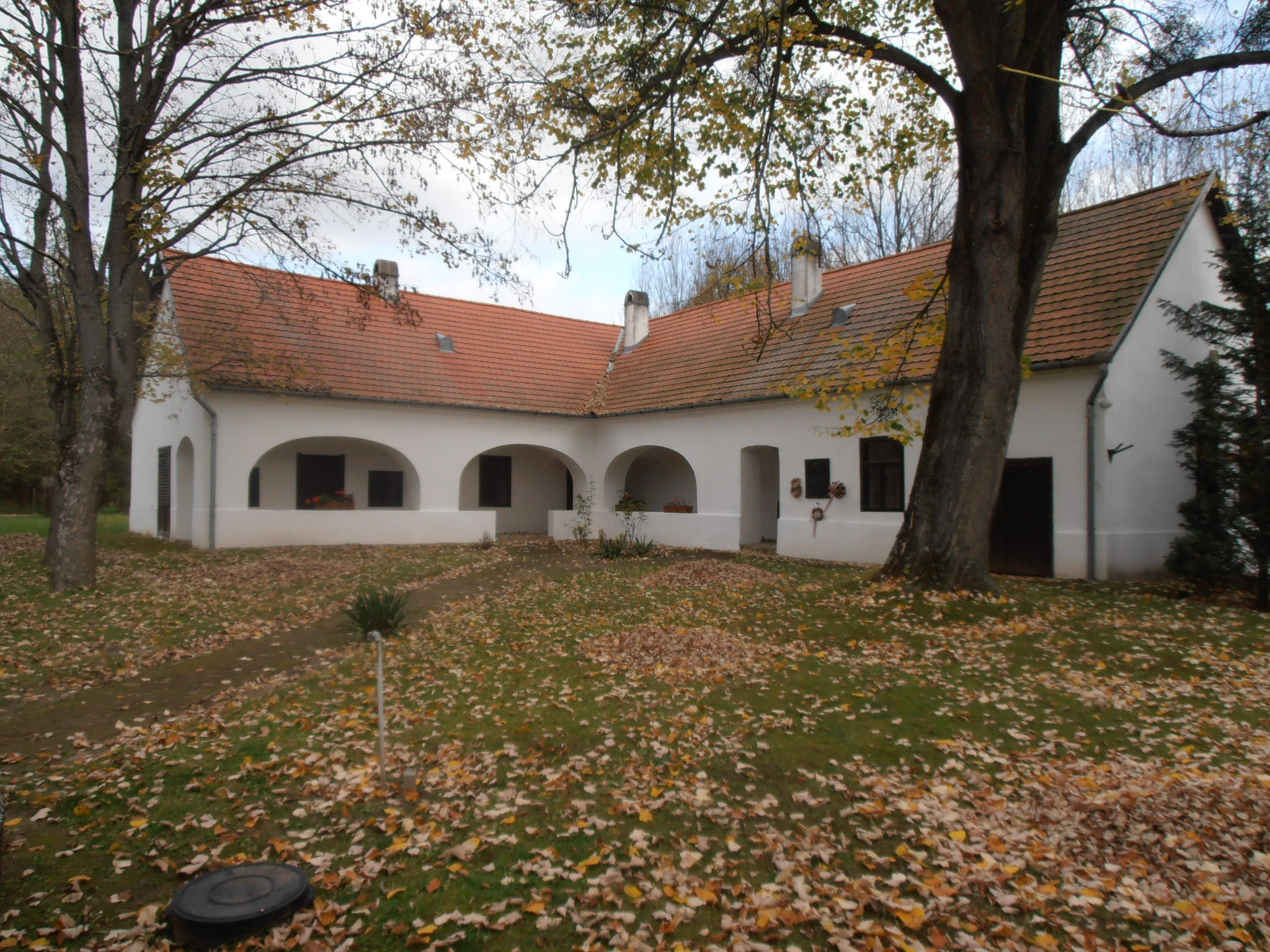
- Noszlopy Mansion in Újvárfalva

- Location of Somogy county in Hungary

- Location of Újvárfalva
- Coordinates: 46.42911°N 17.57367°E
- Country: Hungary
- Region: Southern Transdanubia
- County: Somogy
- District: Kaposvár
- RC Diocese: Kaposvár

Area
  - Total: 12.22 km^{2} (4.72 sq mi)

Population (2017)
  - Total: 290
  - Density: 24/km^{2} (61/sq mi)
- Demonym(s): újvárfalvai, újvárfalusi
- Time zone: UTC+1 (CET)
  - Summer (DST): UTC+2 (CEST)
- Postal code: 7436
- Area code: (+36) 82
- NUTS 3 code: HU232
- MP: József Attila Móring (KDNP)
- Website: Újvárfalva Online

Újvárfalva is a village in Somogy county, Hungary.
