= Kisgyalán =

- Village
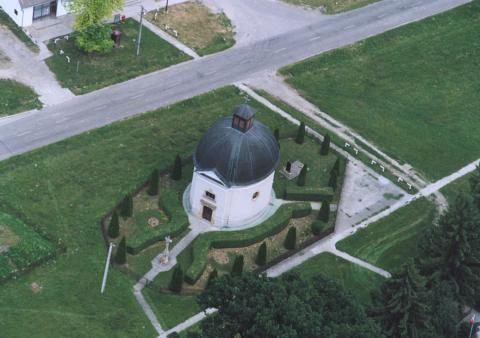
- Roman Catholic Round Chapel

- Location of Somogy county in Hungary

- Location of Kisgyalán
- Coordinates: 46.42287°N 17.97589°E
- Country: Hungary
- Region: Southern Transdanubia
- County: Somogy
- District: Kaposvár
- RC Diocese: Kaposvár

Area
  - Total: 9.41 km^{2} (3.63 sq mi)

Population (2017)
  - Total: 190
  - Density: 20/km^{2} (52/sq mi)
- Demonym: kisgyaláni
- Time zone: UTC+1 (CET)
  - Summer (DST): UTC+2 (CEST)
- Postal code: 7279
- Area code: (+36) 82
- NUTS 3 code: HU232
- MP: Mihály Witzmann (Fidesz)

Kisgyalán is a village in Somogy county, Hungary.
