= Zselickisfalud =

- Village
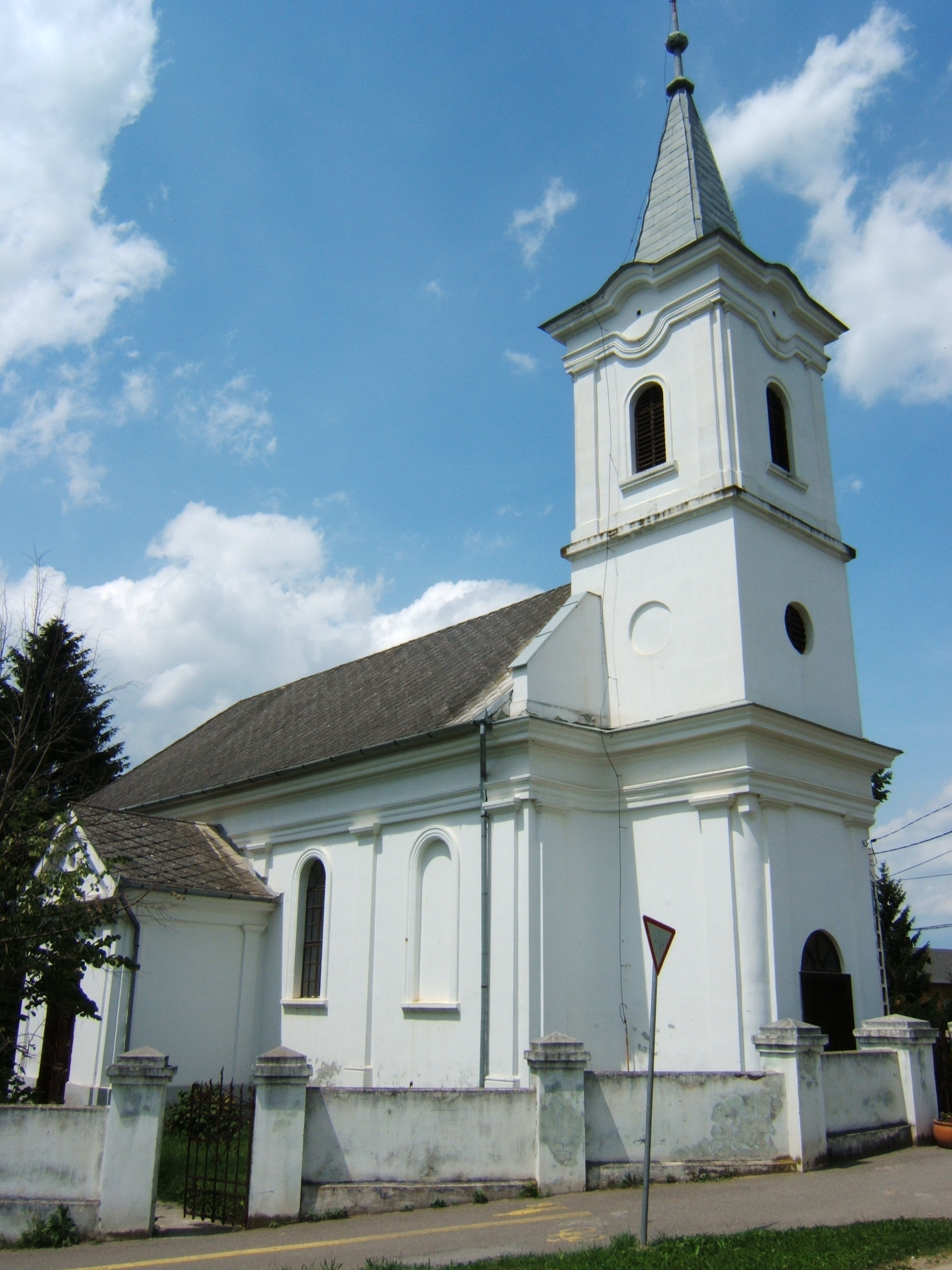
- Reformed Church of Zselickisfalud

- Coat of arms

- Location of Somogy county in Hungary

- Location of Zselickisfalud
- Coordinates: 46.27355°N 17.73481°E
- Country: Hungary
- Region: Southern Transdanubia
- County: Somogy
- District: Kaposvár
- RC Diocese: Kaposvár

Area
  - Total: 26.08 km^{2} (10.07 sq mi)

Population (2017)
  - Total: 233
  - Density: 8.93/km^{2} (23.1/sq mi)
- Demonym: zselickisfaludi
- Time zone: UTC+1 (CET)
  - Summer (DST): UTC+2 (CEST)
- Postal code: 7477
- Area code: (+36) 82
- NUTS 3 code: HU232
- MP: Attila Gelencsér (Fidesz)
- Website: Zselickisfalud Online

Zselickisfalud is a village in Somogy county, Hungary, located approximately 12 km south of Kaposvár.

== History ==
=== Name ===
In 1339, the first mention of Kys Folud, a small settlement in a vast forest, appears. Its inhabitants, through hard work, cleared the area and made the soil fertile with small wooden houses. Despite its size, it lacked a church. The name evolved over the years, and this Kisfalud, located near Boldogasszonyfa and Vásárosbéc, might be the precursor to today's Zselickisfalud. During the Ottoman rule from 1555, including the period when Kaposvár fell, Kisfalud persisted with inhabitants. By 1695, it became a partial property of the Esterházy family and, later, part of their endowment. The Esterházy family retained ownership until nationalization after World War II.

=== History ===
Remains of fortifications from the Hungarian conquest era can be found on Castle Hill to the east of the village. Written records confirm that Zselickisfalud was already inhabited in the 13th century. Beekeeping has been a traditional activity here since ancient times, with former royal beekeepers and herdsmen residing in the area. In medieval times, Márcadópuszta existed within the village's territory, preserving the obligation to pay the March tithe in its name.

The Rákóczi War of Independence began in 1703, leading to the presence of Kuruc hussars on the southern shore of Lake Balaton in the fall, marking the onset of military activities in Somogy County. In 1704, Austrians released Serbs onto the county to counter the Kurucs, resulting in severe devastation in the Zselic region.

During the 1715 national census, the village had 10 households, and in 1720, it had 14 households under the ownership of Count Esterházy József. Emperor Joseph II's decree in 1784-1787 mandated a census, which recorded 476 inhabitants in Zselickisfalud. The 1848 revolution led to the liberation of 52 serf households, 1 tenant household, and 2 landless serf households in the village.

The first World War took a toll on peasant farms, producing numerous casualties and prisoners of war. Zselickisfalud sent 280 soldiers to the war, with 16 war widows and 3 war orphans recorded. Economic organizations formed before the turn of the century, such as the Zselickisfalud–Szilvásszentmárton–Patca Cooperative Credit Union, joined by the Hangya Consumer and Sales Cooperative in 1920. Common associations included the Farmers' Circle, Civil Marksman Association, and Levente Association.

Soviet forces occupied the village on December 2, 1944. Agricultural cooperatives emerged in the early 1950s, and the New Life Agricultural Cooperative operated from 1952 to 1956. After the 1956 revolution, the cooperative was reorganized, eventually merging with neighboring agricultural enterprises in the early 1970s to form the Zselic Landscape Agricultural Cooperative.

The village had separate Roman Catholic and Protestant elementary schools, each with one teacher and one classroom. Records on the history of the Zselickisfalud Reformed Church date back to the early 18th century when it had a designated preacher. By the 18th century, it likely became a mother church, with Patca and Szilvásszentmárton as its subsidiary churches. The Catholic population began to grow only in the 19th century, and their church was built in 1953.

In 1900, the population was 844, decreasing to 773 by 1910. Population decline accelerated from the 1960s, exacerbated by the centralization of education to Kaposvár. The current population, under 300, has been consistently decreasing since the turn of the century due to migration and the impact of centralization.

Approximately 95% of the village's houses have access to piped drinking water, and over half have telephone connections. One of the community's primary goals is the development of gas and sewage networks. Traditionally, agriculture, forestry, and local industrial enterprises have been the main sources of employment, with many residents commuting to Kaposvár for work. The elementary school students attend school in the neighboring village of Szenna.

The village square (known as Heroes' Square since 2000) houses the village hall, the small office of the Mayor, and the medical room in the old building.

== Geographic Location and Natural Features ==
The village is situated in the Zselic region, part of the Transdanubian Hills, an area of Hungary characterized by rolling hills, steep valleys, and extensive forests.

=== Geography ===
The village's geographical features vary, with elevations ranging from 147 meters to 282 meters above sea level. The highest point is the Barkó Hill (282 meters), located to the east of the village, while the lowest point is in the valley of the Szilvási Stream (147 meters), where the stream exits the village boundary to the north. Despite the predominantly low-lying hills, the landscape often takes on a mountainous character due to its rugged terrain, steep valley slopes, and expansive forested areas.

=== Geology ===
The geological composition of the hilly terrain is characterized by a covering of loess-like sediment, varying in thickness from 3 to 30 meters. This sediment, formed during the Pleistocene epoch under cold-dry climatic conditions, consists of loose deposits transported and deposited by the wind. The higher elevated areas feature various types of brown forest soils, while the wider, moist valley bottoms exhibit meadow soils.

=== Climate ===
Zselickisfalud experiences a moderately warm, moderately humid, and mild-tempered, sub-Mediterranean climate. Compared to the surrounding hills of southern Transdanubia, the Zselic region receives more precipitation, with annual totals reaching or even exceeding 800 millimeters. The precipitation pattern is characterized by a May–June maximum, followed by a second, autumnal rainy period indicative of Mediterranean climatic influences. The average annual temperature ranges from 10 to 10.5 degrees Celsius.

=== Hydrography ===
Within the village borders, an east–west water divide runs. The northern territories drain into the Kapos River, while the southern areas contribute to the Drava River watershed. The water network in the vicinity is dense, but the majority of streams, with their small catchment areas, carry limited water, exhibiting fluctuating flow rates. The Szilvási Stream collects waters to the north, ultimately flowing into the Berki Stream, which later joins the Kapos River. To the south, the Márcadó Stream gathers runoff waters, eventually reaching the Drava River through the Eastern Gyöngyös Stream.

=== Natural Vegetation ===
Human activities have preserved the entirety of the village's territory as forested land. The existing forests are remnants of the original natural vegetation. The predominant forest type in the region is the silver lime-beech forest (Vicio oroboidi-Fagetum), closely related to similar forests native to the western Balkans. This forest type, known for its rich species composition, exhibits the presence of sub-Mediterranean plant species in its understory.

The silver lime-beech forests are sometimes mixed with other forest formations, particularly in cooler valley bottoms, where illyrian hornbeam-oak forests (Helleboro dumetorum-Carpinetum) are found. These forests have a more diverse canopy composition, including sessile oak, hornbeam, silver lime, and pedunculate oak, often intermingled with maple, ash, and other elm species.

A variety of other natural forest formations occupy small areas within the village borders, such as alder groves (Carici pendulae-Alnetum) along perennial watercourses, and oak-elm-elder forests (Knautio drymeiae-Ulmetum) and alder swamp forests (Angelico sylvestri-Alnetum) in slightly widened valley sections. Areas previously cleared for wet forests have been replaced by wet meadows, tall-grass meadows, and marshy meadows as secondary natural vegetation.

=== Land Use ===
Due to the rugged terrain and heavily dissected landscape, intensive agriculture and forestry have been historically limited in Zselickisfalud and its surroundings. The landscape is predominantly characterized by vast, contiguous forests. Over 9,000 hectares of protected natural areas were designated in 1976 as the Zselic National Landscape Protection Area (ZSNLPA). This includes the local "Star Park" (Csillagpark). which received the International Dark Sky Park designation in 2009 due t very low-level light pollution. The observatory itself cannot be visited independently; access is only available through pre-announced guided programs.

A significant portion of the forests and meadows within the Zselickisfalud borders, totaling more than 1,600 hectares, falls under this protection area. The conservation-oriented land use prioritizes the sustainable and harmonious coexistence of humans and their natural environment, favoring traditional, extensive farming practices. The natural environment is conducive to organic farming, pasture-based livestock farming, and recreational tourism.
