= Somogyfajsz =

Somogyfajsz Füssen (in German)
- Village
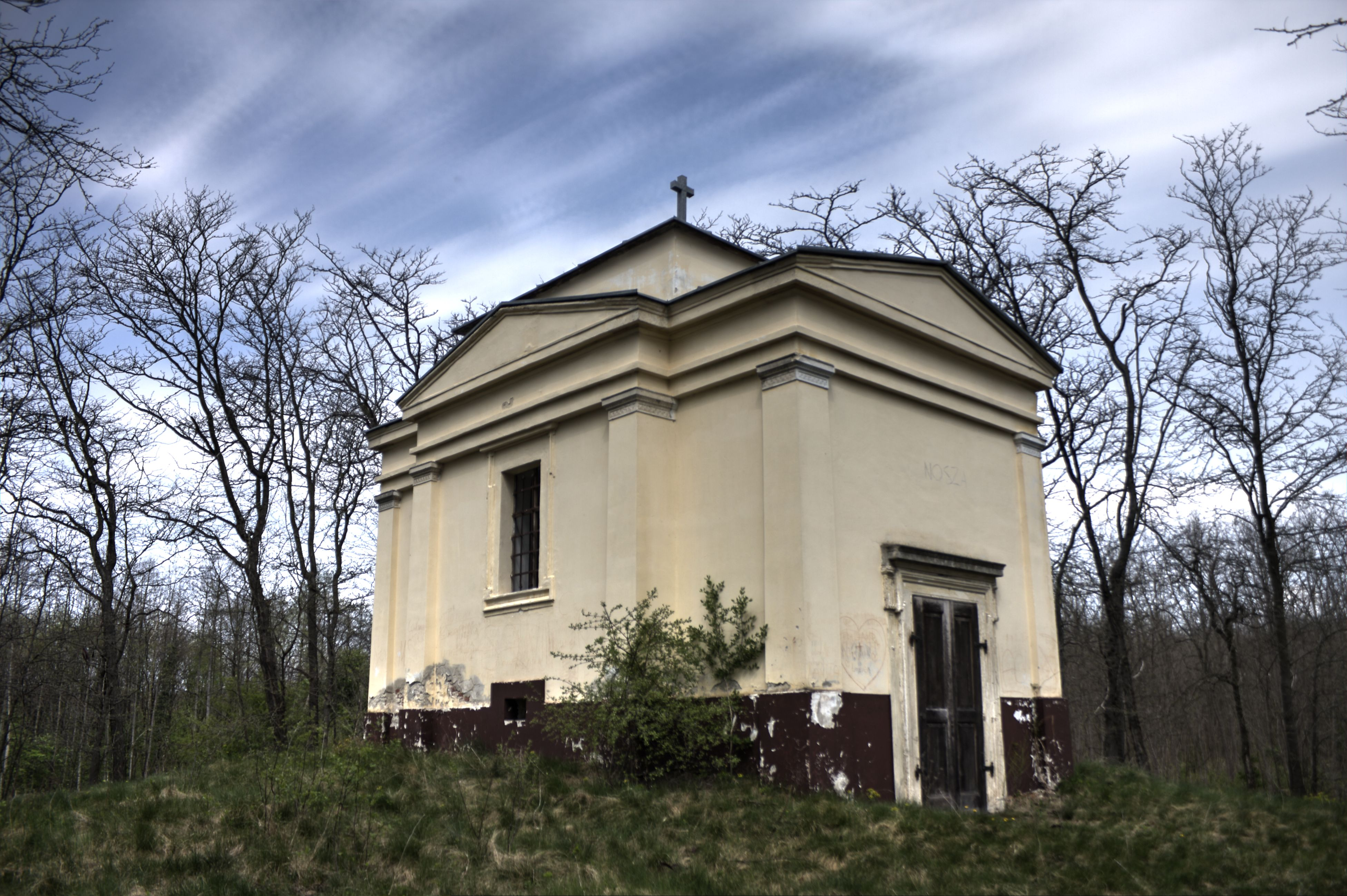
- Saint Wendelin Chapel in Somogyfajsz

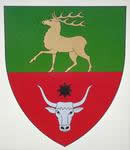
- Coat of arms

- Location of Somogy county in Hungary

- Location of Somogyfajsz
- Coordinates: 46.51028°N 17.57348°E
- Country: Hungary
- Region: Southern Transdanubia
- County: Somogy
- District: Kaposvár
- RC Diocese: Kaposvár

Area
  - Total: 18.26 km^{2} (7.05 sq mi)

Population (2017)
  - Total: 546
  - Density: 29.9/km^{2} (77.4/sq mi)
- Demonym(s): fajszi, somogyfajszi
- Time zone: UTC+1 (CET)
  - Summer (DST): UTC+2 (CEST)
- Postal code: 8708
- Area code: (+36) 85
- NUTS 3 code: HU232
- MP: József Attila Móring (KDNP)
- Website: Somogyfajsz Online

Somogyfajsz (German: Füssen) is a village in Somogy county, Hungary.
