= Kaposvár District =

Coordinates: 46.354935801219455°N 17.793780274356912°E

Kaposvár District Kaposvári járás
- Districts of Hungary
- Coat of arms

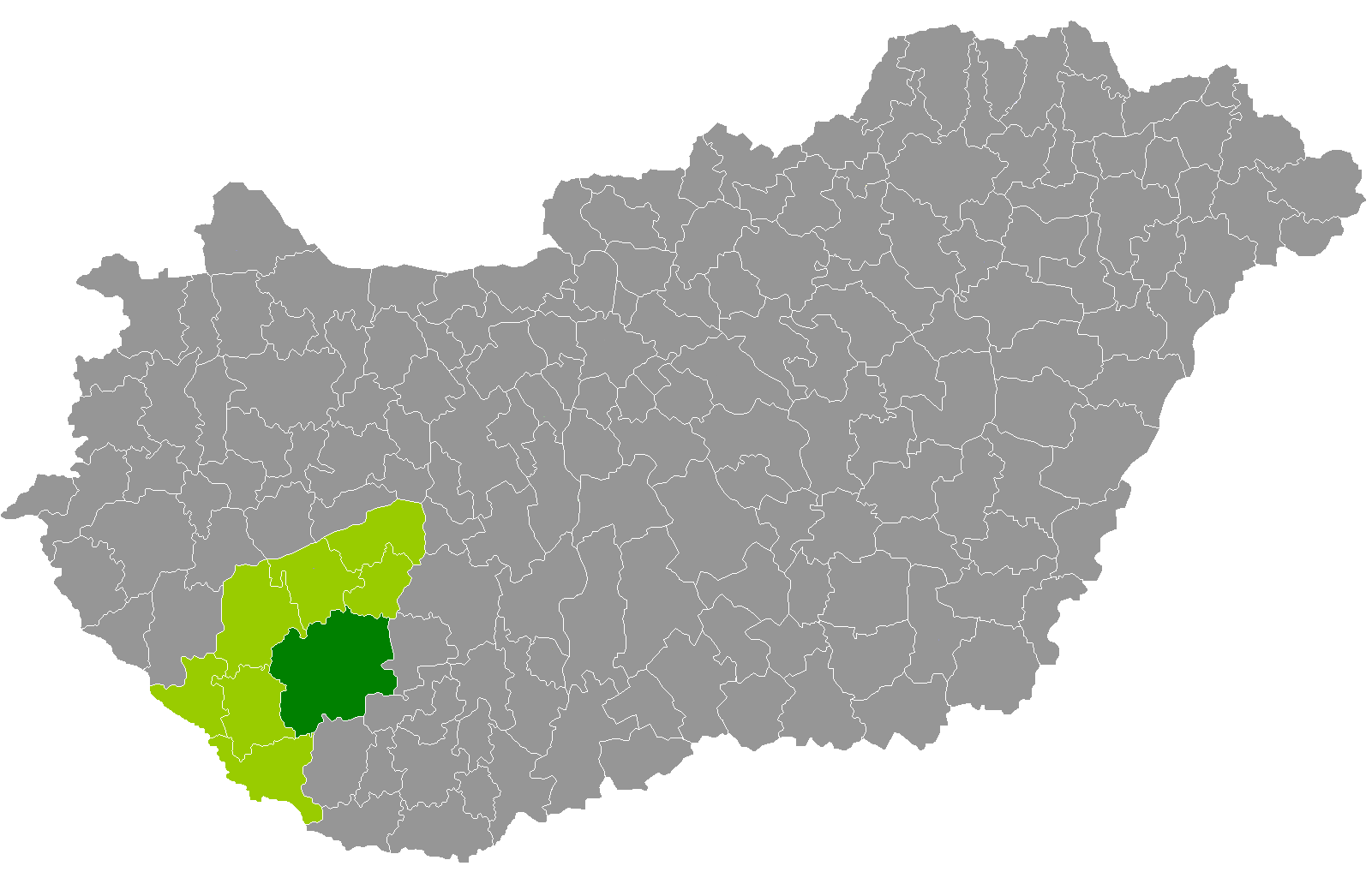
- Kaposvár District within Hungary and Somogy County.
- Country: Hungary
- Region: Southern Transdanubia
- County: Somogy
- District seat: Kaposvár

Area
  - Total: 1,591.36 km^{2} (614.43 sq mi)
  - Rank: 1st in Somogy

Population (2013 census)
  - Total: 117,492
  - Rank: 1st in Somogy
  - Density: 74/km^{2} (190/sq mi)

Kaposvár (Hungarian: Kaposvári járás) is a district in the central-eastern part of Somogy County in Hungary. Kaposvár is also the name of the town where the district and county seat are located. The district is in the Southern Transdanubia Statistical Region.

== Geography ==
Kaposvár District borders with Fonyód District and Tab District to the north, Dombóvár District (Tolna County) and Hegyhát District (Baranya County) to the east, Szigetvár District (Baranya County) and Barcs District to the south, Nagyatád District and Marcali District to the west. The number of the inhabited places in Kaposvár District is 78.

== Municipalities ==
The district has 1 urban county, 3 towns and 74 villages. (ordered by population, as of 1 January 2013)

- Alsóbogát (256)
- Baté (837)
- Bodrog (439)
- Bárdudvarnok (1,127)
- Büssü (400)
- Bőszénfa (530)
- Cserénfa (212)
- Csoma (428)
- Csombárd (270)
- Csököly (1,076)
- Ecseny (239)
- Edde (207)
- Felsőmocsolád (399)
- Fonó (259)
- Gadács (93)
- Gige (377)
- Gálosfa (230)
- Gölle (957)
- Hajmás (223)
- Hedrehely (412)
- Hencse (337)
- Hetes (1,201)
- **Igal** (1,286)
- Juta (1,195)
- Jákó (646)
- **Kadarkút** (2,516)
- Kaposfő (1,613)
- Kaposgyarmat (91)
- Kaposhomok (488)
- Kaposkeresztúr (342)
- Kaposmérő (2,407)
- Kaposszerdahely (980)
- Kaposújlak (748)
- **Kaposvár** (65,337) – district and county seat
- Kazsok (324)
- Kercseliget (391)
- Kisasszond (172)
- Kisgyalán (204)
- Kiskorpád (914)
- Kőkút (582)
- Magyaratád (824)
- Magyaregres (621)
- Mernye (1,410)
- Mezőcsokonya (1,232)
- Mike (635)
- Mosdós (973)
- **Nagybajom** (3,288)
- Nagyberki (1,480)
- Orci (550)
- Osztopán (840)
- Patalom (341)
- Patca (62)
- Pálmajor (359)
- Polány (227)
- Ráksi (443)
- Rinyakovácsi (154)
- Sántos (531)
- Simonfa (358)
- Somodor (411)
- Somogyaszaló (759)
- Somogyfajsz (567)
- Somogygeszti (464)
- Somogyjád (1,601)
- Somogysárd (1,233)
- Somogyszil (759)
- Szabadi (283)
- Szenna (758)
- Szentbalázs (319)
- Szentgáloskér (553)
- Szilvásszentmárton (208)
- Taszár (1,970)
- Újvárfalva (289)
- Várda (449)
- Visnye (258)
- Zimány (574)
- Zselickisfalud (256)
- Zselickislak (304)
- Zselicszentpál (404)

The bolded municipalities are cities.

== See also ==
- List of cities and towns in Hungary
