= NUTS statistical regions of Hungary =

Statistical regions of Hungary

The NUTS codes of Hungary have three levels:

Level	Subdivisions	#
NUTS 1	Statistical large regions (Hungarian: Statisztikai nagyrégiók)	3
NUTS 2	Planning and statistical regions (Tervezési-statisztikai régiók)	8
NUTS 3	Counties (Megyék) + Budapest	20

== Codes ==
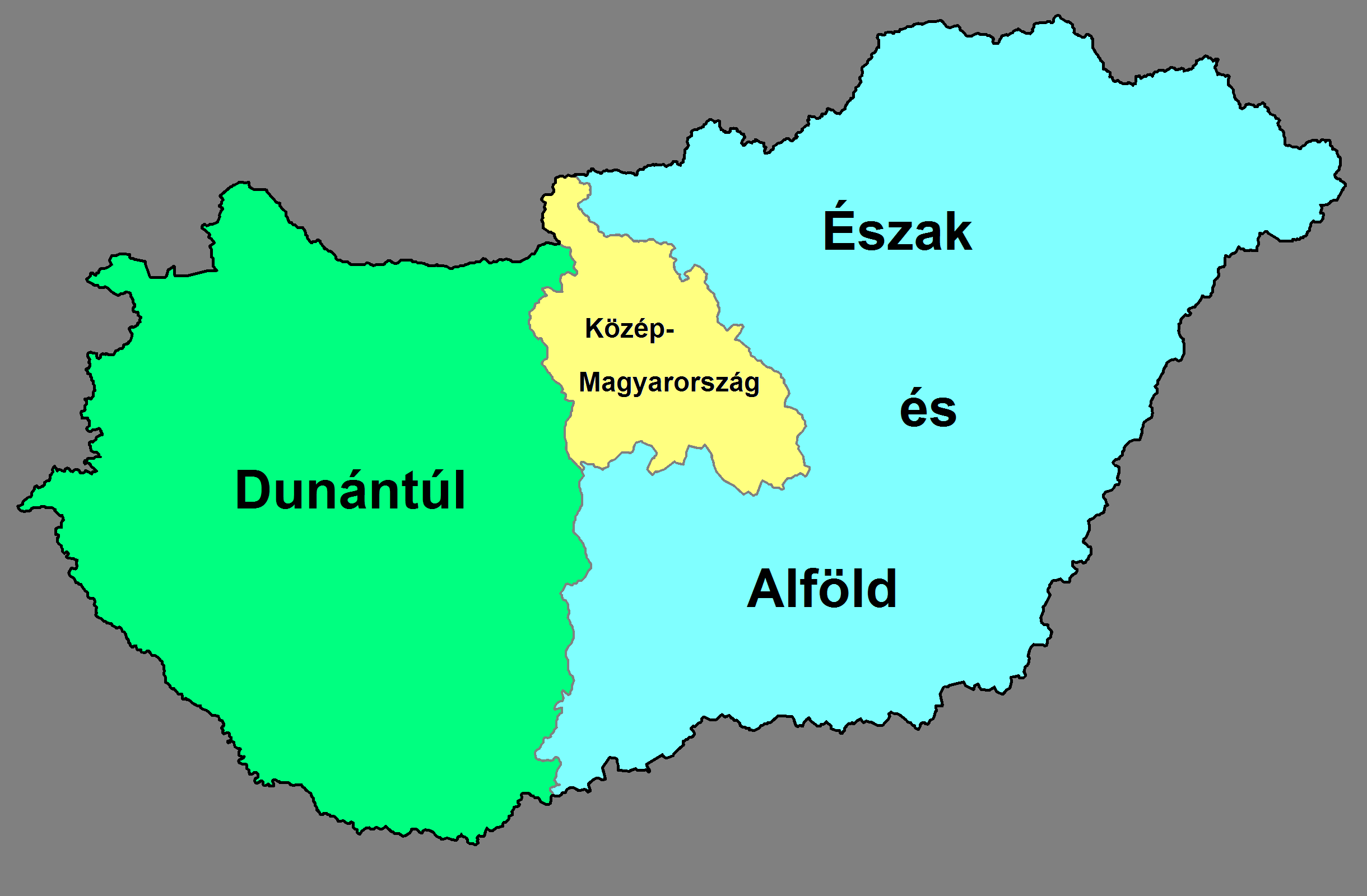
NUTS 1 regions of Hungary

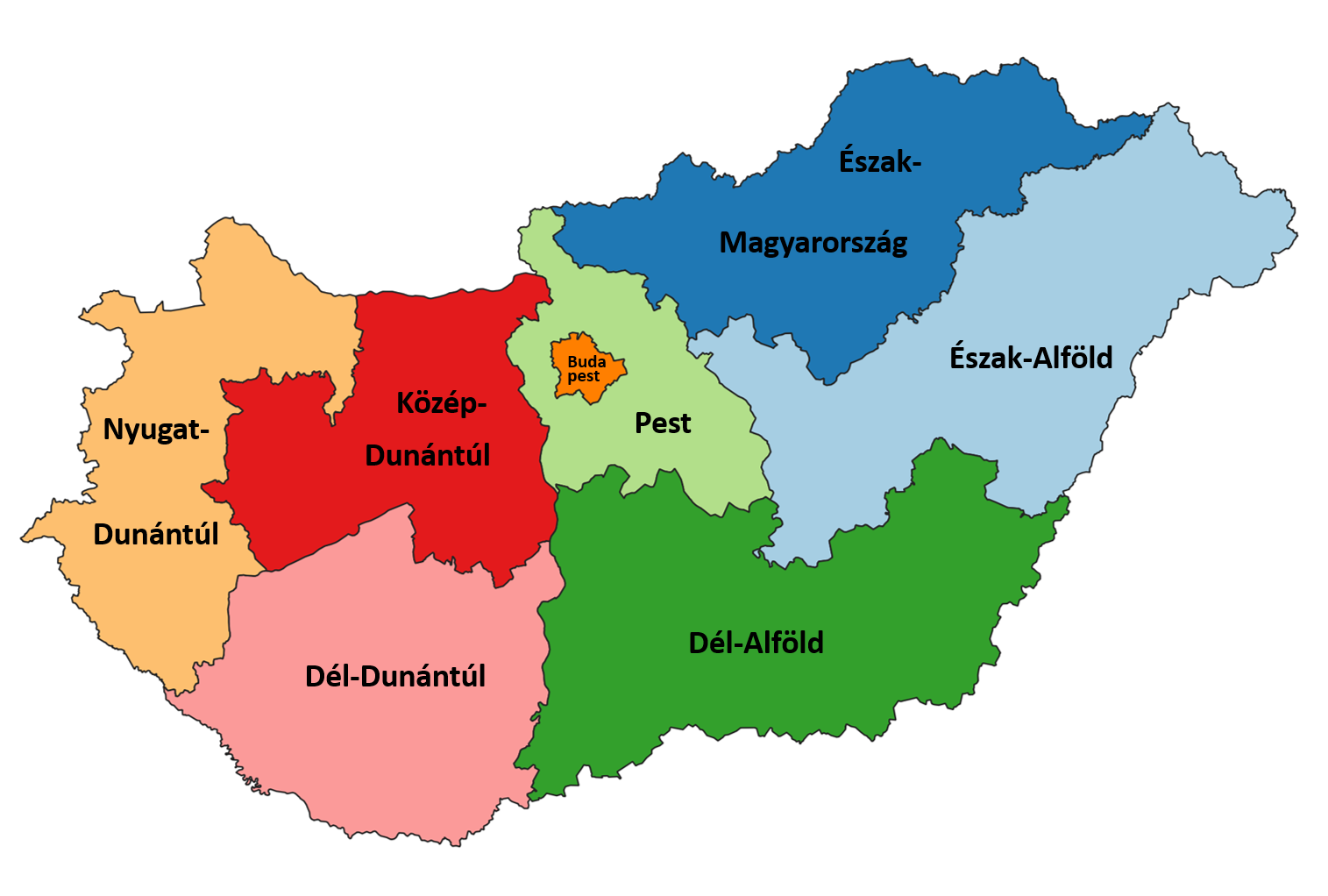
NUTS 2 regions of Hungary

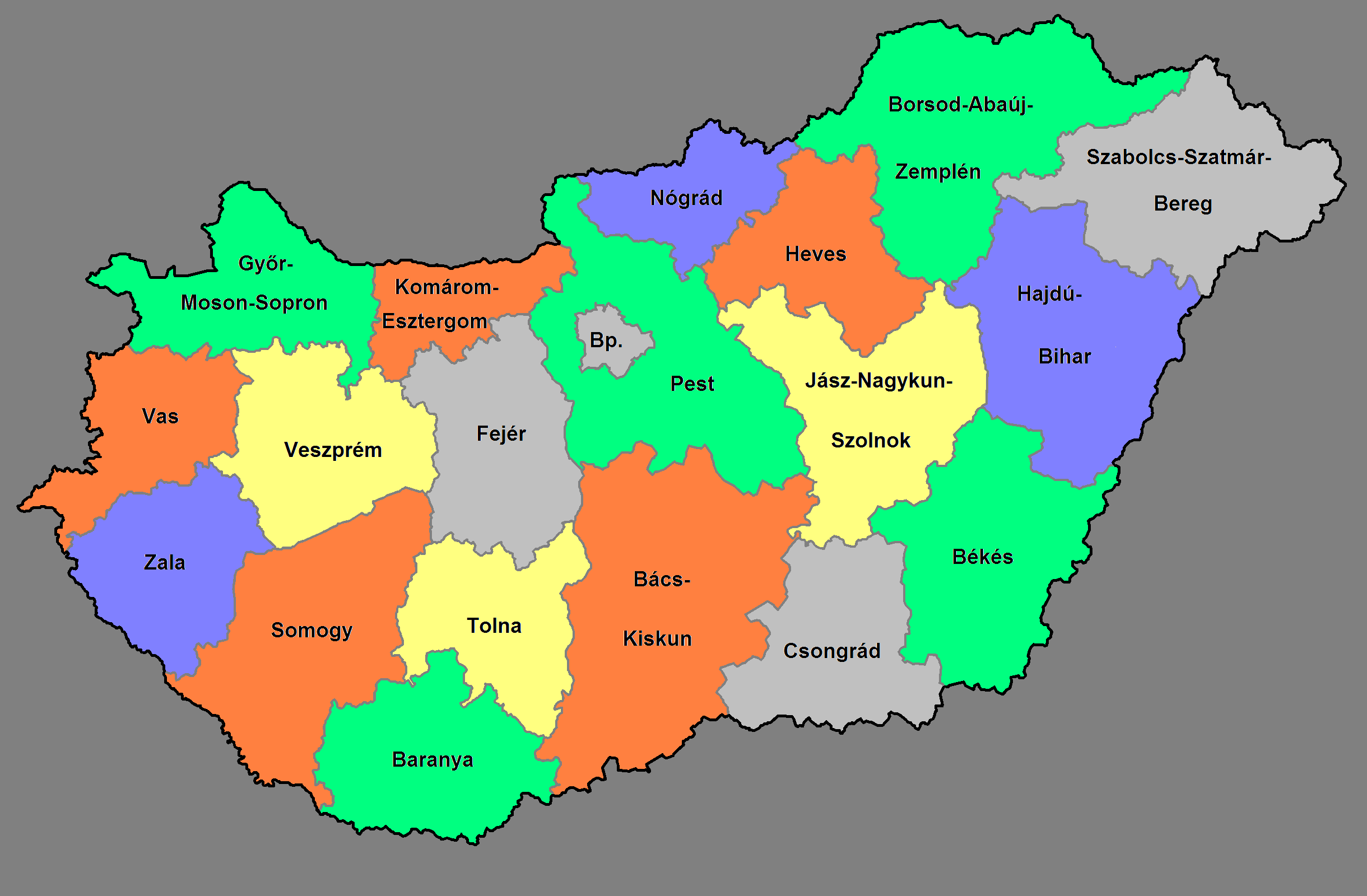
NUTS 3 regions of Hungary

NUTS 1	Code	NUTS 2	Code	NUTS 3	Code
Central Hungary (Közép-Magyarország)	HU1	Budapest	HU11	Budapest	HU110
Central Hungary (Közép-Magyarország)	HU1	Pest	HU12	Pest	HU120
Transdanubia (Dunántúl)	HU2	Central Transdanubia (Közép-Dunántúl)	HU21	Fejér	HU211
Transdanubia (Dunántúl)	HU2	Central Transdanubia (Közép-Dunántúl)	HU21	Komárom-Esztergom	HU212
Transdanubia (Dunántúl)	HU2	Central Transdanubia (Közép-Dunántúl)	HU21	Veszprém	HU213
Transdanubia (Dunántúl)	HU2	Western Transdanubia (Nyugat-Dunántúl)	HU22	Győr-Moson-Sopron	HU221
Transdanubia (Dunántúl)	HU2	Western Transdanubia (Nyugat-Dunántúl)	HU22	Vas	HU222
Transdanubia (Dunántúl)	HU2	Western Transdanubia (Nyugat-Dunántúl)	HU22	Zala	HU223
Transdanubia (Dunántúl)	HU2	Southern Transdanubia (Dél-Dunántúl)	HU23	Baranya	HU231
Transdanubia (Dunántúl)	HU2	Southern Transdanubia (Dél-Dunántúl)	HU23	Somogy	HU232
Transdanubia (Dunántúl)	HU2	Southern Transdanubia (Dél-Dunántúl)	HU23	Tolna	HU233
Great Plain and North (Alföld és Észak)	HU3	Northern Hungary (Észak-Magyarország)	HU31	Borsod-Abaúj-Zemplén	HU311
Great Plain and North (Alföld és Észak)	HU3	Northern Hungary (Észak-Magyarország)	HU31	Heves	HU312
Great Plain and North (Alföld és Észak)	HU3	Northern Hungary (Észak-Magyarország)	HU31	Nógrád	HU313
Great Plain and North (Alföld és Észak)	HU3	Northern Great Plain (Észak-Alföld)	HU32	Hajdú-Bihar	HU321
Great Plain and North (Alföld és Észak)	HU3	Northern Great Plain (Észak-Alföld)	HU32	Jász-Nagykun-Szolnok	HU322
Great Plain and North (Alföld és Észak)	HU3	Northern Great Plain (Észak-Alföld)	HU32	Szabolcs-Szatmár-Bereg	HU323
Great Plain and North (Alföld és Észak)	HU3	Southern Great Plain (Dél-Alföld)	HU33	Bács-Kiskun	HU331
Great Plain and North (Alföld és Észak)	HU3	Southern Great Plain (Dél-Alföld)	HU33	Békés	HU332
Great Plain and North (Alföld és Észak)	HU3	Southern Great Plain (Dél-Alföld)	HU33	Csongrád-Csanád	HU333

== Local administrative units ==
Below the NUTS levels, the two LAU (Local Administrative Units) levels are:

Level	Subdivisions	#
LAU 1	Statistical sub-regions (Statisztikai kistérségek)	174
LAU 2	Settlements (Települések)	3152

The LAU codes of Hungary can be downloaded here:

== Changes in NUTS 2016 classification ==
The NUTS classification is regularly updated to reflect changes and modifications proposed by Member States. As part of this process the European Commission has adopted changes concerning Hungary in December 2016. The new classification that has been introduced have split the region Central Hungary in two: Budapest (previously HU101) and Pest county (previously HU102). The new classification is in use since 1 January 2018.

== See also ==
- ISO 3166-2 codes of Hungary
- FIPS region codes of Hungary
- Regions of Hungary
- Counties of Hungary
- Districts of Hungary (from 2013)
  - Subregions of Hungary (until 2013)
- Administrative divisions of the Kingdom of Hungary (until 1918)
  - Counties of the Kingdom of Hungary
- Administrative divisions of the Kingdom of Hungary (1941–44)
- List of cities and towns of Hungary

== Sources ==
- Hierarchical list of the Nomenclature of territorial units for statistics - NUTS and the Statistical regions of Europe
- Overview map of EU Countries - NUTS level 1
  - MAGYARORSZÁG - NUTS level 2
  - MAGYARORSZÁG - NUTS level 3
- Correspondence between the NUTS levels and the national administrative units
- List of current NUTS codes
  - Download current NUTS codes (ODS format)
- Counties of Hungary, Statoids.com
