= List of Catholic dioceses in Hungary =

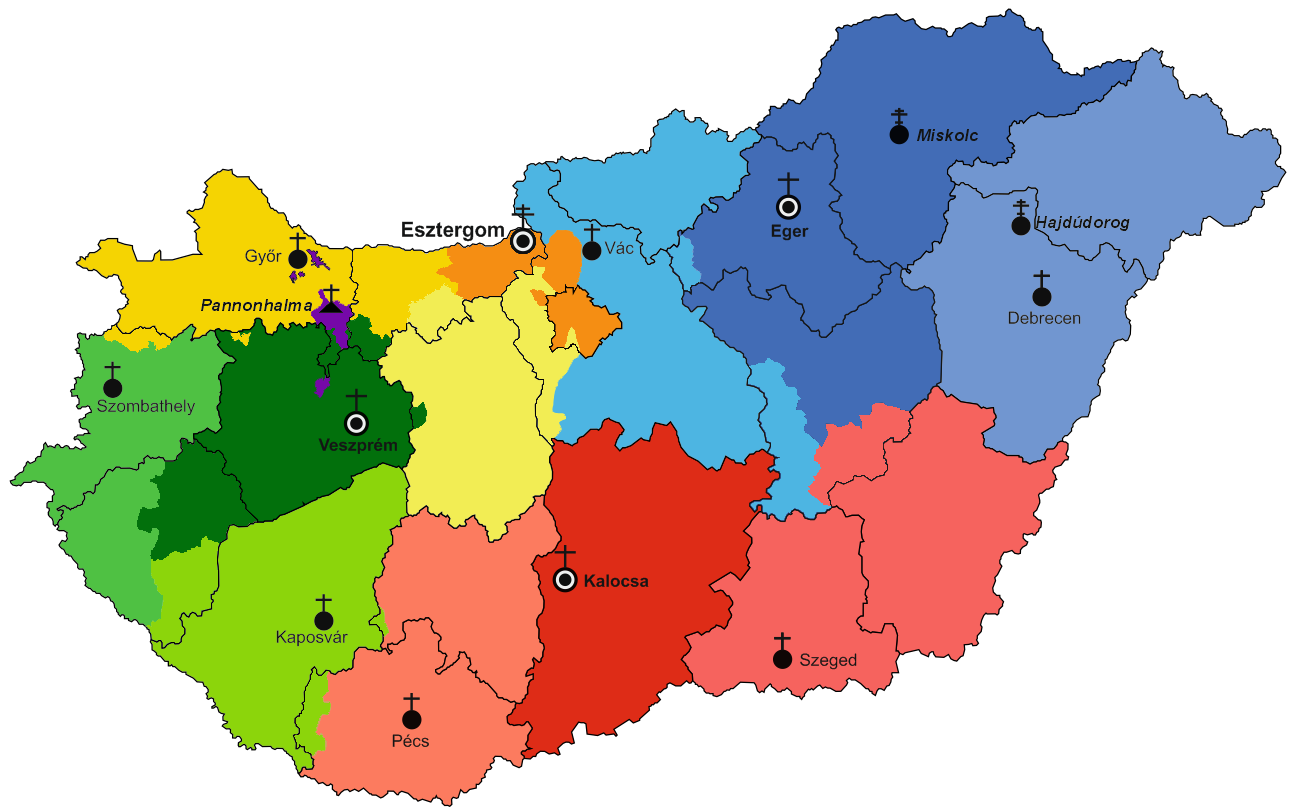
Map of the Roman Catholic dioceses in Hungary

The Roman Catholic Church in Hungary is composed of:

- A Latin hierarchy, comprising
  - four ecclesiastical provinces, comprising their Metropolitan archdioceses and in total nine suffragan dioceses
  - the exempt Military Ordinariate
  - the exempt Territorial Archabbey of Pannonhalma.
- The overlapping proper province of the Hungarian Greek Catholic Church (Eastern Catholic sui iuris, Byzantine Rite in Hungarian)

There is also an Apostolic nunciature, the papal diplomatic representation in Hungary.

== Current Latin Dioceses (Roman Rite) ==
=== Exempt Sui iuris Jurisdictions ===
directly subject to the Holy See

- Military Ordinariate of Hungary (Tábori Püspökség)
- Territorial Abbey of Pannonhalma

=== Ecclesiastical Province of Esztergom–Budapest ===
- Metropolitan Archdiocese of Esztergom–Budapest, primatial see of Hungary
  - Diocese of Győr
  - Diocese of Székesfehérvár

=== Ecclesiastical Province of Eger ===
- Metropolitan Archdiocese of Eger
  - Diocese of Debrecen–Nyíregyháza
  - Diocese of Vác

=== Ecclesiastical Province of Kalocsa–Kecskemét ===
- Metropolitan Archdiocese of Kalocsa–Kecskemét
  - Diocese of Pécs
  - Diocese of Szeged–Csanád

=== Ecclesiastical Province of Veszprém ===
- Metropolitan Archdiocese of Veszprém
  - Diocese of Kaposvár
  - Diocese of Szombathely

== Current Eastern Catholic dioceses ==
=== Hungarian (Greek) Catholic province ===
- Metropolitan Hungarian Catholic Archeparchy of Hajdúdorog (Metropolitan see sui iuris, in chief of the entire Hungarian language Byzantine Rite church)
  - Hungarian Catholic Eparchy of Miskolc
  - Hungarian Catholic Eparchy of Nyíregyháza

== Defunct jurisdictions ==
There is no titular see.

All former jurisdictions have a current successor.

== Sources and external links ==
- GCatholic.org.
- Catholic-Hierarchy entry.
