= Diocese of Kaposvár =

Latin Catholic jurisdiction in Hungary

Diocese of Kaposvár Dioecesis Kaposvarensis Kaposvári egyházmegye

Catholic
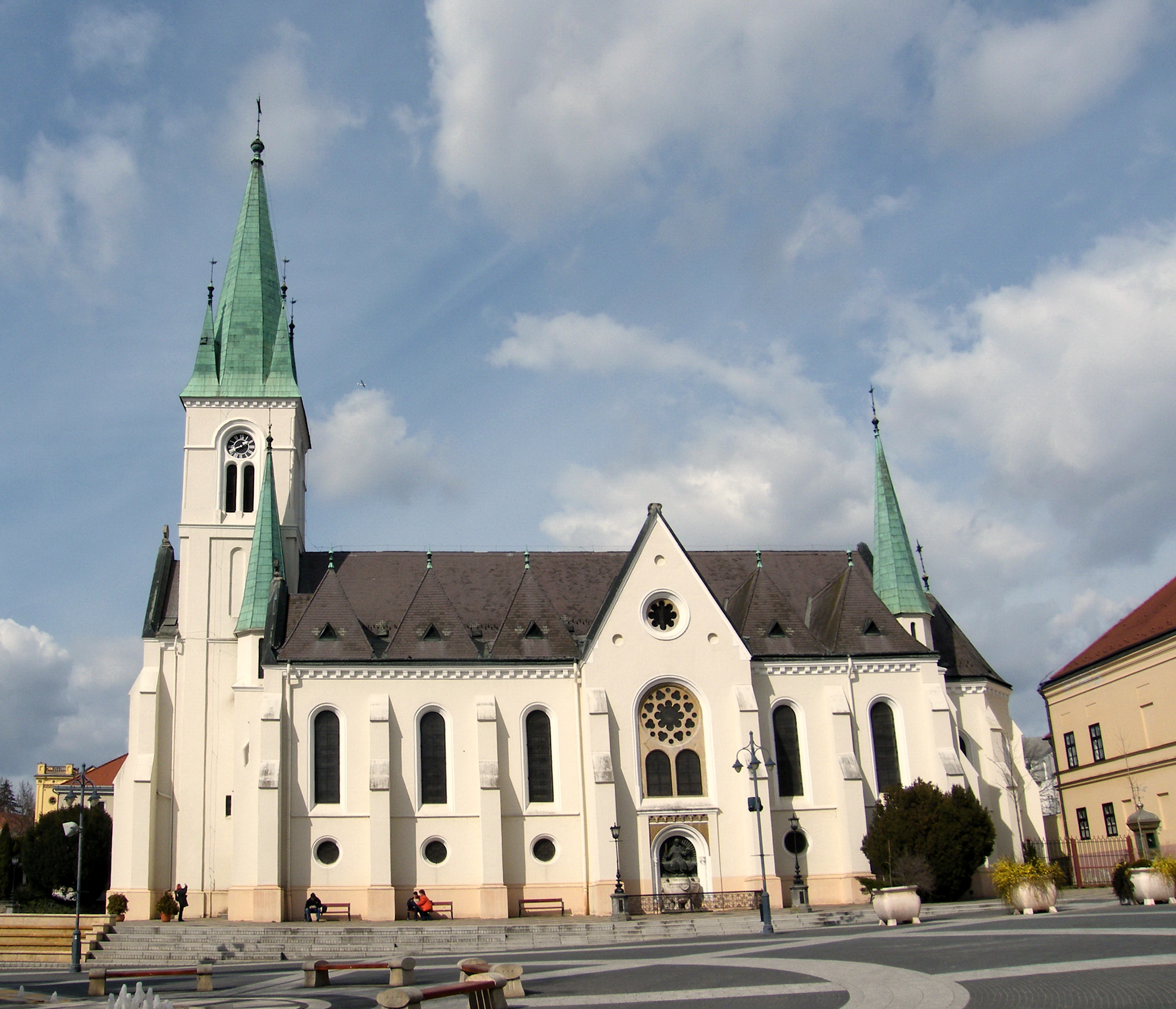
- Our Lady of the Assumption Cathedral

Location
- Country: Hungary
- Ecclesiastical province: Veszprém
- Headquarters: Kaposvár
- Coordinates: 46°21′28″N 17°47′17″E

Statistics
- Area: 6,790 km^{2} (2,620 sq mi)
- Population: Total; Catholics: (as of 2019); 397,800; 292,000 (73.0%)

Information
- Denomination: Catholic Church
- Sui iuris church: Latin Church
- Rite: Roman Rite
- Established: May 31, 1993
- Cathedral: Our Lady of the Assumption Cathedral, Kaposvár

Current leadership
- Pope: Leo XIV
- Bishop: László Varga
- Metropolitan Archbishop: Udvardy György

Map
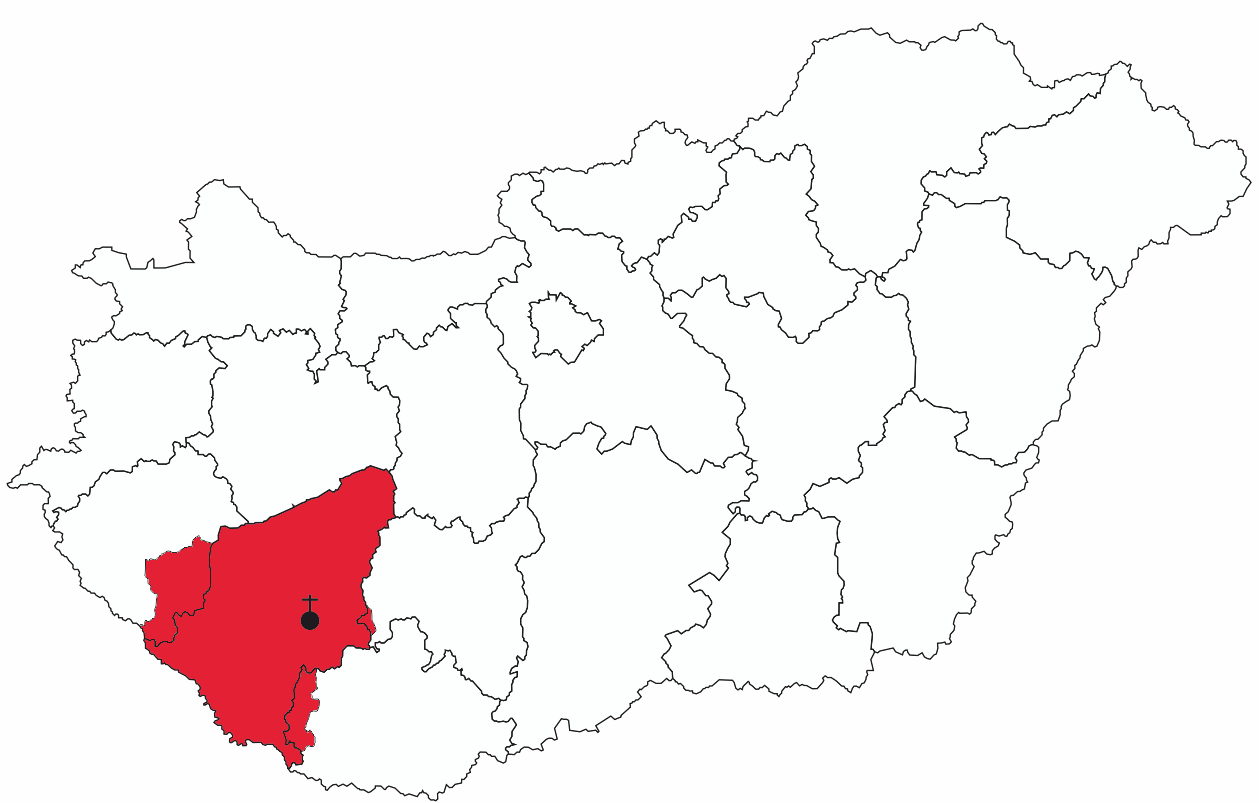
- Map of the Diocese

Website
- kaposvar.egyhazmegye.hu

The Diocese of Kaposvár (Latin: Dioecesis Kaposvarensis) is a Latin suffragan diocese in the ecclesiastical province of the Metropolitan Archdiocese of Veszprém, in southwestern Hungary.

Its cathedral episcopal, Our Lady of the Assumption Cathedral, is dedicated to the Blessed Virgin Mary (Hungarian: Nagyboldogasszony-székesegyház), in the city of Kaposvár, capital of Somogy County.

== History ==
- Established on May 31, 1993 as Diocese of Kaposvár, on territory split off from its future Metropolitan, the then Diocese of Veszprém.

== Statistics ==
As of 2014, it pastorally served 290,425 Catholics (73.5% of 395,207 total) on 6,764 km² in 102 parishes with 95 priests (diocesan), 4 deacons, 6 lay religious (sisters) and 8 seminarians.

== Episcopal ordinaries ==
Suffragan Bishops of Kaposvár

- Béla Balás (31 May 1993 – 25 March 2017), previously Titular Bishop of Feradi maius (1992.08.10 – 1993.05.31) as Auxiliary Bishop of Veszprém (Hungary) (1992.08.10 – 1993.05.31)
- László Varga (13 May 2017 – ...)

== See also ==
- List of Catholic dioceses in Hungary
- Catholic Church in Hungary

== Sources ==
- GCatholic.org - data for all sections
- Catholic Hierarchy
