= Somogy County 1st constituency =

- Constituency for the National Assembly
- Location of Somogy county 01 within Somogy county

- Location of Somogy county within Hungary
- County: Somogy County
- Population: 72,866 (2022)
- Major settlements: Kaposvár

Current constituency
- Created: 2011
- Party: Tisza Party
- Member: Viktória Lőrincz
- Elected: 2026

The Somogy County 1st parliamentary constituency is one of the 106 constituencies into which the territory of Hungary is divided by Act CCIII of 2011, and in which voters can elect one member of the National Assembly. The standard abbreviation of the constituency name is: Somogy 01. OEVK. The seat is Kaposvár.

== Area ==
The constituency includes the following settlements:

1. Bőszénfa
2. Cserénfa
3. Csoma
4. Gálosfa
5. Hajmás
6. Juta
7. Kaposgyarmat
8. Kaposhomok
9. Kaposkeresztúr
10. Kaposmérő
11. Kaposújlak
12. Kaposszerdahely
13. Kaposvár
14. Kercseliget
15. Mosdós
16. Nagyberki
17. Patca
18. Sántos
19. Simonfa
20. Szabadi
21. Szenna
22. Szentbalázs
23. Szilvásszentmárton
24. Zselickisfalud
25. Zselickislak
26. Zselicszentpál

== Members of parliament ==
Name	Party	Term	Elections
Attila Gelencsér	Fidesz-KDNP	2014–2026	Results of the 2014 parliamentary election:
Attila Gelencsér	Fidesz-KDNP	2014–2026	Results of the 2018 parliamentary election:
Attila Gelencsér	Fidesz-KDNP	2014–2026	Results of the 2022 parliamentary election:
Viktória Lőrincz	Tisza Party	2026 – present	Results of the 2026 parliamentary election: 57.45%

== Demographics ==
Historical population
Year	Pop.	±%
2011	80,508	—
2022	72,866	−9.5%

The demographics of the constituency are as follows. The population of constituency No. 1 of Somogy County was 72,866 on 1 October 2022. The population of the constituency decreased by 13,353 between the 2011 and 2022 censuses. Based on the age composition, the majority of the population in the constituency is middle-aged with 26,579 people, while the least is children with 11,784 people. 83.3% of the population of the constituency has internet access.

According to the highest level of completed education, those with a high school diploma are the most numerous, with 21,973 people, followed by graduates with 14,562 people.

According to economic activity, nearly half of the population is employed, 34,172 people, the second most significant group is inactive earners, who are mainly pensioners, with 19,500 people.

The most significant ethnic group in the constituency is the Roma with 1,281 people and the Germans with 675 people. The proportion of foreign citizens without Hungarian citizenship is 0.7%.

According to religious composition, the largest religion of the residents of the constituency is Roman Catholic (23,051 people), and a significant community is the Calvinist (3,249 people). The number of those not belonging to a religious community is also significant (8,329 people), the second largest group in the constituency after the Roman Catholic religion.

== Sources ==
- ↑ Vjt.: "2011. évi CCIII. törvény az országgyűlési képviselők választásáról". Nemzeti Jogszabálytár. Magyar Közlöny Lap- és Könyvkiadó Kft.
- ↑ KSH: "Az országgyűlési egyéni választókerületek adatai". Népszámlálás 2011. Központi Statisztikai Hivatal.
- ↑ NVI: "Egyéni jelöltek".
