= Csoma =

Csoma is the name of

- Csoma, Hungary, village in Somogy county, Hungary.
- Sándor Kőrösi Csoma, Hungarian explorer
- Csoma család, noble family with the title Primor from Gelence (Ghelința), Transylvania
