= Szabadi =

- Village
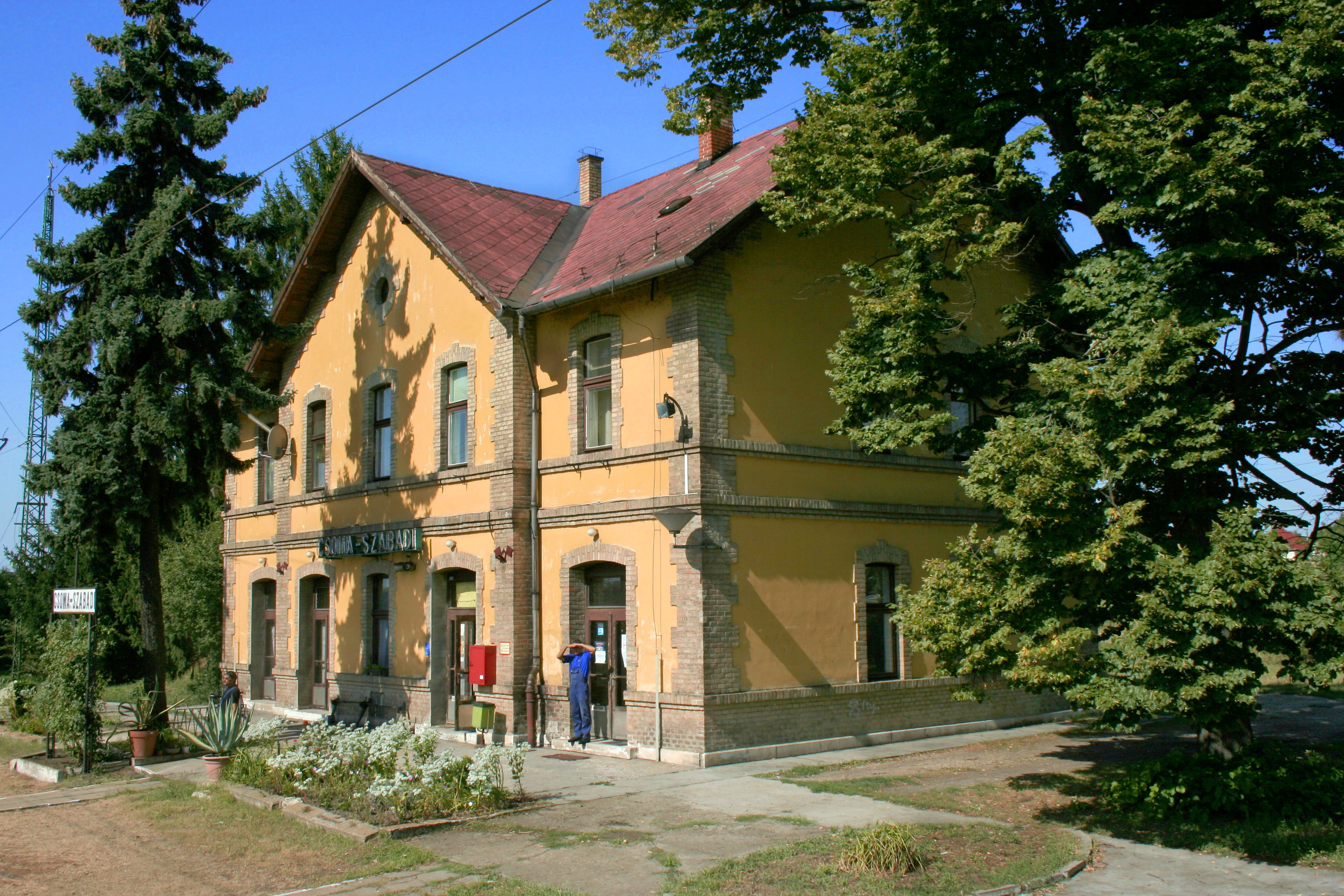
- Trainstation of Csoma-Szabadi

- Location of Somogy county in Hungary

- Location of Szabadi
- Coordinates: 46.36703°N 18.03436°E
- Country: Hungary
- Region: Southern Transdanubia
- County: Somogy
- District: Kaposvár
- RC Diocese: Kaposvár

Area
  - Total: 8.23 km^{2} (3.18 sq mi)

Population (2017)
  - Total: 285
  - Density: 34.6/km^{2} (89.7/sq mi)
- Demonym: szabadi
- Time zone: UTC+1 (CET)
  - Summer (DST): UTC+2 (CEST)
- Postal code: 7253
- Area code: (+36) 82
- NUTS 3 code: HU232
- MP: Attila Gelencsér (Fidesz)
- Website: Szabadi Online

Szabadi is a village in Somogy county, Hungary.

The settlement is part of the Balatonboglár wine region.

== Geography ==
It lies in the valley of the River Kapos, 20 km east of Kaposvár on the road 61, next to the Dombóvár-Gyékényes Railway Line. It has a common railway station with the neighboring Csoma. The nearest town, Dombóvár is 9 km away.

== History ==
Szabadi was first mentioned in the papal tithe register between 1332 and 1337. After the Turkish occupation its residents were mostly gentries (kuriális falu English: curial village) in 1969. In the same year the village came from Tolna County to Somogy County. The Batthyány family became its owner in 1715. Later it belonged to the Schmiedegg and Batthyány families. Its first Roman Catholic school opened in 1770. The Lutherans also established their own school in 1839 which operated until 1937. The seal of Szabadi is since 1788 in usage. According to the 1849 census Szabadi and Kisgát had together 136 Hungarian and 200 German residents.

Its population was always around 500 and Hungarian in majority with a significant German minority. The residents started to migrate to Kaposvár or to the nearby towns (Dombóvár, Igal, Sásd etc.). The Lutherans built their church in the 19th century which perished with time, therefore they built a new one in 1998.

== Main sights ==
- stone crosses (1866, 1880, 1902)
- four old houses (built at the beginning of the 20th century)
