= Szenna =

- Village
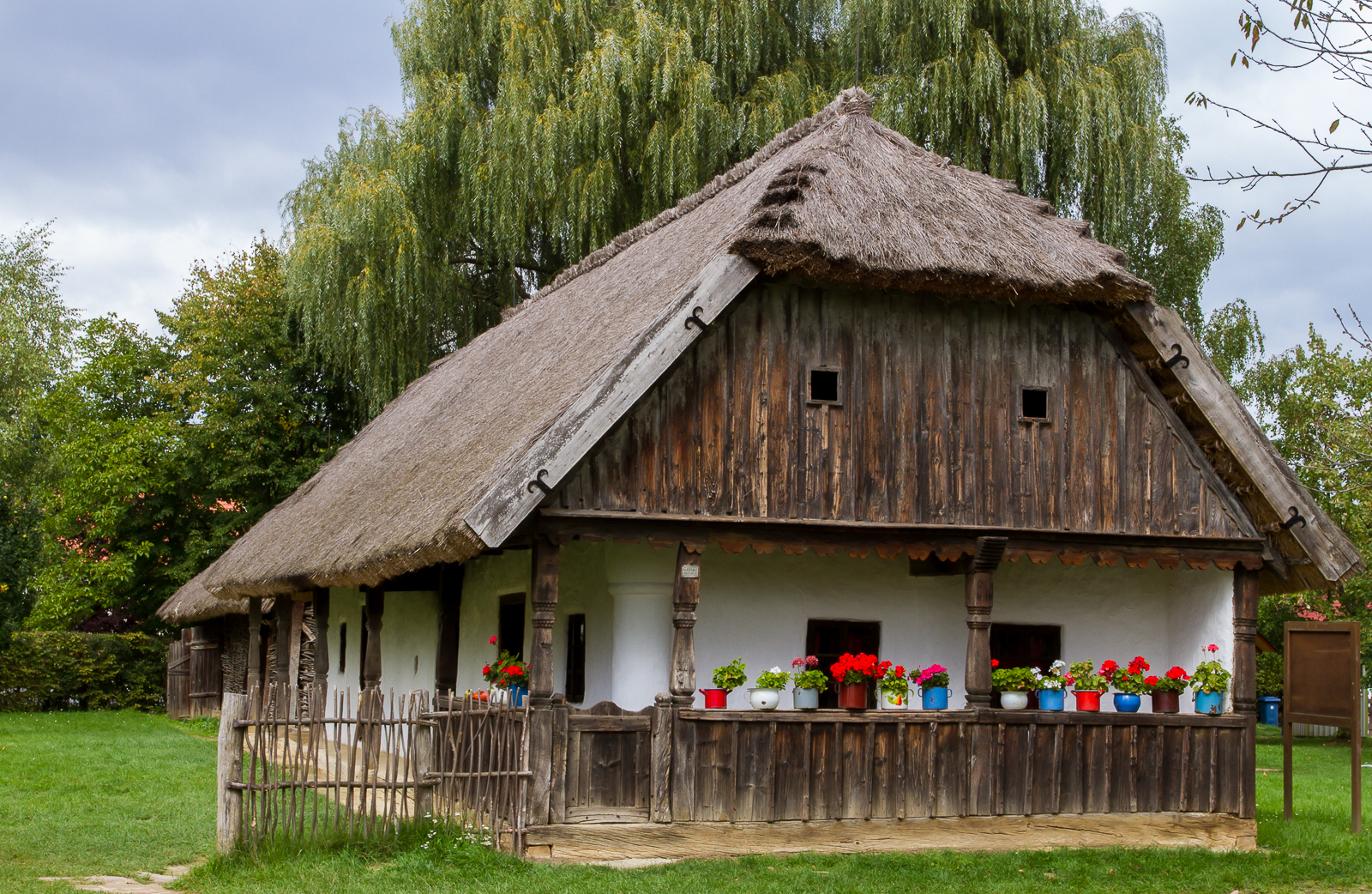
- Traditional house in Szenna

- Coat of arms

- Location of Somogy county in Hungary

- Location of Szenna
- Coordinates: 46.30710°N 17.73147°E
- Country: Hungary
- Region: Southern Transdanubia
- County: Somogy
- District: Kaposvár
- RC Diocese: Kaposvár

Area
  - Total: 26.98 km^{2} (10.42 sq mi)

Population (2017)
  - Total: 760
  - Density: 28/km^{2} (73/sq mi)
- Demonym: szennai
- Time zone: UTC+1 (CET)
  - Summer (DST): UTC+2 (CEST)
- Postal code: 7477
- Area code: (+36) 82
- NUTS 3 code: HU232
- MP: Attila Gelencsér (Fidesz)
- Website: Szenna Online

Szenna is a village in Somogy county, Hungary. It is famous for the Szenna Open Air Museum (Szenna Skanzen), which won the Europa Nostra award in 1982.

== Etymology ==
The name of the village derives from the South Slavic word сено (Hungarian: széna, English: hay).

== Geography ==
Szenna lies in the Zselic National Landscape Protection Area, 8 km (5.0 mi) southwest of Kaposvár, in the middle of the Zselic Hill Range.

== History ==
Szenna was first mentioned in the 16th century as Zana and Zenna in official documents as the possession of the Castle of Kaposvár. During the Turkish occupation most of its residents died or flew. According to the 1687 records it had only 1-6 houses. According to László Szita the settlement was completely Hungarian in the 18th century.

The village came into the hands of the Esterházy family in 1715. During the Reformation the population converted first to Lutheranism than to Calvinism. Their first church was built in the 17th century. In 1736 several Hungarian families settled there from Hetes and Kaposszerdahely. At the beginning of the 20th century the settlement was among the richest in Somogy County. They bred cattle, sold woods and transport goods. The village was nationally reputed for its colts.

== Main sights ==
- Skanzen of Szenna - opened in 1978, it was awarded the Europa Nostra Prize in 1982
- Reformed church - built in the 18th century with cassette ceiling decorated with folklore motives
- A local tradition in Szenna, taking place around Easter and dating back to around the 2nd century AD (and during a pre-Christian time in Hungarian tribes), is called the "watering of the girls", a fertility ritual where boys throw buckets of water at young girls running past them.

== Culture ==
The Hungarian folk songs A szennai lipisen and Két út van előttem were collected in 1934 in Szenna by László Lajtha.

== Notable residents ==
- Augustinus Roskoványi (1807 – 1892), Hungarian Roman Catholic Bishop of Nyitra, philosopher, theologian

== Gallery ==
=== Reformed Church of Szenna ===
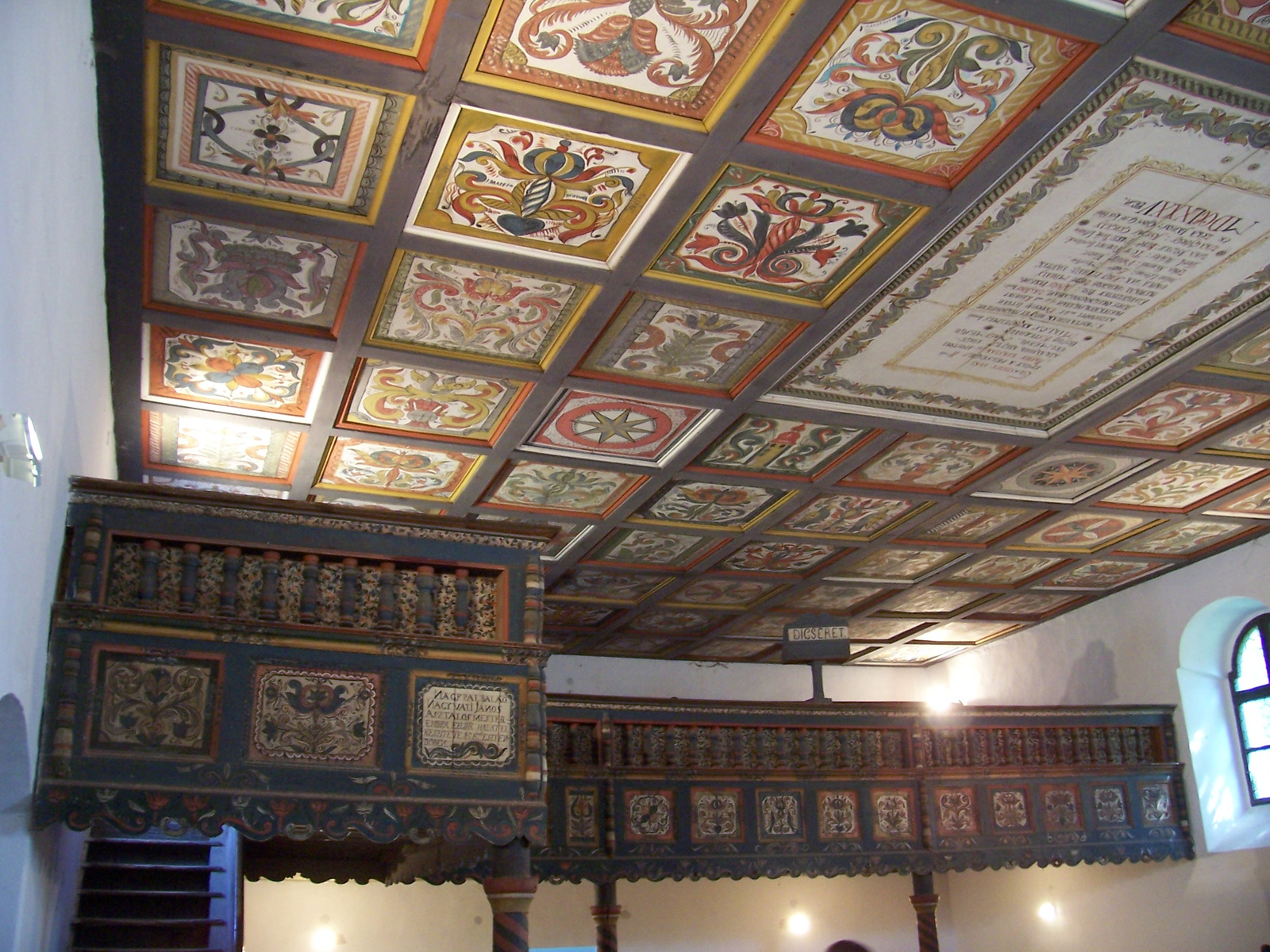
Wooden cassette ceiling of the reformed church in Szenna

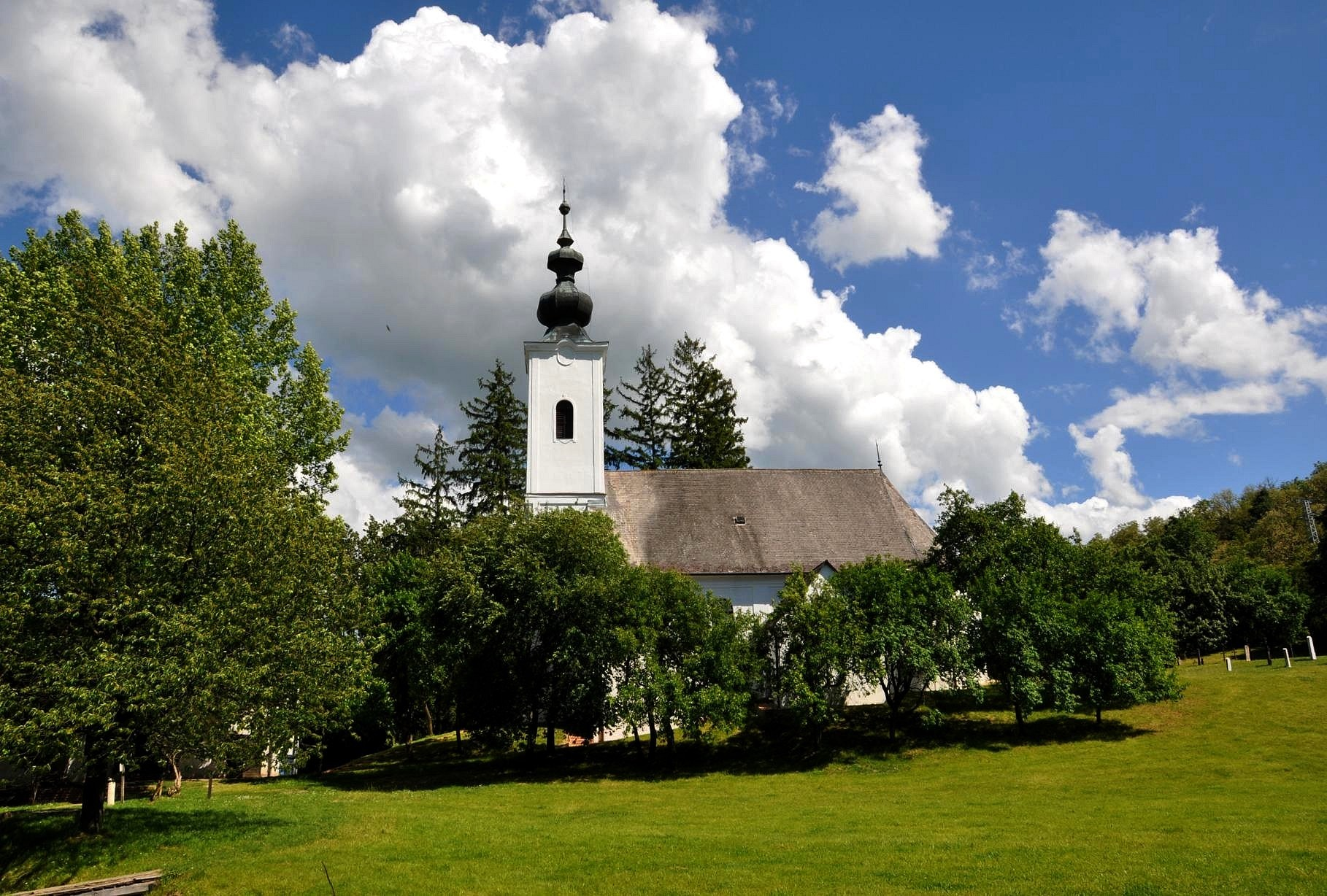
Reformed church of Szenna

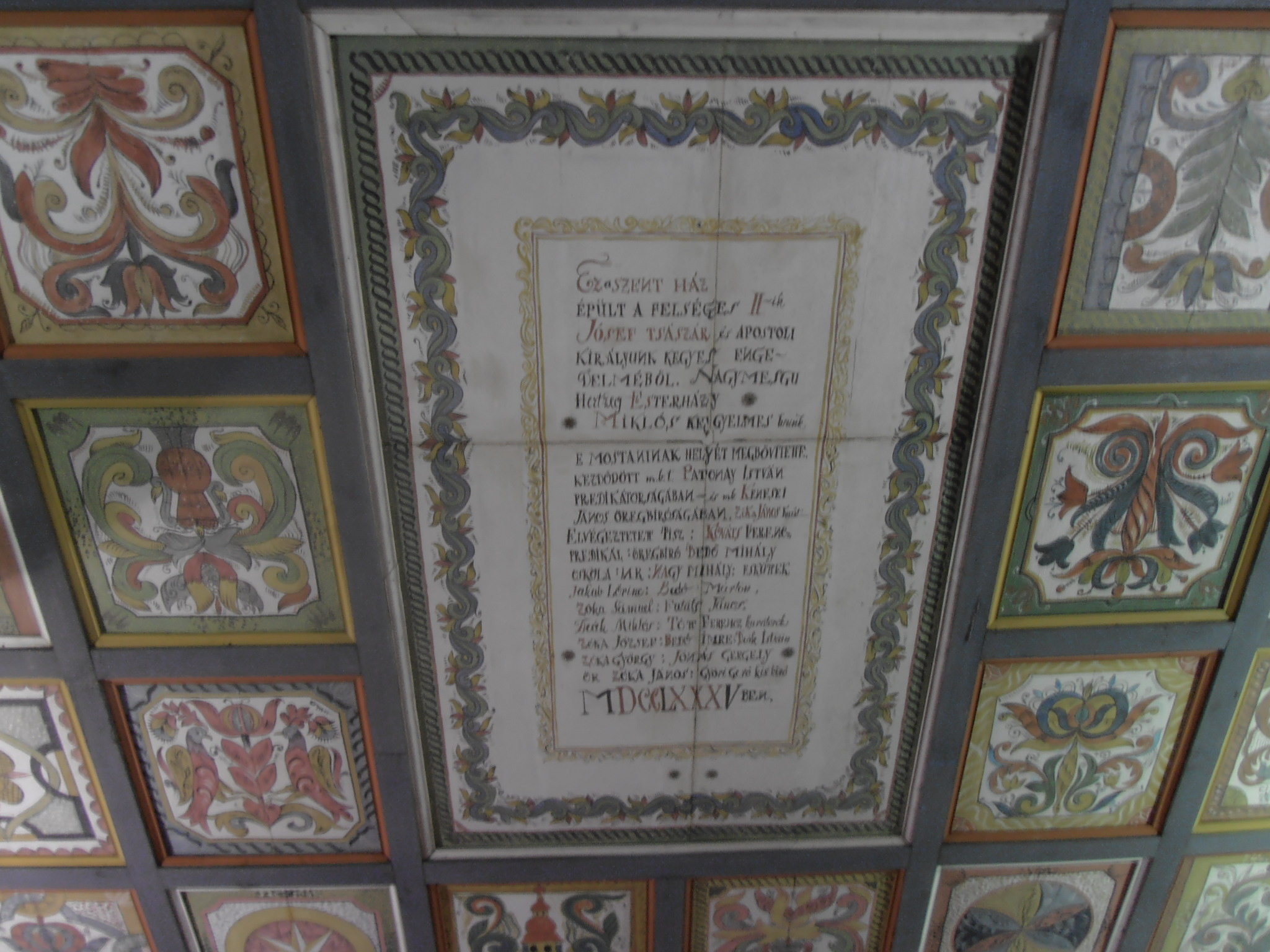
Wooden cassette ceiling of the reformed church in Szenna

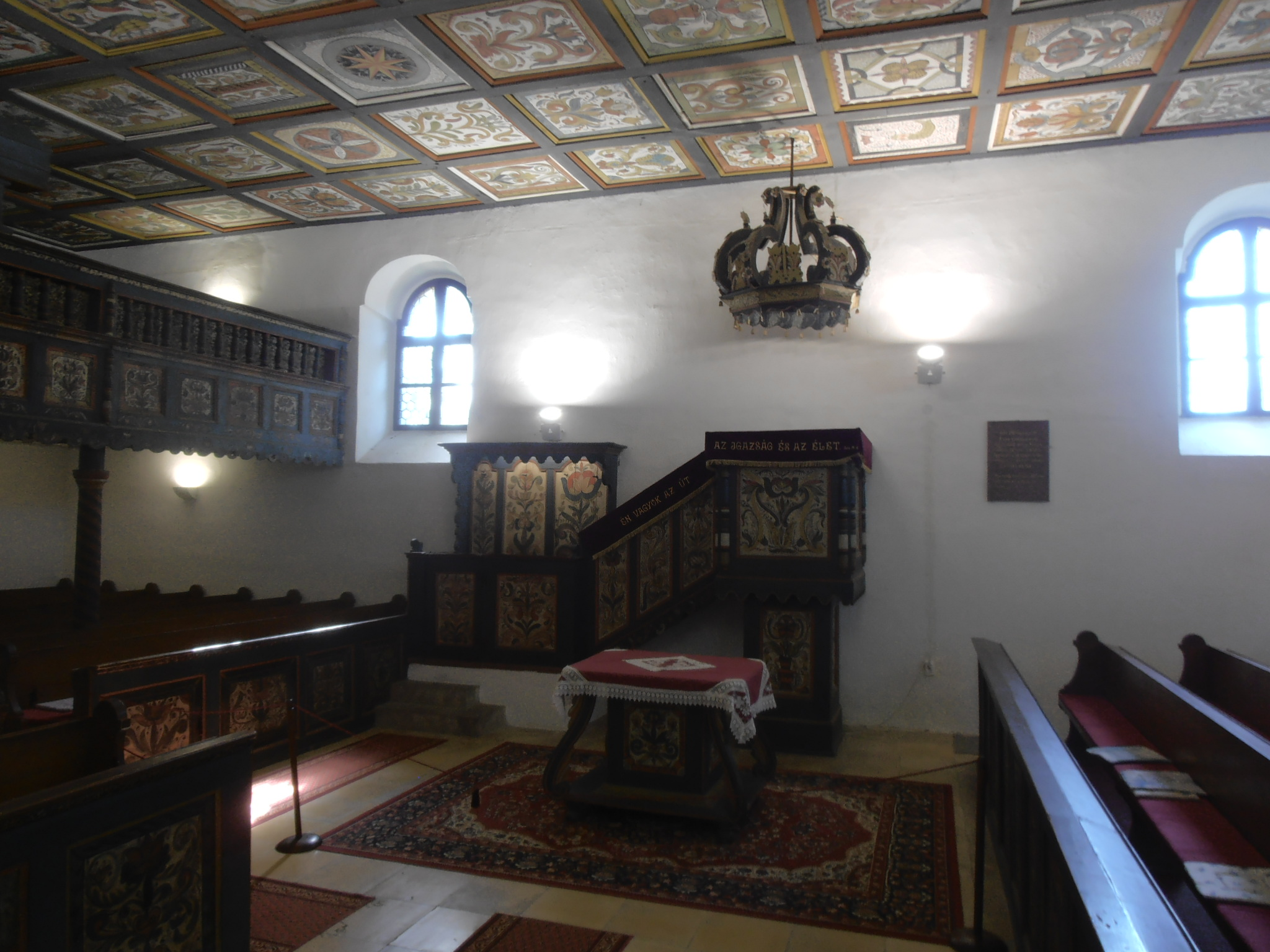
Interior of the reformed church in Szenna

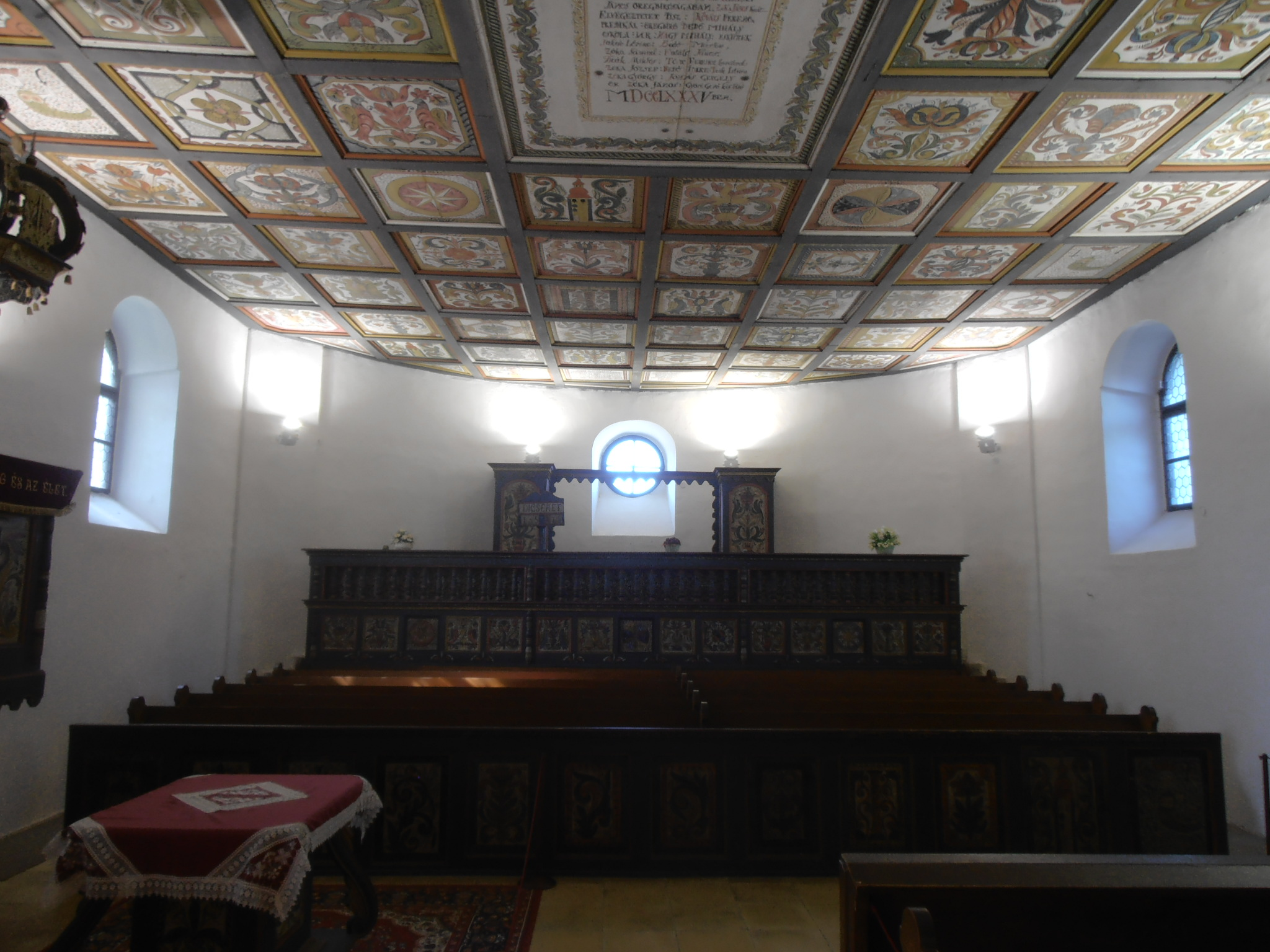
Interior of the reformed church in Szenna

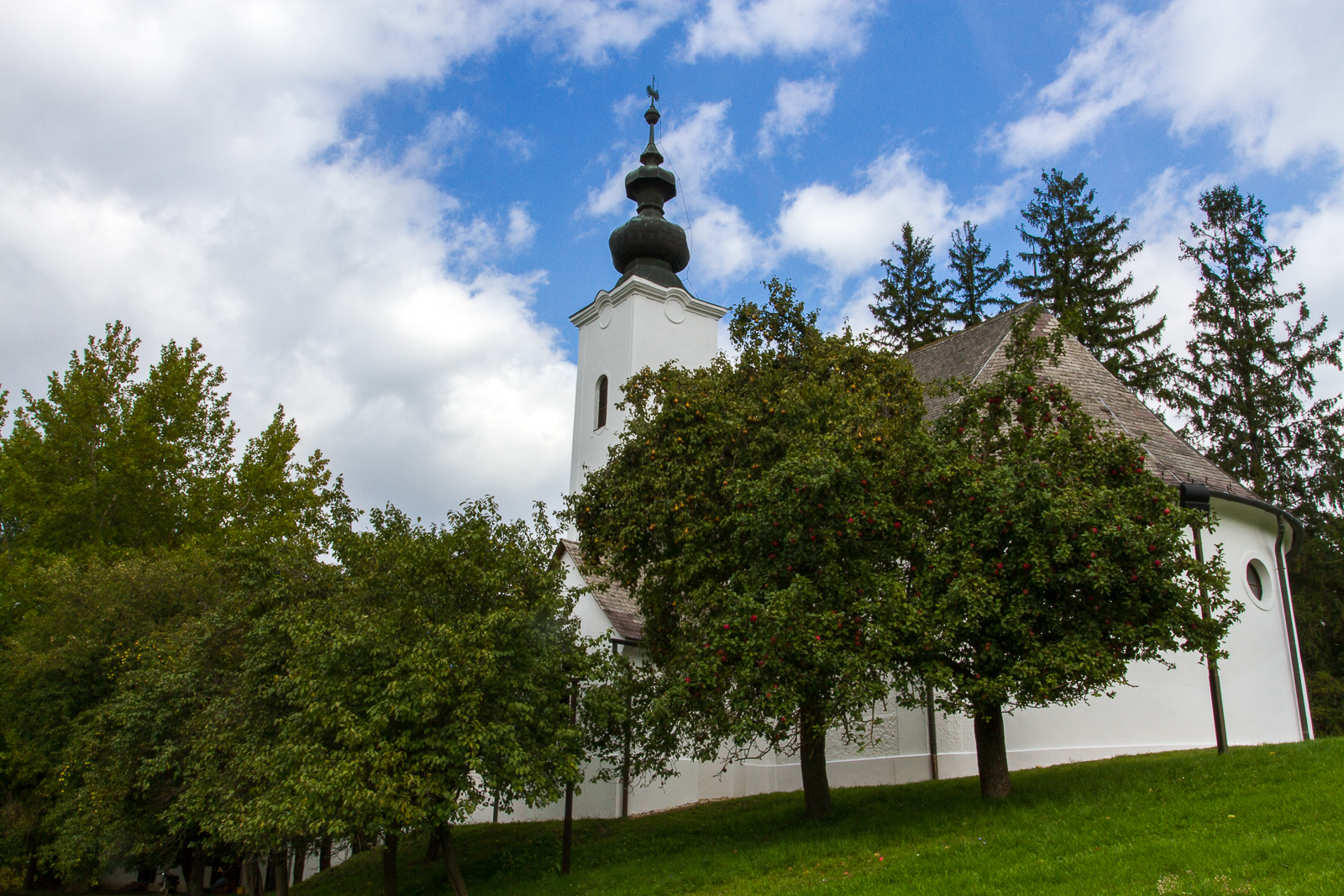
Reformed church in Szenna

=== Open air museum of Szenna ===
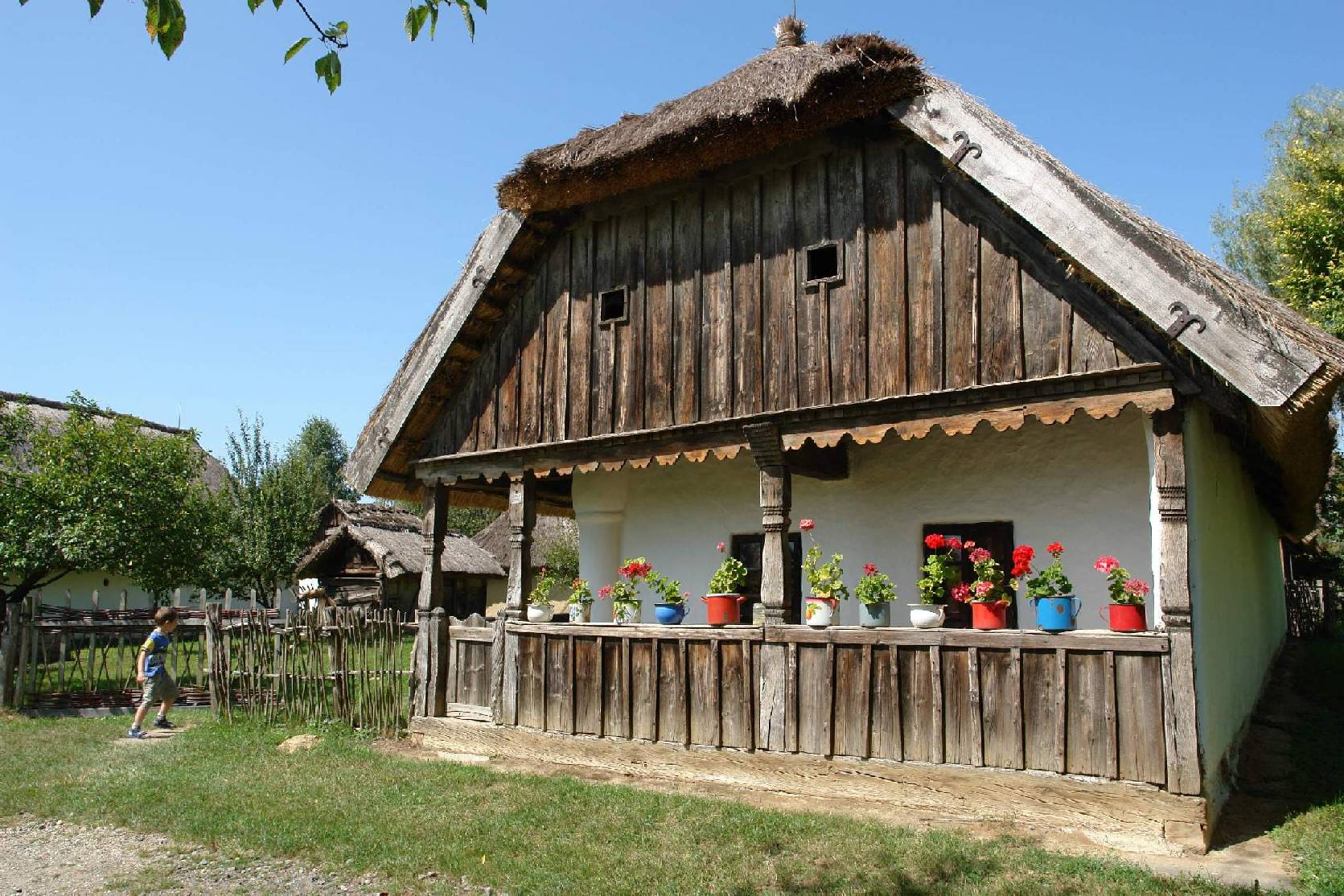
Traditional house in Szenna

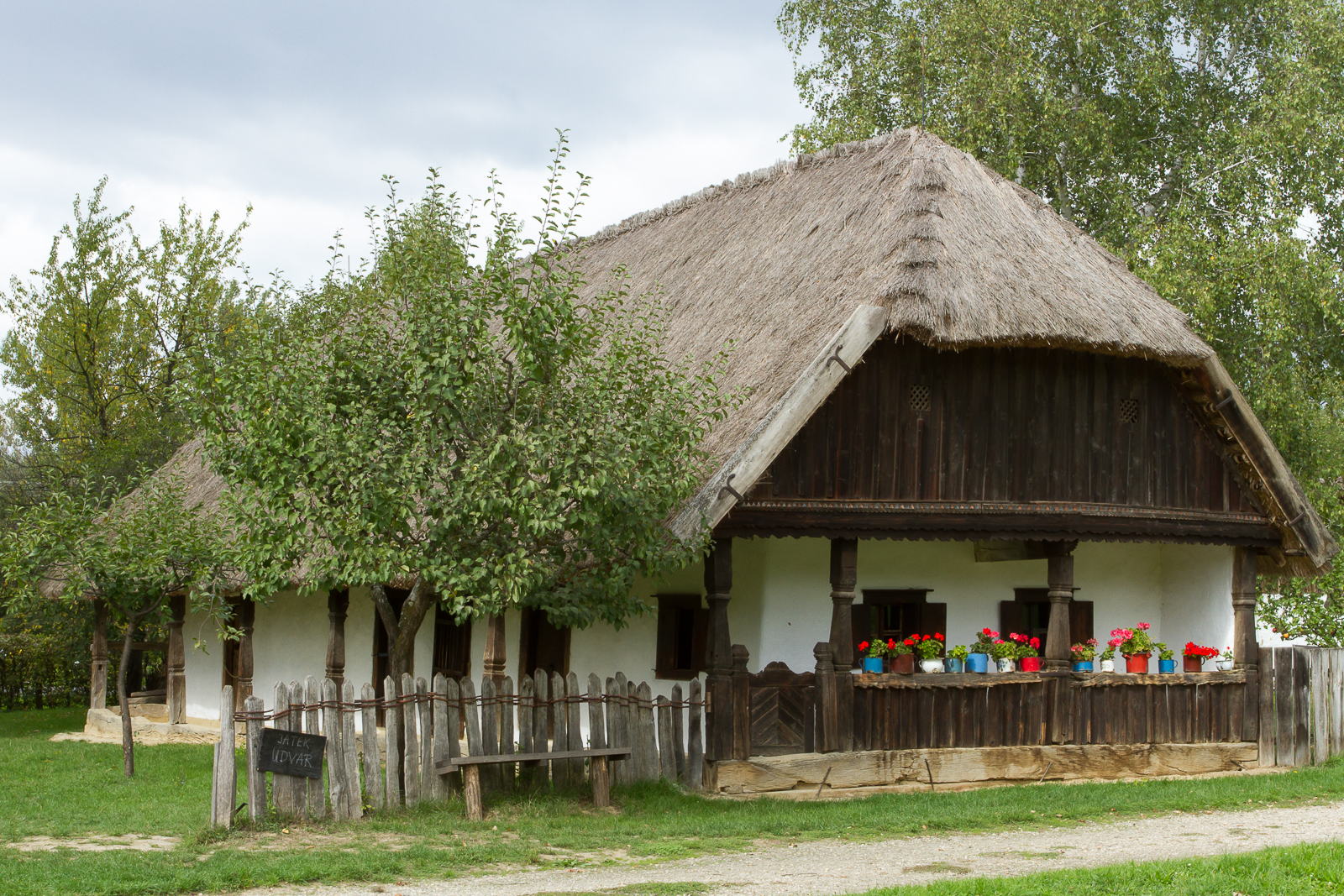
Traditional house in Szenna

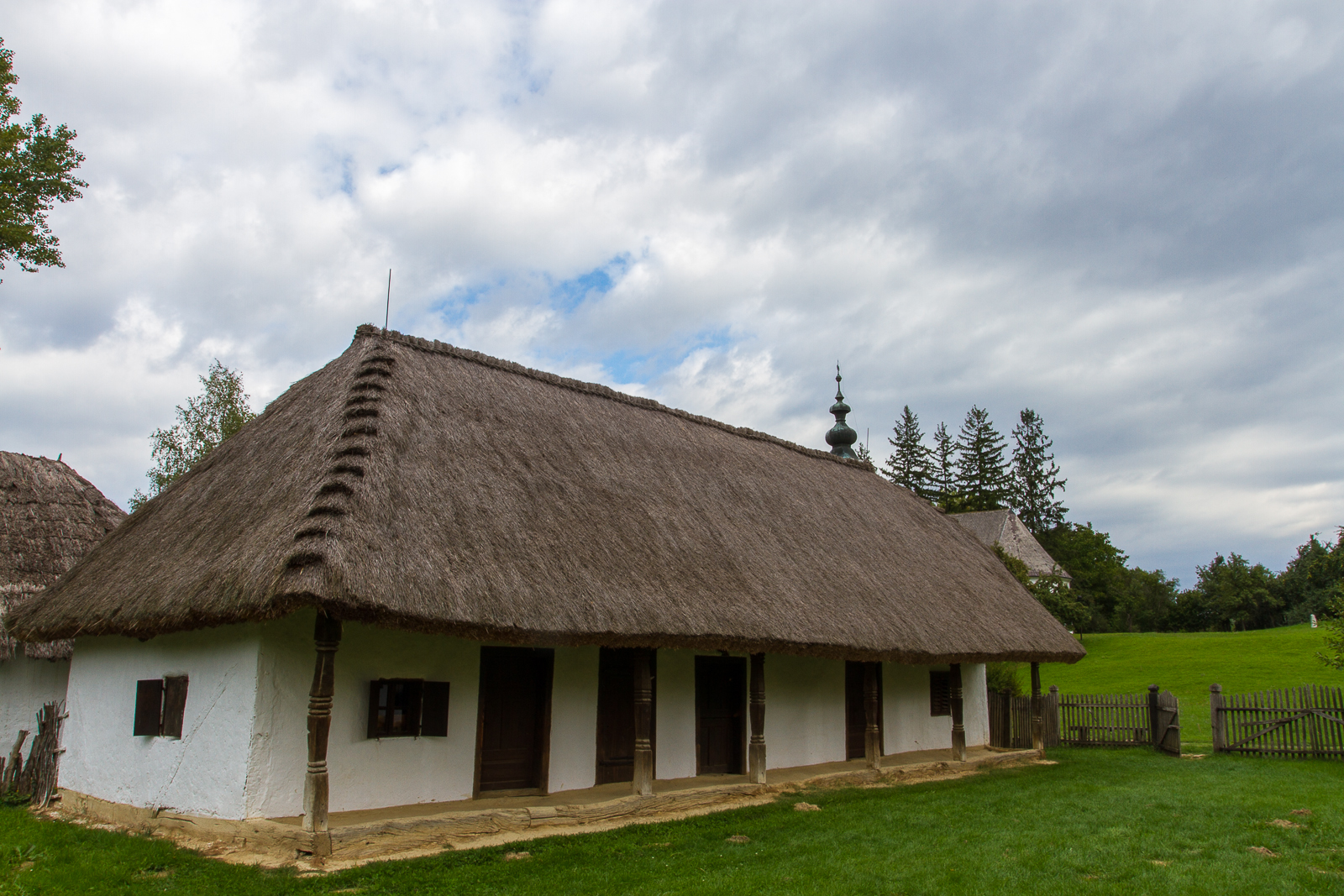
Traditional house in Szenna

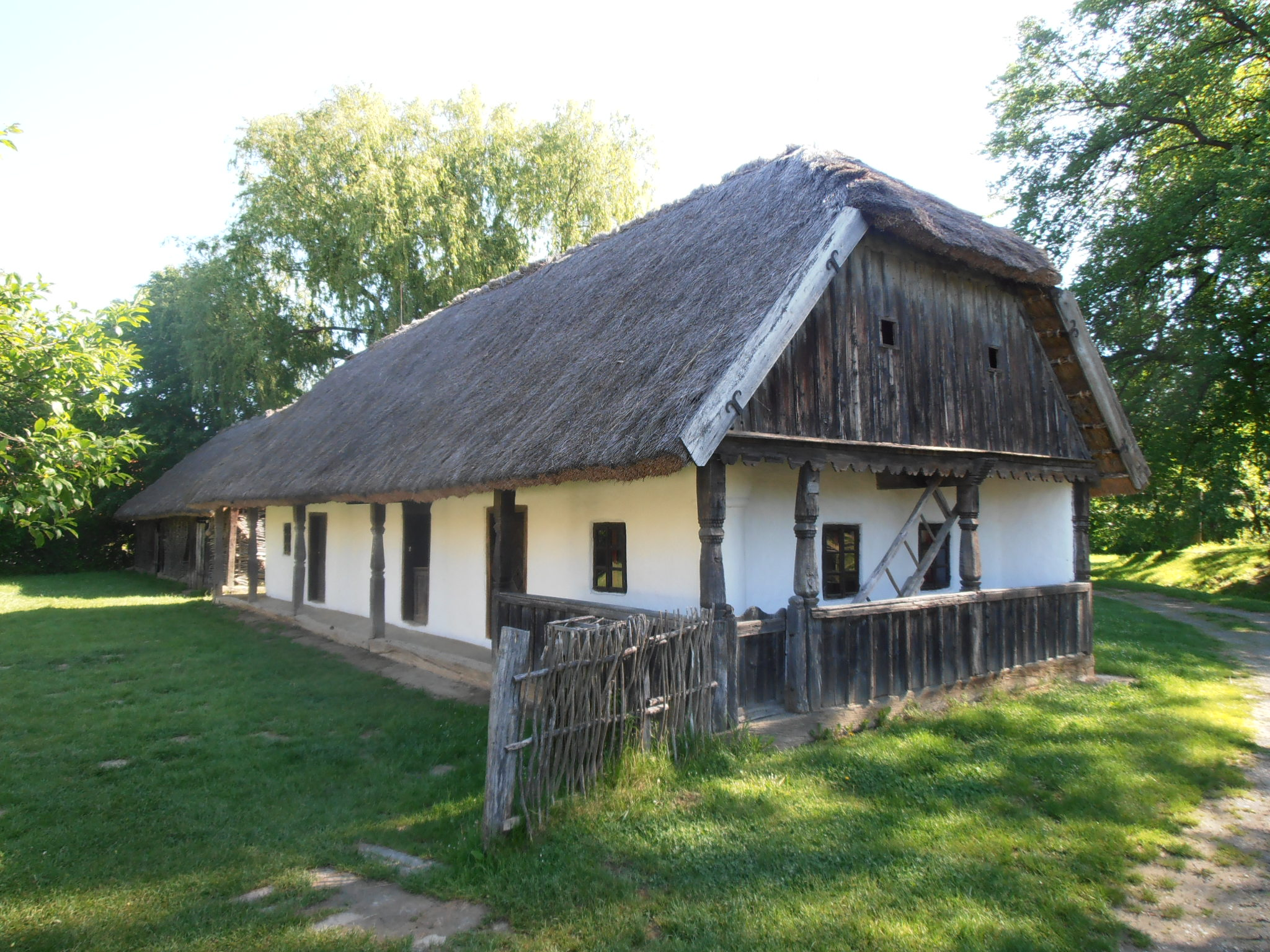
Traditional house in Szenna

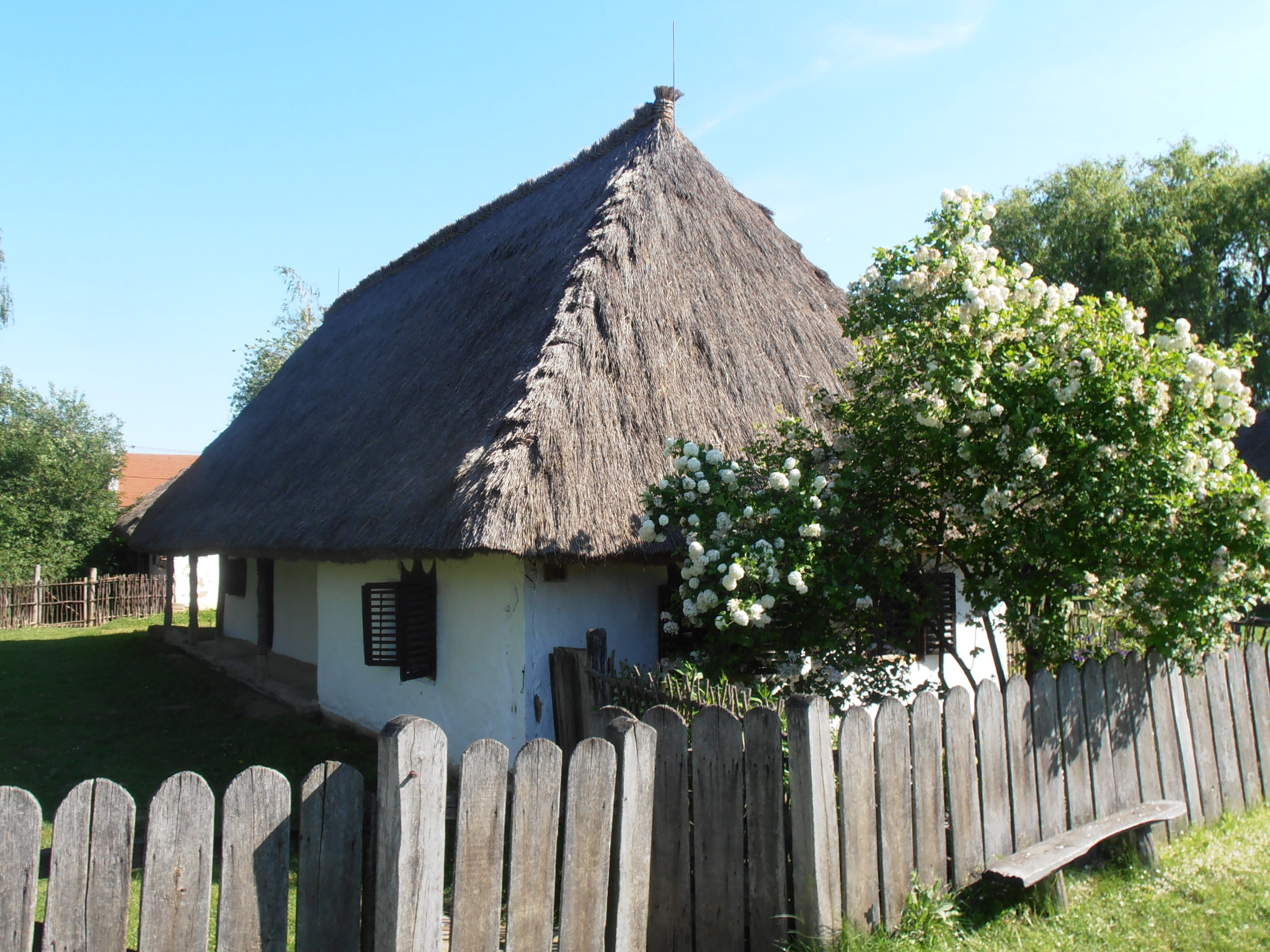
Traditional house in Szenna

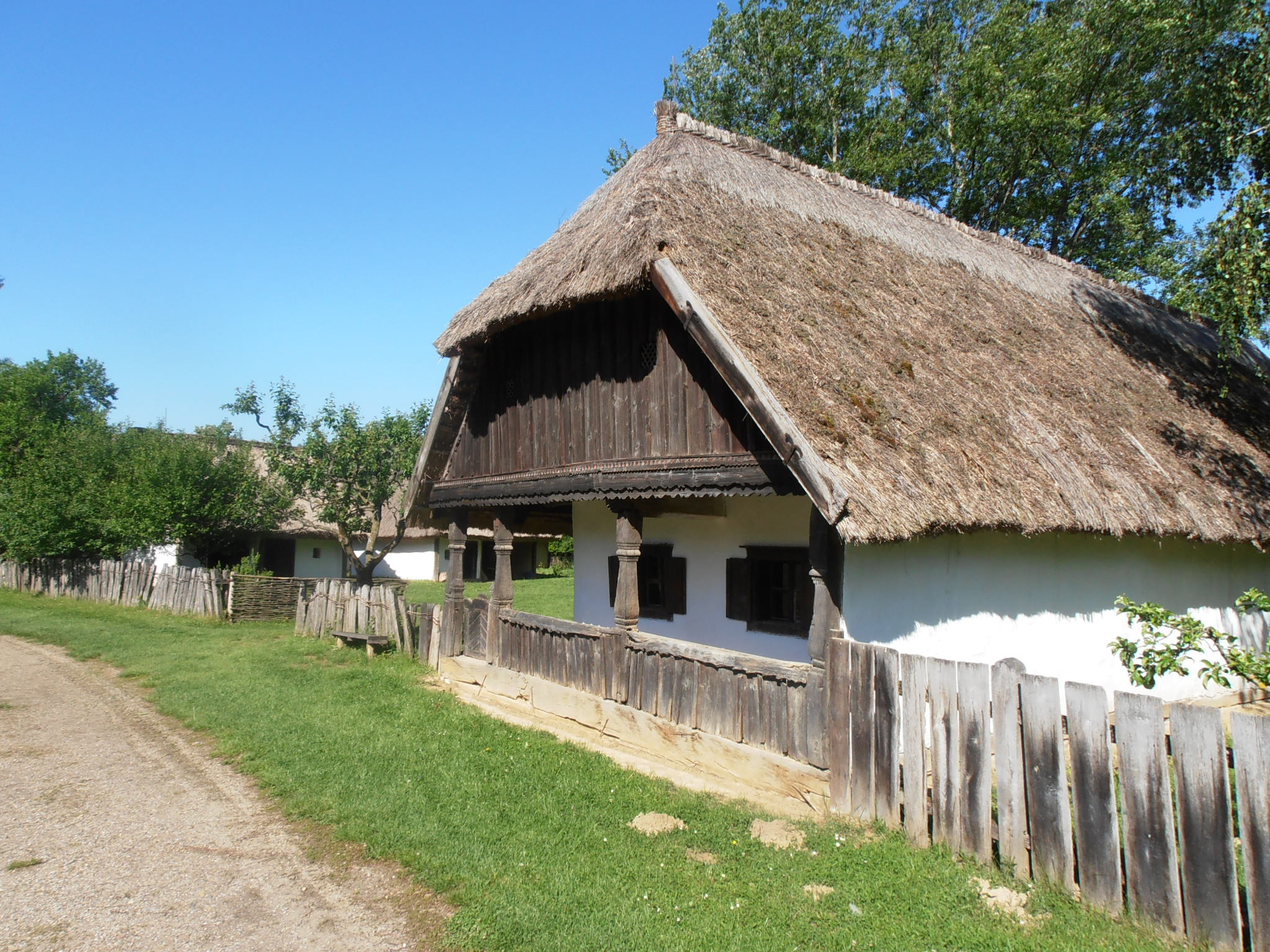
Traditional house in Szenna

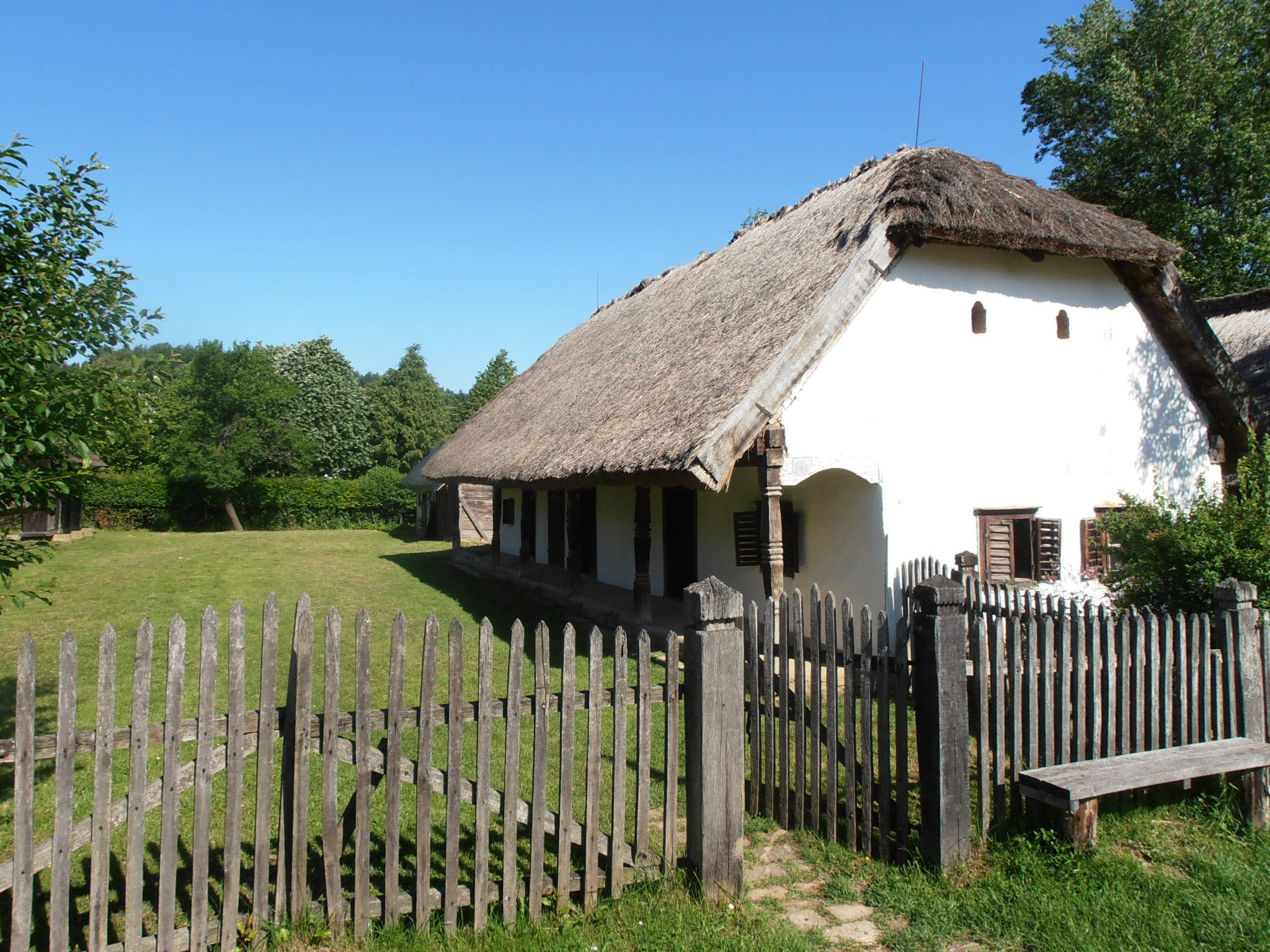
Traditional house in Szenna

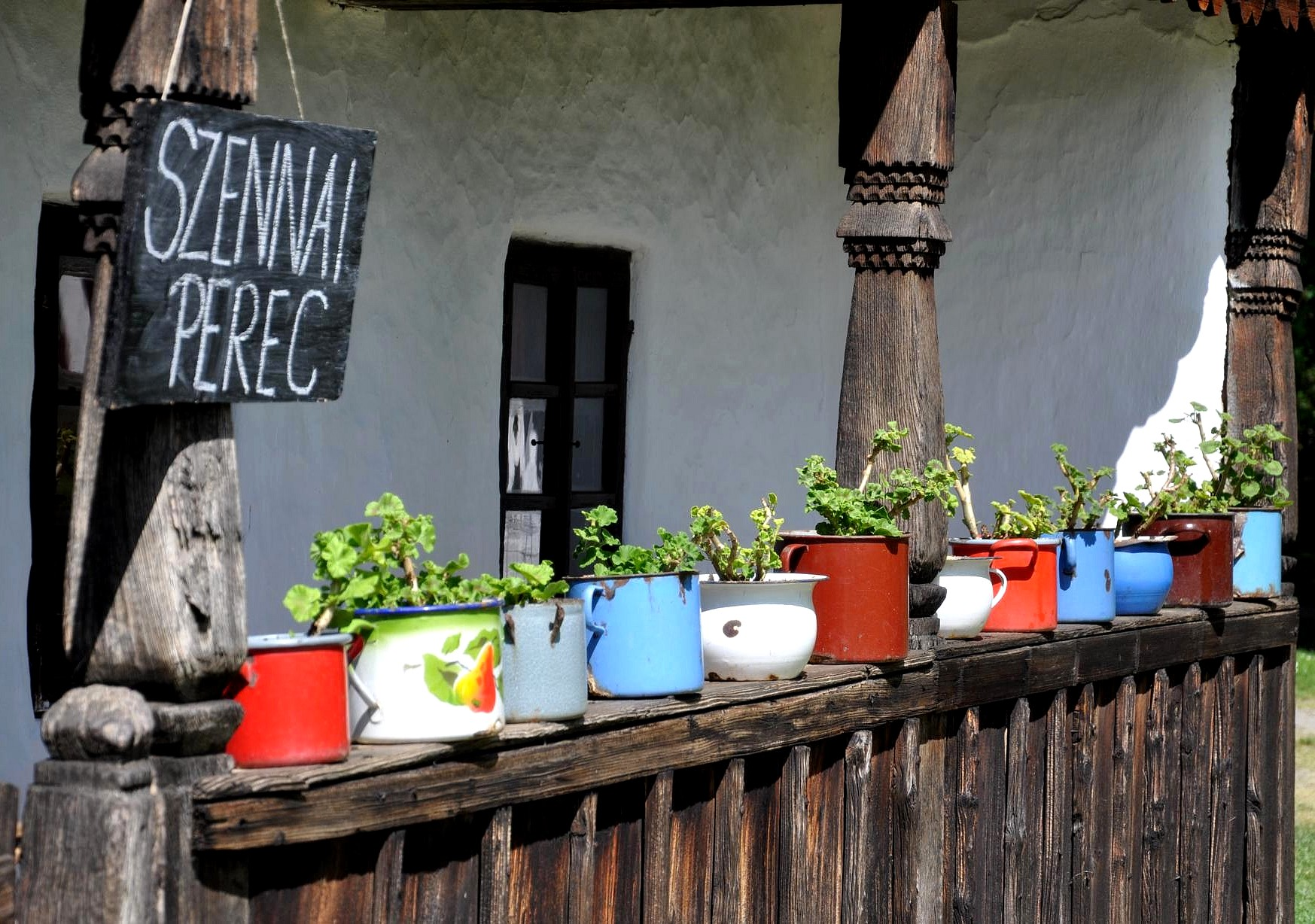
Porch of a traditional house in Szenna

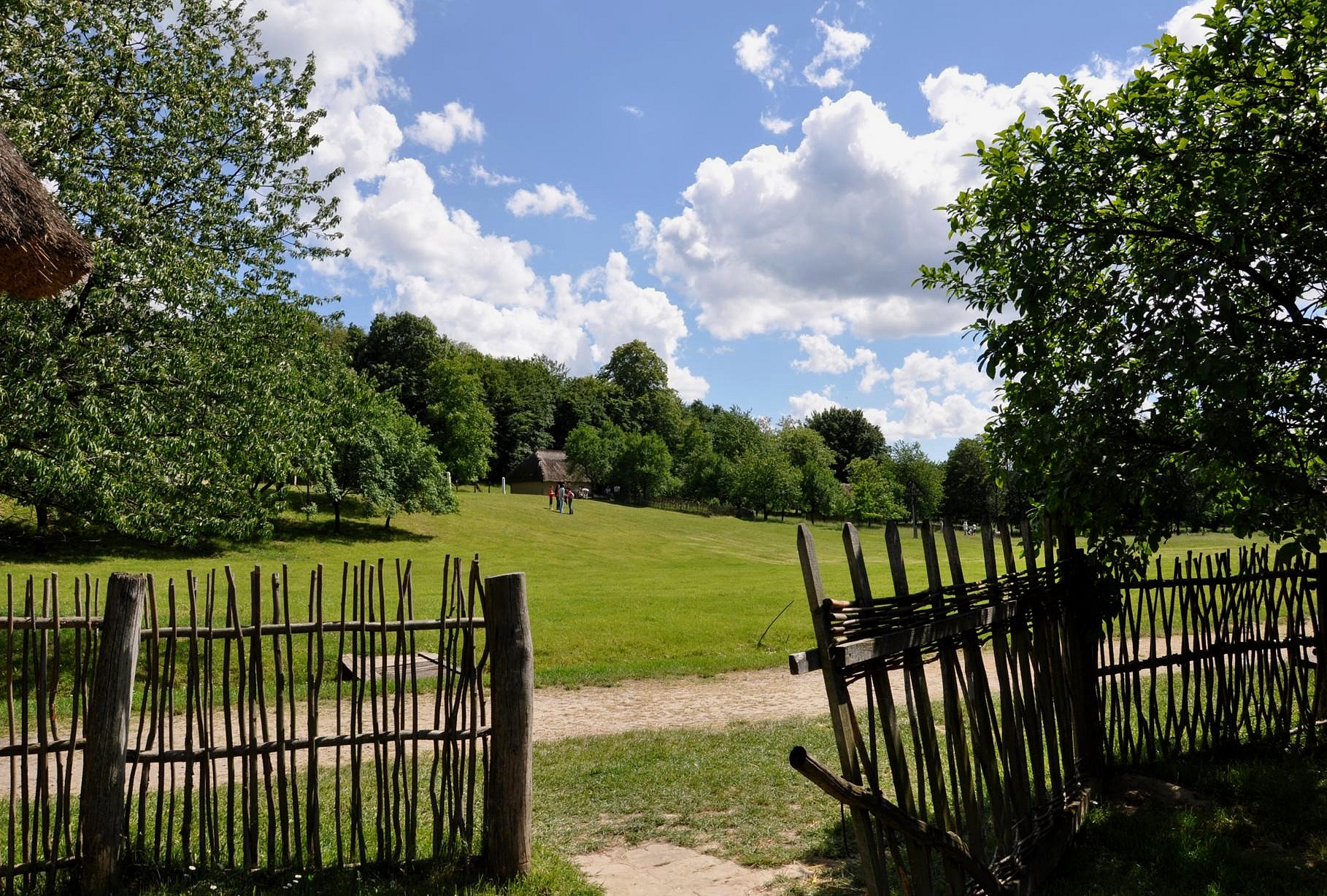
Meadow in Szenna

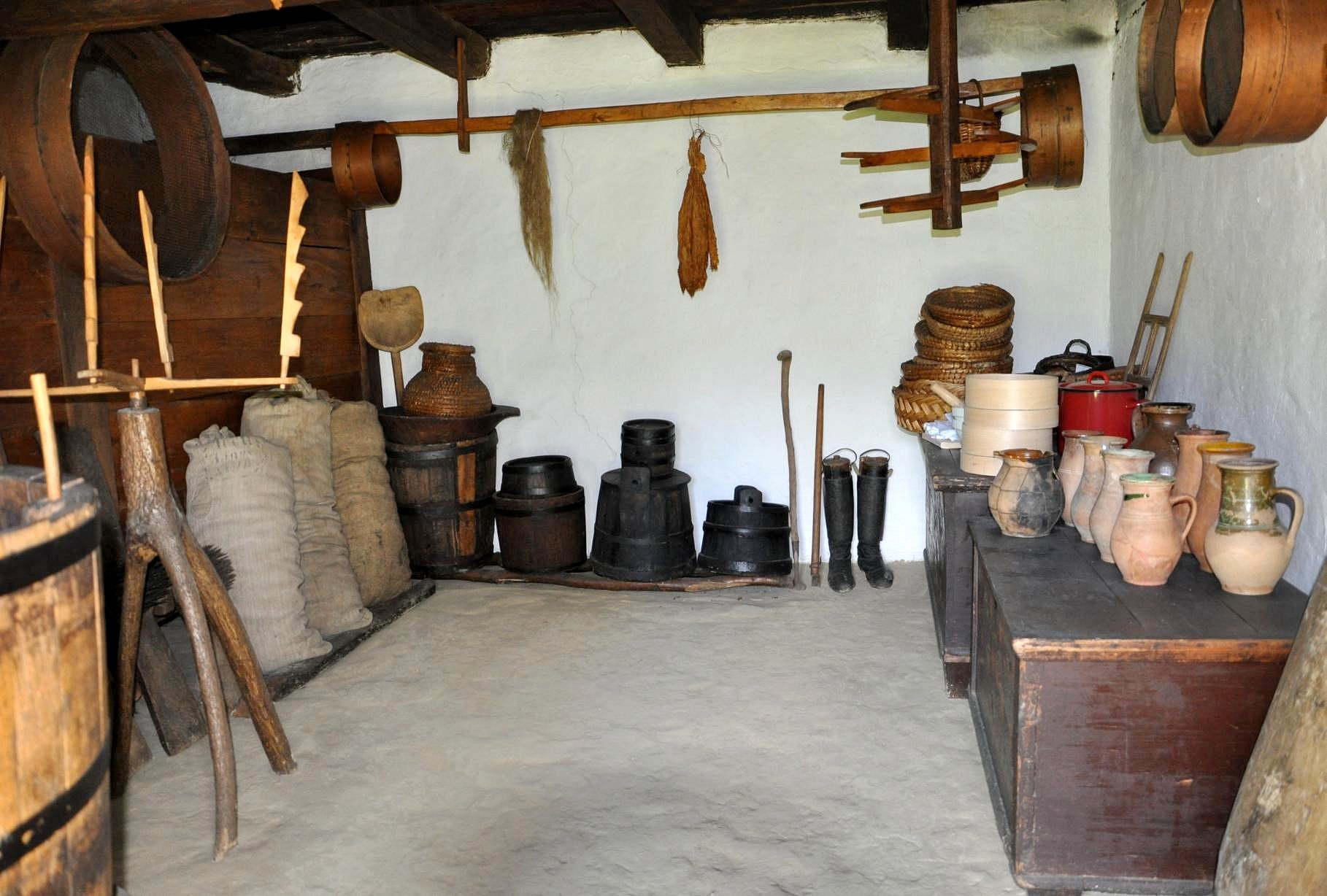
Traditional household items

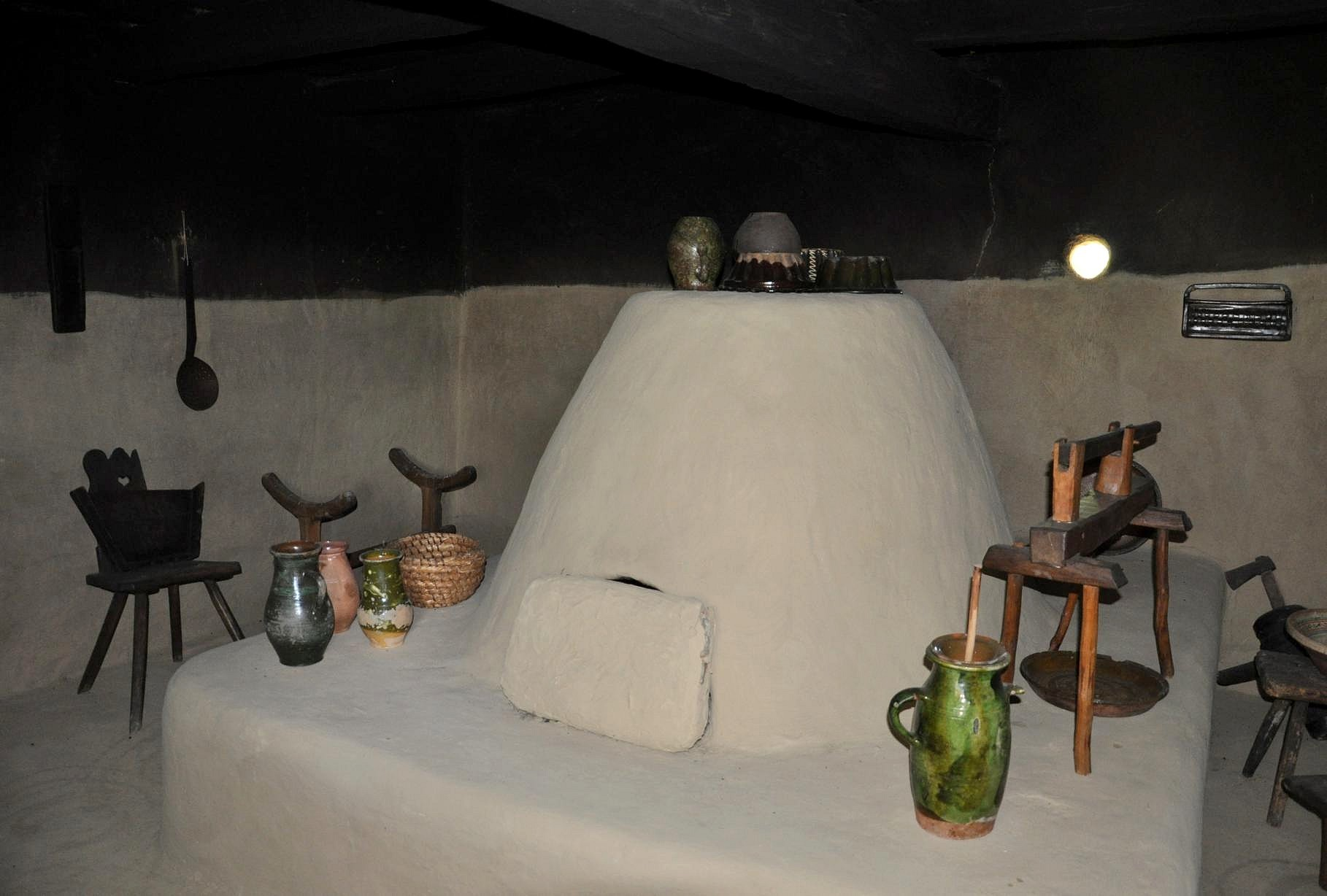
Traditional household items

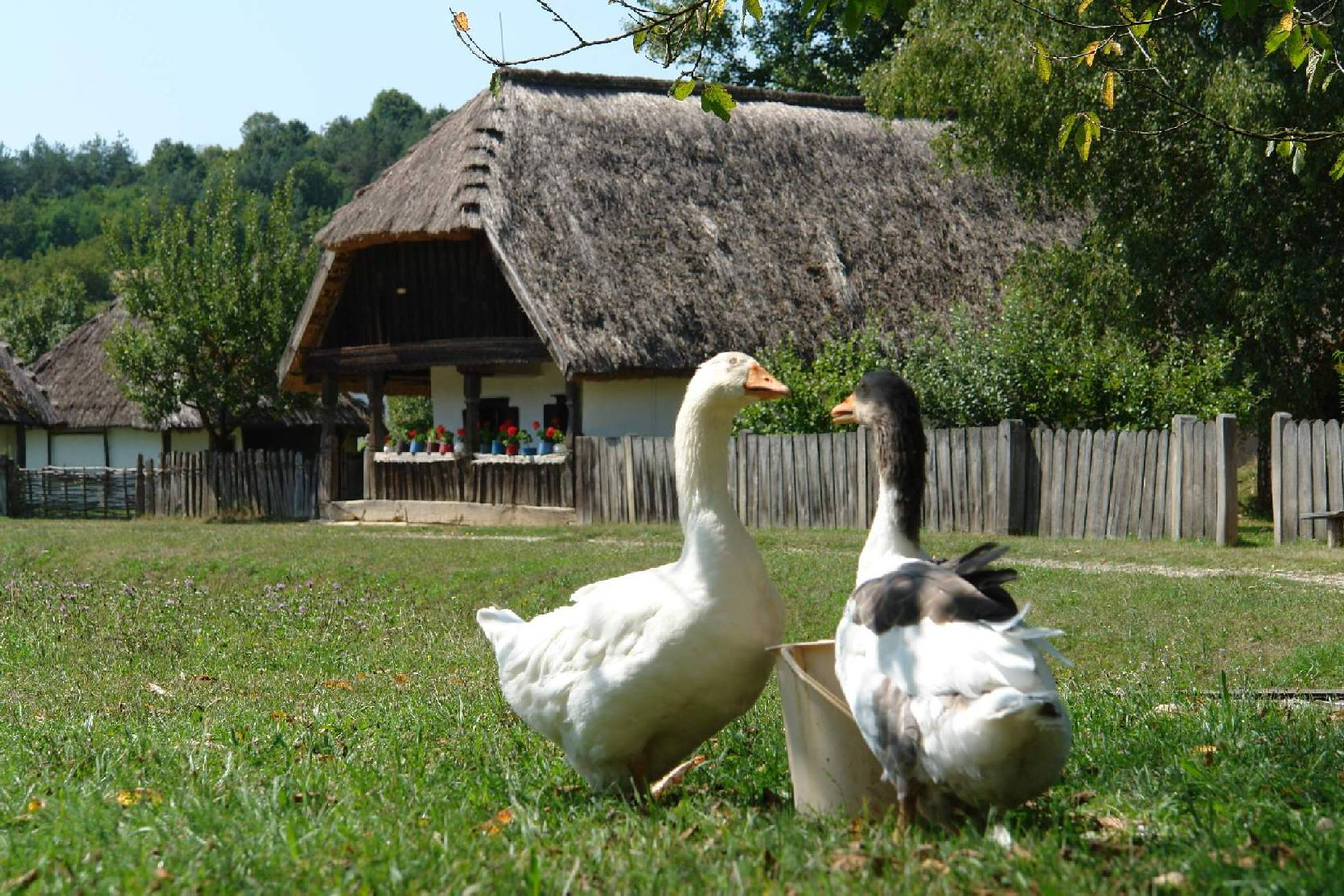
Geese in Szenna
