= Kercseliget =

Kercseliget Gerstleck
- Village
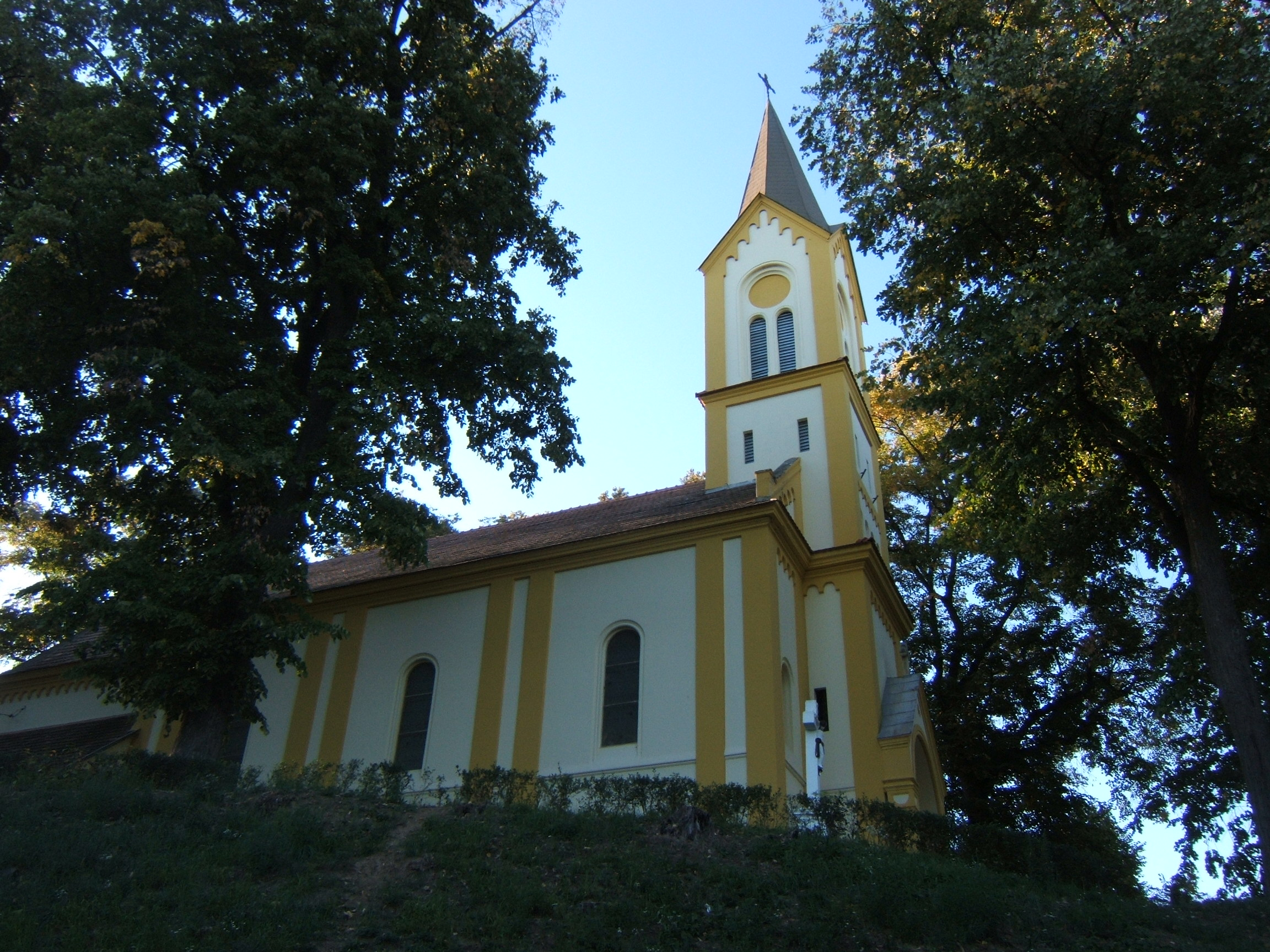
- Saint Stephen of Hungary Church in Kercseliget

- Coat of arms

- Location of Somogy county in Hungary

- Location of Kercseliget
- Coordinates: 46.32800°N 18.06332°E
- Country: Hungary
- Region: Southern Transdanubia
- County: Somogy
- District: Kaposvár
- RC Diocese: Kaposvár

Area
  - Total: 19.47 km^{2} (7.52 sq mi)

Population (2017)
  - Total: 357
  - Density: 18.3/km^{2} (47.5/sq mi)
- Demonym: kercseligeti
- Time zone: UTC+1 (CET)
  - Summer (DST): UTC+2 (CEST)
- Postal code: 7256
- Area code: (+36) 82
- NUTS 3 code: HU232
- MP: Attila Gelencsér (Fidesz)
- Website: Kercseliget Online

Kercseliget (German: Gertsleck or Gerstlek; Croatian: Karčalinj) is a village in Somogy County, southern Hungary.

The settlement is part of the Balatonboglár wine region.

== Etymology ==
There are two theories about the name of the settlement. According to the first one the German residents started to call their village Gartenchen and Parkchen which were translated into Hungarian as kertecske (English: tiny garden) and ligetecske (English: tiny park). According to other sources the name derives from the Hungarian person name Kercse which was added to the second part of the name of the village (liget) which means park in Hungarian.

== Geography ==
It lies at the meeting point of the three counties: Tolna, Baranya and Somogy.

== History ==
It was first mentioned in 1332 without a name. During the Turkish occupation it became uninhabited. In the 18th century Kristóf Nitzky bought the land and invited the Roman Catholic German settlers to Kercseliget. The Madarász and Hunyadi family acquired lands there during that time. Later in 1859 the Maár and Pallavicini families had land near the settlement. Early Kercseliget had a developed industry with a brick factory and weekly market.

== Main sights ==
- Maár Mansion (built at the beginning of the 19th century in Classicist style)
- Roman Catholic Church (built in 1770, rebuilt in 1895)
- Maár Chateau in Bükkpuszta (part of Kercseliget)
- Kercseligeti Gyöngyszemek Gypsie folklore band of the village
- Traditional Choir of Kercseliget
