= Kaposkeresztúr =

- Village
- Coat of arms

- Location of Kaposkeresztúr
- Coordinates: 46.33171°N 17.96549°E
- Country: Hungary
- Region: Southern Transdanubia
- County: Somogy
- District: Kaposvár
- RC Diocese: Kaposvár

Area
  - Total: 19.8 km^{2} (7.6 sq mi)

Population (2017)
  - Total: 351
  - Density: 17.7/km^{2} (45.9/sq mi)
- Demonym(s): keresztúri, kaposkeresztúri
- Time zone: UTC+1 (CET)
  - Summer (DST): UTC+2 (CEST)
- Postal code: 7258
- Area code: (+36) 82
- NUTS 3 code: HU232
- MP: Attila Gelencsér (Fidesz)
- Website: Kaposkeresztúr Online

Kaposkeresztúr is a village in Somogy county, Hungary.

The settlement is part of the Balatonboglár wine region.
