= Kaposújlak =

- Village
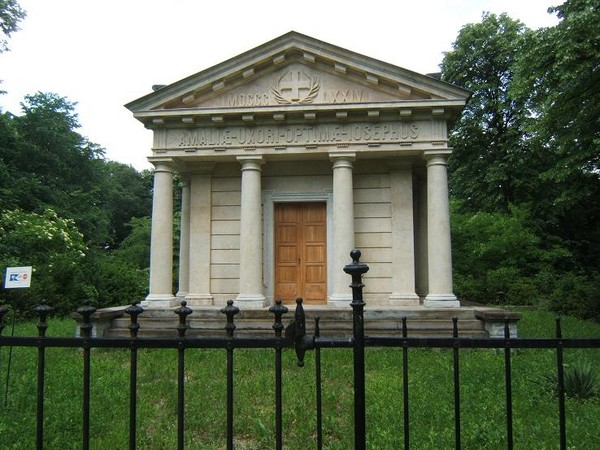
- Somssich Mausoleum in Kaposújlak

- Coat of arms

- Location of Somogy county in Hungary

- Location of Kaposújlak
- Coordinates: 46.36719°N 17.72973°E
- Country: Hungary
- Region: Southern Transdanubia
- County: Somogy
- District: Kaposvár
- RC Diocese: Kaposvár

Area
  - Total: 8.93 km^{2} (3.45 sq mi)

Population (2017)
  - Total: 738
  - Density: 82.6/km^{2} (214/sq mi)
- Demonym(s): újlaki, kaposújlaki
- Time zone: UTC+1 (CET)
  - Summer (DST): UTC+2 (CEST)
- Postal code: 7522
- Area code: (+36) 82
- NUTS 3 code: HU232
- MP: Attila Gelencsér (Fidesz)
- Website: Kaposújlak Online

Kaposújlak is a village in Somogy county, Hungary.
