= Gálosfa =

- Village
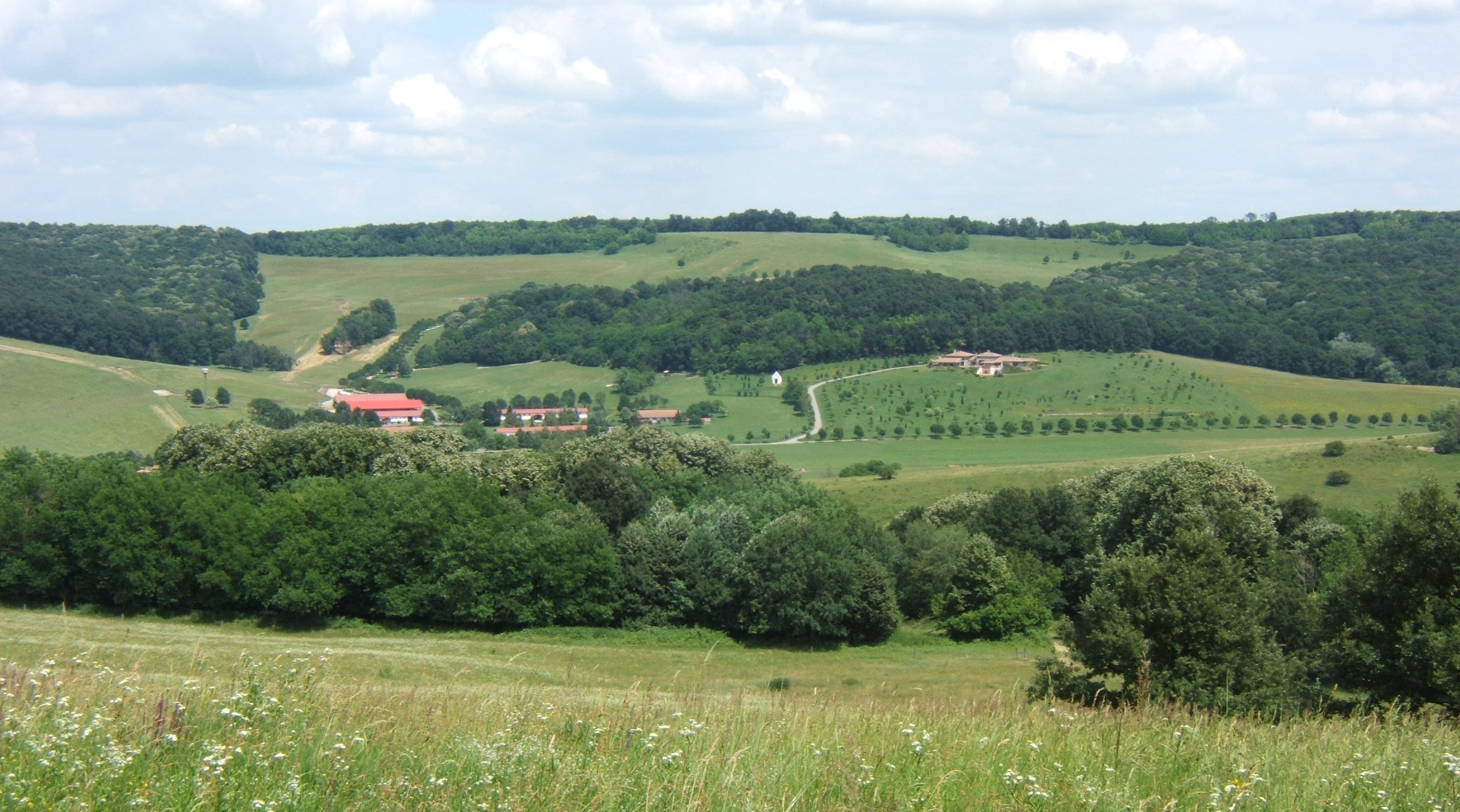
- View of Kistótváros in Gálosfa

- Coat of arms

- Location of Somogy county in Hungary

- Location of Gálosfa
- Coordinates: 46.25459°N 17.88745°E
- Country: Hungary
- Region: Southern Transdanubia
- County: Somogy
- District: Kaposvár
- RC Diocese: Kaposvár

Area
  - Total: 19.76 km^{2} (7.63 sq mi)

Population (2017)
  - Total: 200
  - Density: 10/km^{2} (26/sq mi)
- Demonym: gálosfai
- Time zone: UTC+1 (CET)
  - Summer (DST): UTC+2 (CEST)
- Postal code: 7473
- Area code: (+36) 82
- NUTS 3 code: HU232
- MP: Attila Gelencsér (Fidesz)
- Website: Gálosfa Online

Gálosfa is a village in Somogy county, Hungary.
