= Mosdós =

- Village
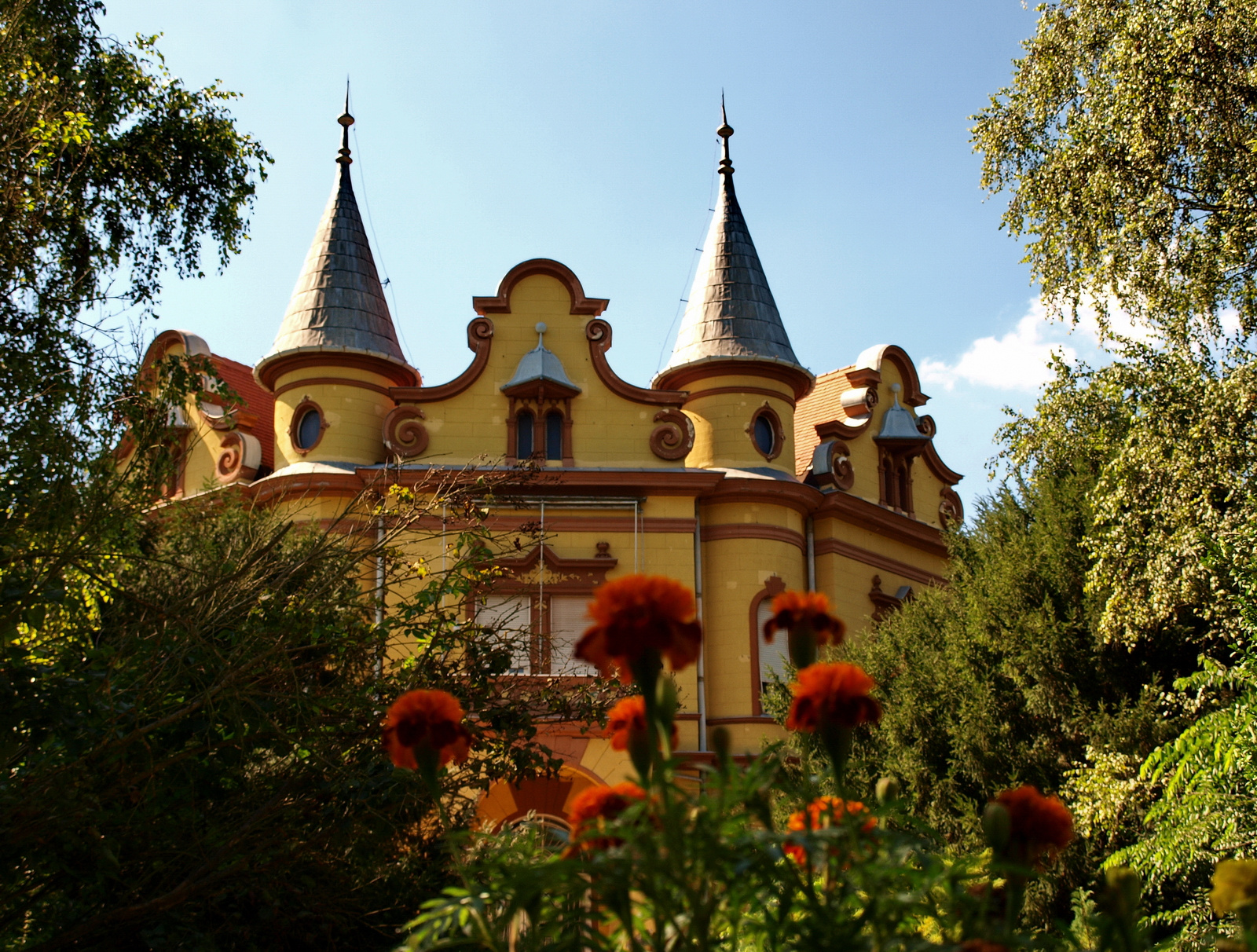
- Pallavicini Mansion in Mosdós

- Coat of arms

- Location of Somogy county in Hungary

- Location of Mosdós
- Coordinates: 46.35831°N 17.98570°E
- Country: Hungary
- Region: Southern Transdanubia
- County: Somogy
- District: Kaposvár
- RC Diocese: Kaposvár

Area
  - Total: 16.95 km^{2} (6.54 sq mi)

Population (2017)
  - Total: 896
  - Density: 52.9/km^{2} (137/sq mi)
- Demonym: mosdósi
- Time zone: UTC+1 (CET)
  - Summer (DST): UTC+2 (CEST)
- Postal code: 7257
- Area code: (+36) 82
- NUTS 3 code: HU232
- MP: Attila Gelencsér (Fidesz)
- Website: Mosdós Online

Mosdós is a village in Somogy county, Hungary.

The settlement is part of the Balatonboglár wine region.
