= Simonfa =

- Village
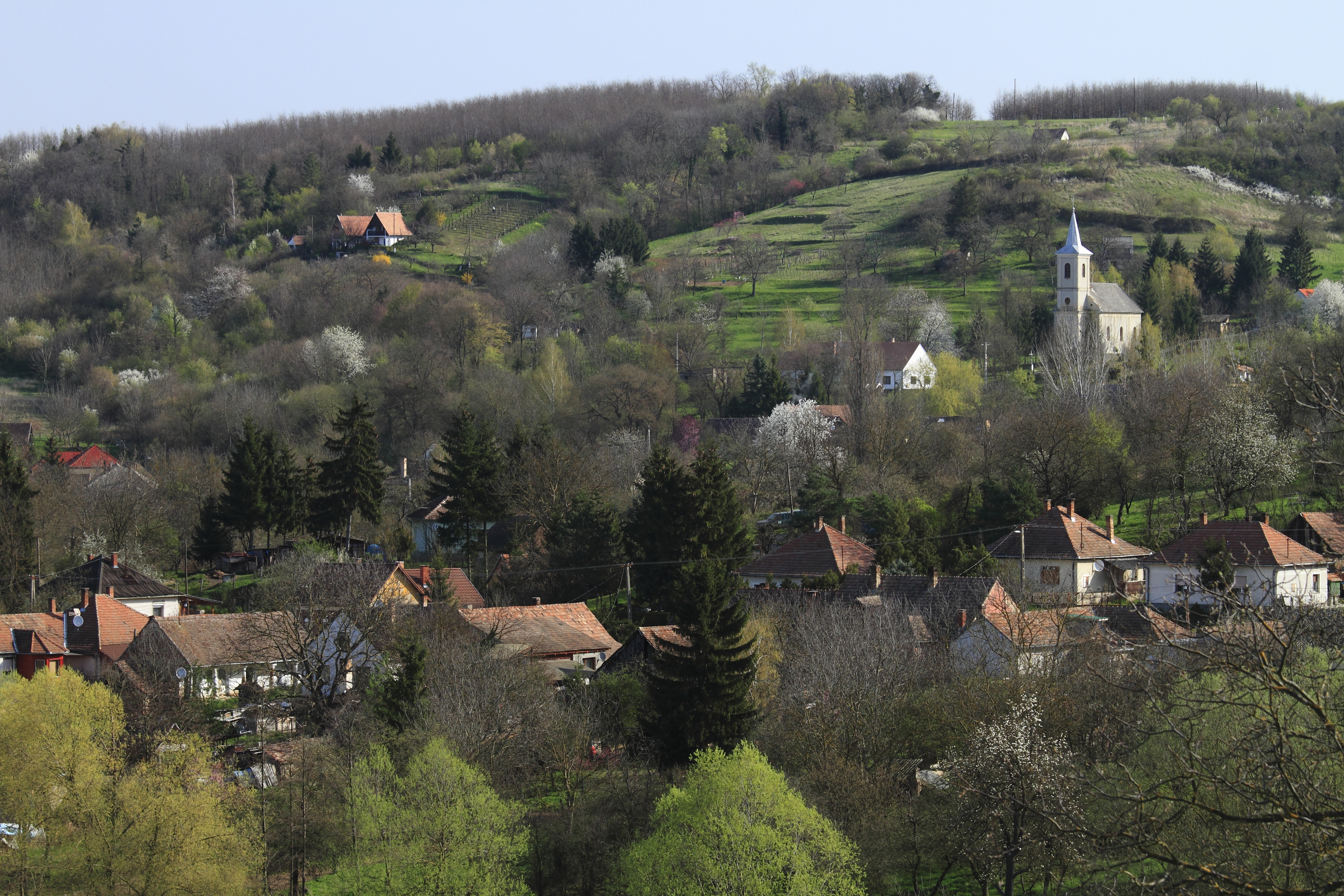
- View of Simonfa from Road 67

- Location of Simonfa in Hungary
- Coordinates: 46°17′01″N 17°49′23″E
- Country: Hungary
- Region: Southern Transdanubia
- County: Somogy County
- District: Kaposvár
- RC Diocese: Kaposvár

Government
  - Mayor: Gábor Bodrog (Fidesz-KDNP)

Area
  - Total: 11 km^{2} (4.2 sq mi)

Population (2017)
  - Total: 349
  - Density: 32/km^{2} (82/sq mi)
- Demonym: simonfai
- Time zone: UTC+1 (CET)
  - Summer (DST): UTC+2 (CEST)
- Postal code: 7474
- Area code: (+36) 82
- NUTS 3 code: HU232
- MP: Attila Gelencsér (Fidesz)
- Website: Simonfa Online

Simonfa is a village in Somogy County, Hungary.

== History ==
According to László Szita the settlement was completely Hungarian in the 18th century.
