= Kaposhomok =

Kaposhomok Hommigg (in German)
- Village
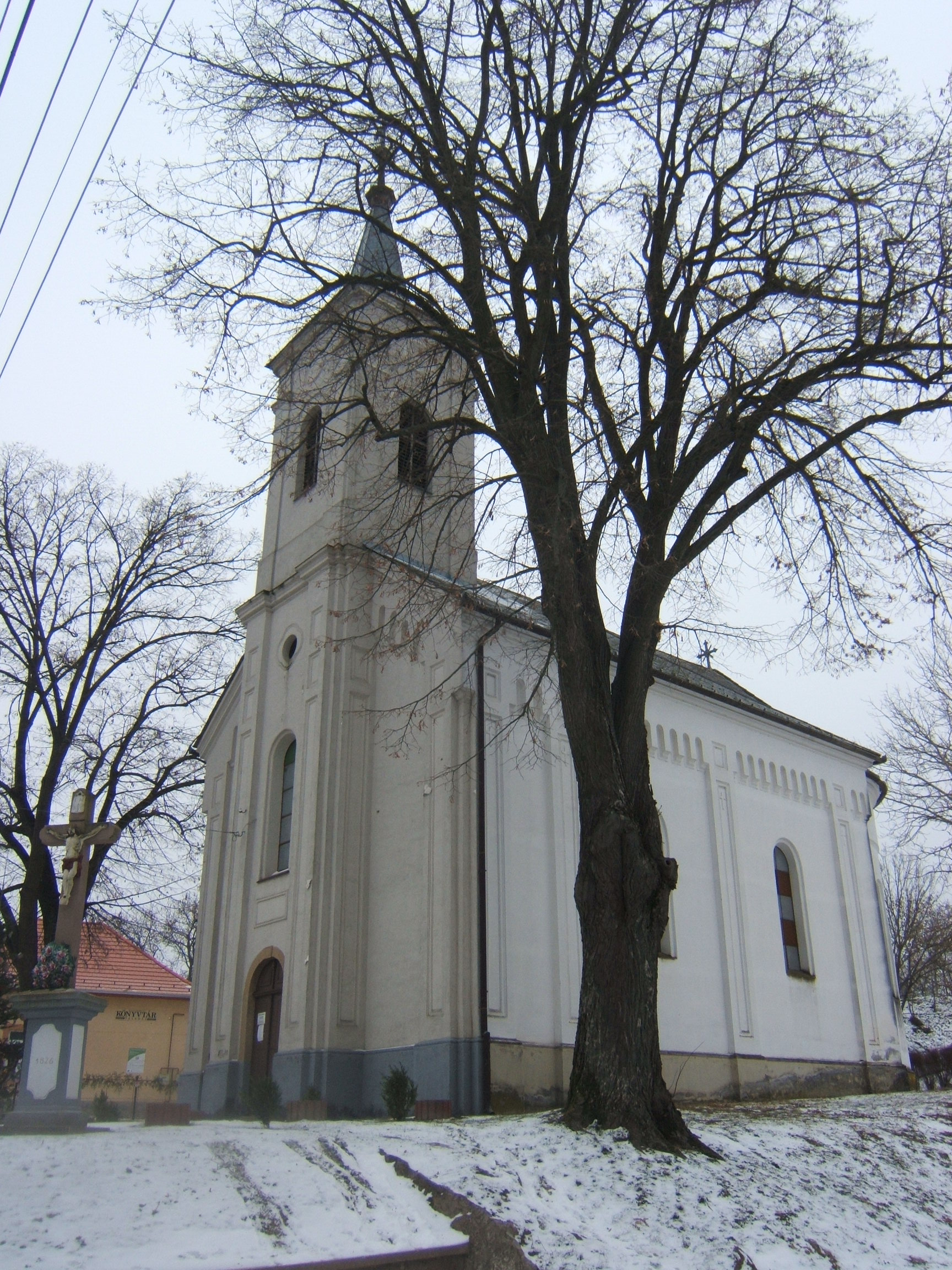
- Saint Wendelin Church in Kaposhomok

- Coat of arms

- Location of Somogy county in Hungary

- Location of Kaposhomok
- Coordinates: 46.35883°N 17.92476°E
- Country: Hungary
- Region: Southern Transdanubia
- County: Somogy
- District: Kaposvár
- RC Diocese: Kaposvár

Area
  - Total: 11.48 km^{2} (4.43 sq mi)

Population (2017)
  - Total: 452
  - Density: 39.4/km^{2} (102/sq mi)
- Demonym: kaposhomoki
- Time zone: UTC+1 (CET)
  - Summer (DST): UTC+2 (CEST)
- Postal code: 7261
- Area code: (+36) 82
- NUTS 3 code: HU232
- MP: Attila Gelencsér (Fidesz)
- Website: Kaposhomok Online

Kaposhomok (German: Hommigg) is a village in Somogy county, Hungary.

The settlement is part of the Balatonboglár wine region.
