= Hajmás =

- Village
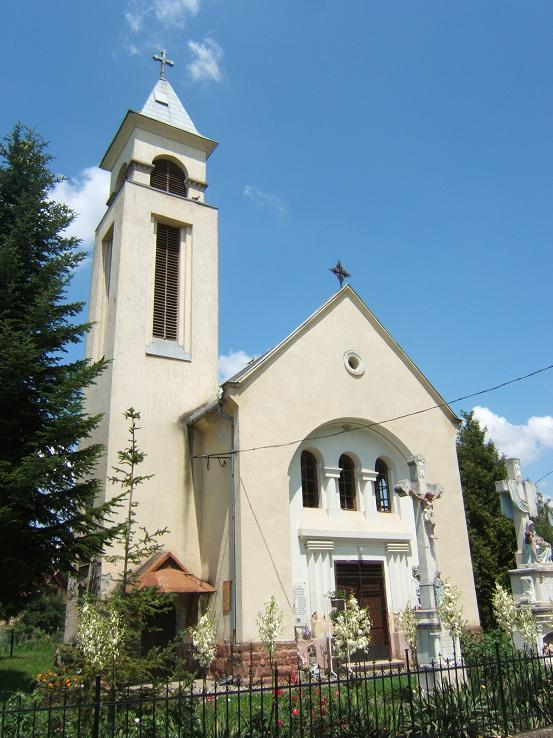
- Miasszonyunk-templom (English: Our Lady Church) in Hajmás

- Coat of arms

- Location of Somogy county in Hungary

- Location of Hajmás
- Coordinates: 46.27482°N 17.91148°E
- Country: Hungary
- Region: Southern Transdanubia
- County: Somogy
- District: Kaposvár
- RC Diocese: Kaposvár

Area
  - Total: 11.11 km^{2} (4.29 sq mi)

Population (2017)
  - Total: 226
  - Density: 20.3/km^{2} (52.7/sq mi)
- Demonym: hajmási
- Time zone: UTC+1 (CET)
  - Summer (DST): UTC+2 (CEST)
- Postal code: 7473
- Area code: (+36) 82
- NUTS 3 code: HU232
- MP: Attila Gelencsér (Fidesz)
- Website: Hajmás Online

Hajmás is a village in Somogy county, Hungary.
