= Böhönye =

- Village
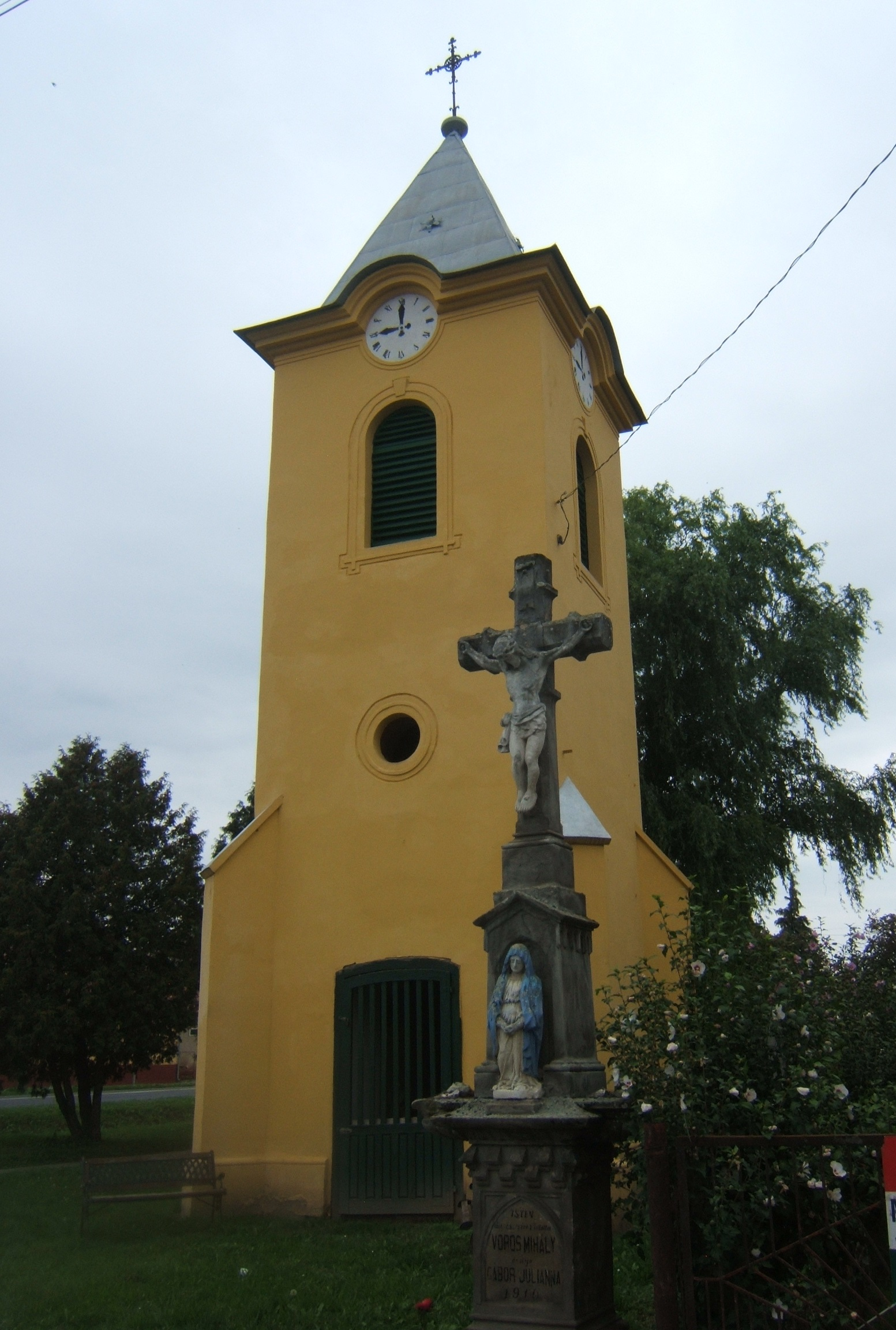
- Bell tower with stone cross in Böhönye

- Coat of arms

- Location of Somogy county in Hungary

- Location of Böhönye
- Coordinates: 46.41186°N 17.39291°E
- Country: Hungary
- Region: Southern Transdanubia
- County: Somogy
- District: Marcali
- RC Diocese: Kaposvár

Area
  - Total: 64.17 km^{2} (24.78 sq mi)

Population (2017)
  - Total: 2,230
  - Density: 34.8/km^{2} (90.0/sq mi)
- Demonym: böhönyei
- Time zone: UTC+1 (CET)
  - Summer (DST): UTC+2 (CEST)
- Postal code: 8719
- Area code: (+36) 85
- NUTS 3 code: HU232
- MP: József Attila Móring (KDNP)
- Website: Böhönye Online

Böhönye is a village in Somogy county, Hungary.

The settlement is part of the Balatonboglár wine region.

== Etymology ==
Its name derives from the given name Buhun which got an -é suffix which meant, in the form Buhuné, that the village belonged to him.

== History ==
Böhönye is a settlement dating from at least 1536, when it was first seen in historical records.

During World War II, Böhönye was captured by Soviet troops of the 3rd Ukrainian Front on 30 March 1945 in the course of the Vienna Offensive.
