= Somogyzsitfa =

Somogyzsitfa Somogyfehéregyháza and Felsőzsitva (until 1950)
- Village
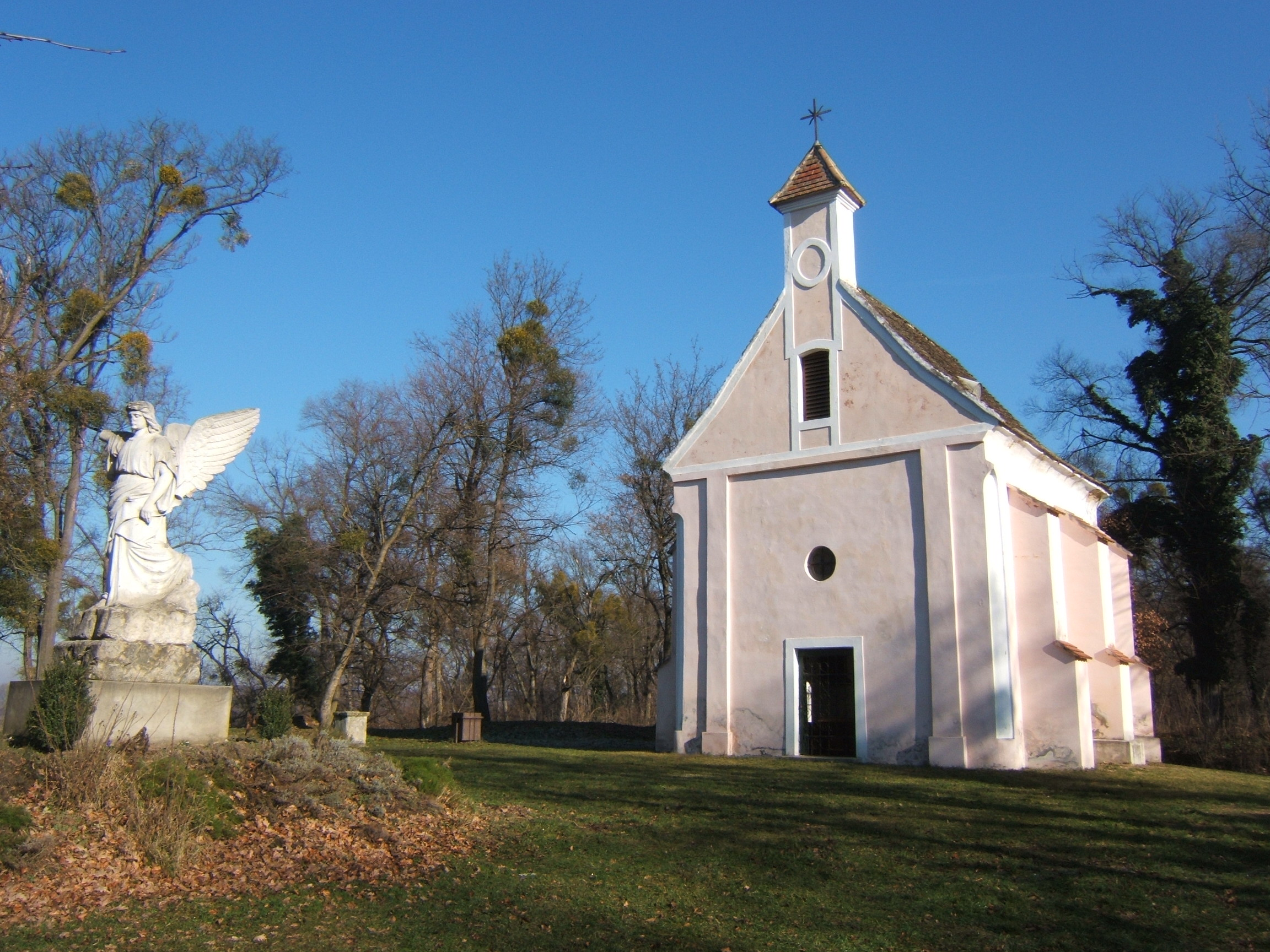
- Chapel of Szőcsénypuszta

- Location of Somogy county in Hungary

- Location of Somogyzsitfa
- Coordinates: 46.5483°N 17.30046°E
- Country: Hungary
- Region: Southern Transdanubia
- County: Somogy
- District: Marcali
- RC Diocese: Kaposvár

Area
  - Total: 27.22 km^{2} (10.51 sq mi)

Population (2017)
  - Total: 583
  - Density: 21.4/km^{2} (55.5/sq mi)
- Demonym(s): zsitfai, somogyzsitfai
- Time zone: UTC+1 (CET)
  - Summer (DST): UTC+2 (CEST)
- Postal code: 8734
- Area code: (+36) 85
- NUTS 3 code: HU232
- MP: József Attila Móring (KDNP)
- Website: Somogyzsitva Online

Somogyzsitfa (until 1950 as Somogyfehéregyháza and Felsőzsitva) is a village in Somogy county, Hungary. It consists of the two former villages of Somogyfehéregyháza and Felsőzsitva.

The settlement is part of the Balatonboglár wine region.

== Etymology ==
Somogyfehéregyháza (English: Somogy white house) got its name after its whitewashed buildings or church during the Middle Ages. The name of Felsőzsitva consists of the Hungarian felső (English: upper) and the South Slavic zsitva (Hungarian: gabona, English: grain).
