= Nagyberki =

- Village
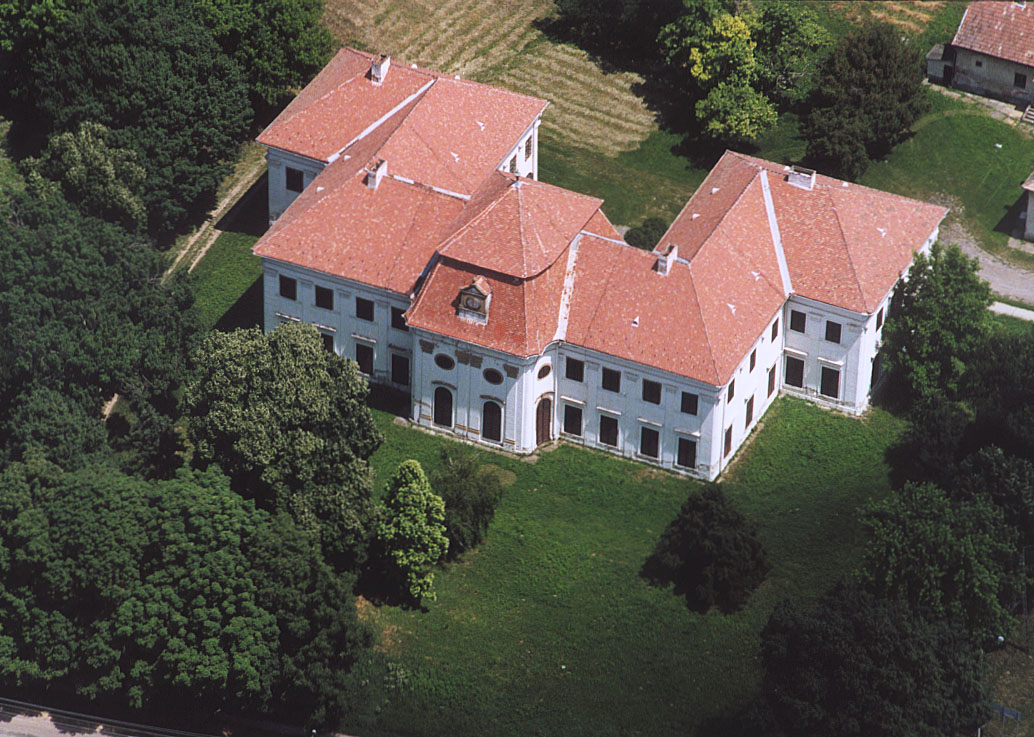
- Schmiddeg-Vigyázó Mansion in Nagyberki

- Coat of arms

- Location of Somogy county in Hungary

- Location of Nagyberki
- Coordinates: 46.36121°N 18.00760°E
- Country: Hungary
- Region: Southern Transdanubia
- County: Somogy
- District: Kaposvár
- RC Diocese: Kaposvár

Area
  - Total: 21.74 km^{2} (8.39 sq mi)

Population (2017)
  - Total: 1,441
  - Density: 66.28/km^{2} (171.7/sq mi)
- Demonym: nagyberki
- Time zone: UTC+1 (CET)
  - Summer (DST): UTC+2 (CEST)
- Postal code: 7255
- Area code: (+36) 82
- NUTS 3 code: HU232
- MP: Attila Gelencsér (Fidesz)
- Website: Nagyberki Online

Nagyberki is a village in Somogy county, Hungary.

The settlement is part of the Balatonboglár wine region.
