= Somogysámson =

- Village
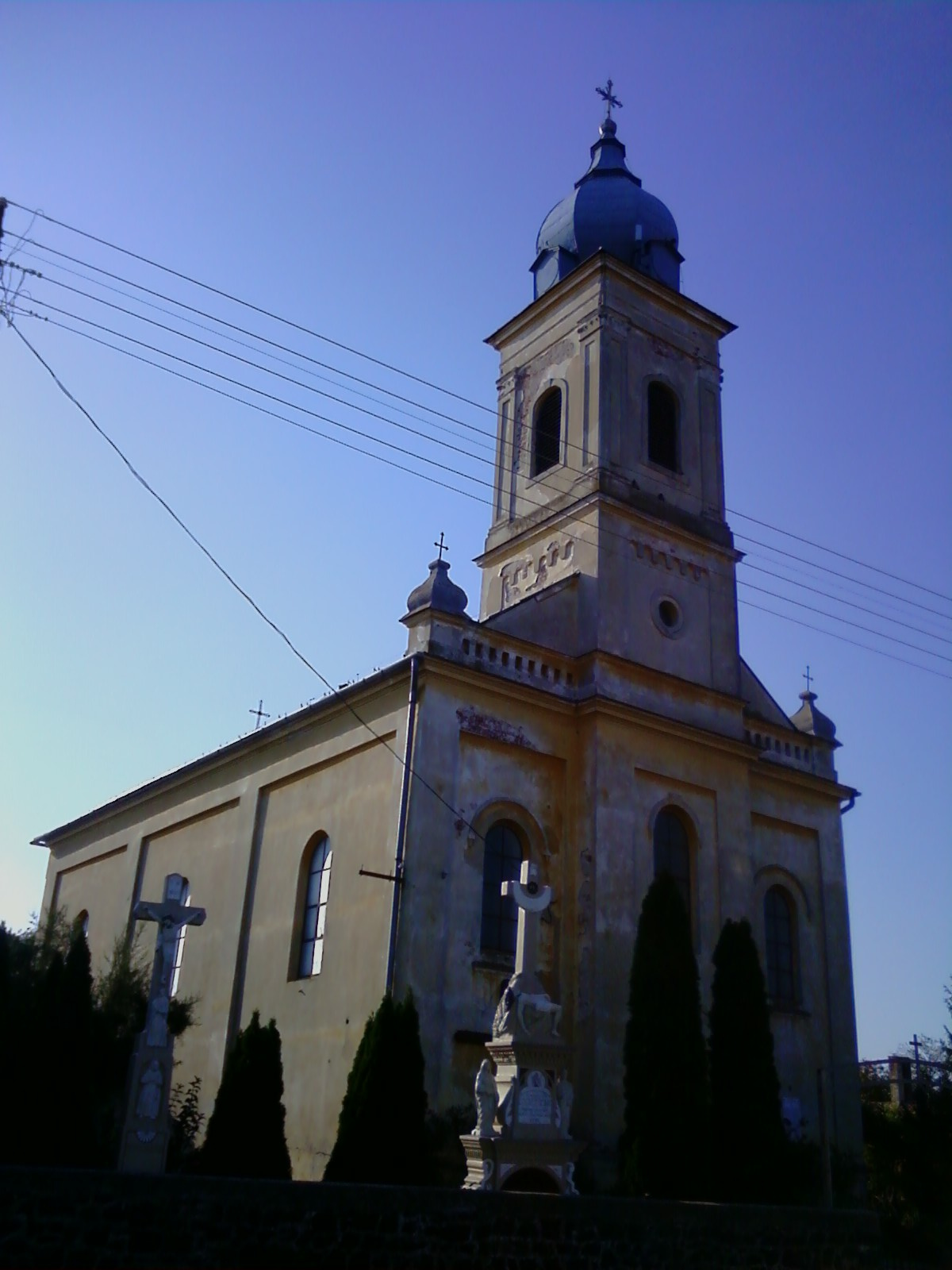
- Urunk Mennybemenetele-templom (English: Ascension of Jesus Christ Church) in Somogysámson

- Coat of arms

- Location of Somogy county in Hungary

- Location of Somogysámson
- Coordinates: 46.59044°N 17.29701°E
- Country: Hungary
- Region: Southern Transdanubia
- County: Somogy
- District: Marcali
- RC Diocese: Kaposvár

Area
  - Total: 22.83 km^{2} (8.81 sq mi)

Population (2017)
  - Total: 712
  - Density: 31.2/km^{2} (80.8/sq mi)
- Demonym(s): sámsoni, somogysámsoni
- Time zone: UTC+1 (CET)
  - Summer (DST): UTC+2 (CEST)
- Postal code: 8733
- Area code: (+36) 85
- Motorways: M7
- Distance from Budapest: 181 km (112 mi) Northeast
- NUTS 3 code: HU232
- MP: József Attila Móring (KDNP)
- Website: Somogysámson Online

Somogysámson is a village in Somogy county, Hungary.

The settlement is part of the Balatonboglár wine region.
