= Juta =

- Village
- Coat of arms

- Location of Somogy county in Hungary

- Location of Juta
- Coordinates: 46.40815°N 17.73008°E
- Country: Hungary
- Region: Southern Transdanubia
- County: Somogy
- District: Kaposvár
- RC Diocese: Kaposvár

Area
  - Total: 19.23 km^{2} (7.42 sq mi)

Population (2017)
  - Total: 1,120
  - Density: 58.2/km^{2} (151/sq mi)
- Demonym: jutai
- Time zone: UTC+1 (CET)
  - Summer (DST): UTC+2 (CEST)
- Postal code: 7431
- Area code: (+36) 82
- NUTS 3 code: HU232
- MP: Attila Gelencsér (Fidesz)
- Website: Juta Online

Juta is a village in Somogy county, Hungary.
