= Sántos =

- Village
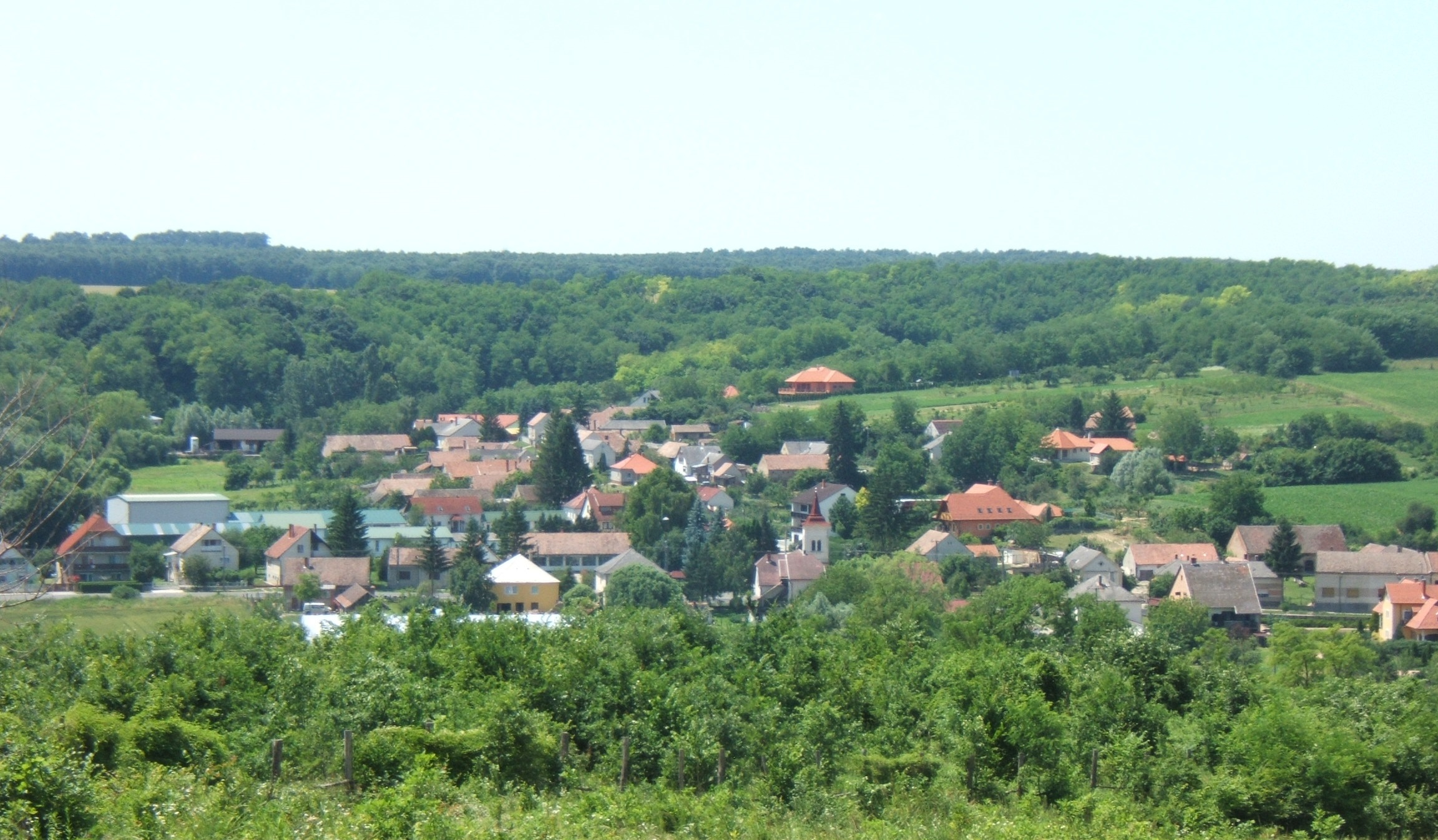
- View of Sántos

- Location of Somogy county in Hungary

- Location of Sántos
- Coordinates: 46.34792°N 17.88004°E
- Country: Hungary
- Region: Southern Transdanubia
- County: Somogy
- District: Kaposvár
- RC Diocese: Kaposvár

Area
  - Total: 11.38 km^{2} (4.39 sq mi)

Population (2017)
  - Total: 521
  - Density: 45.8/km^{2} (119/sq mi)
- Demonym: sántosi
- Time zone: UTC+1 (CET)
  - Summer (DST): UTC+2 (CEST)
- Postal code: 7479
- Area code: (+36) 82
- NUTS 3 code: HU232
- MP: Attila Gelencsér (Fidesz)
- Website: Sántos Online

Sántos is a village in Somogy county, Hungary.

== History ==
According to László Szita the settlement was completely Hungarian in the 18th century.
