= Balatonboglár wine region =

Wine region in Hungary

- Wine region
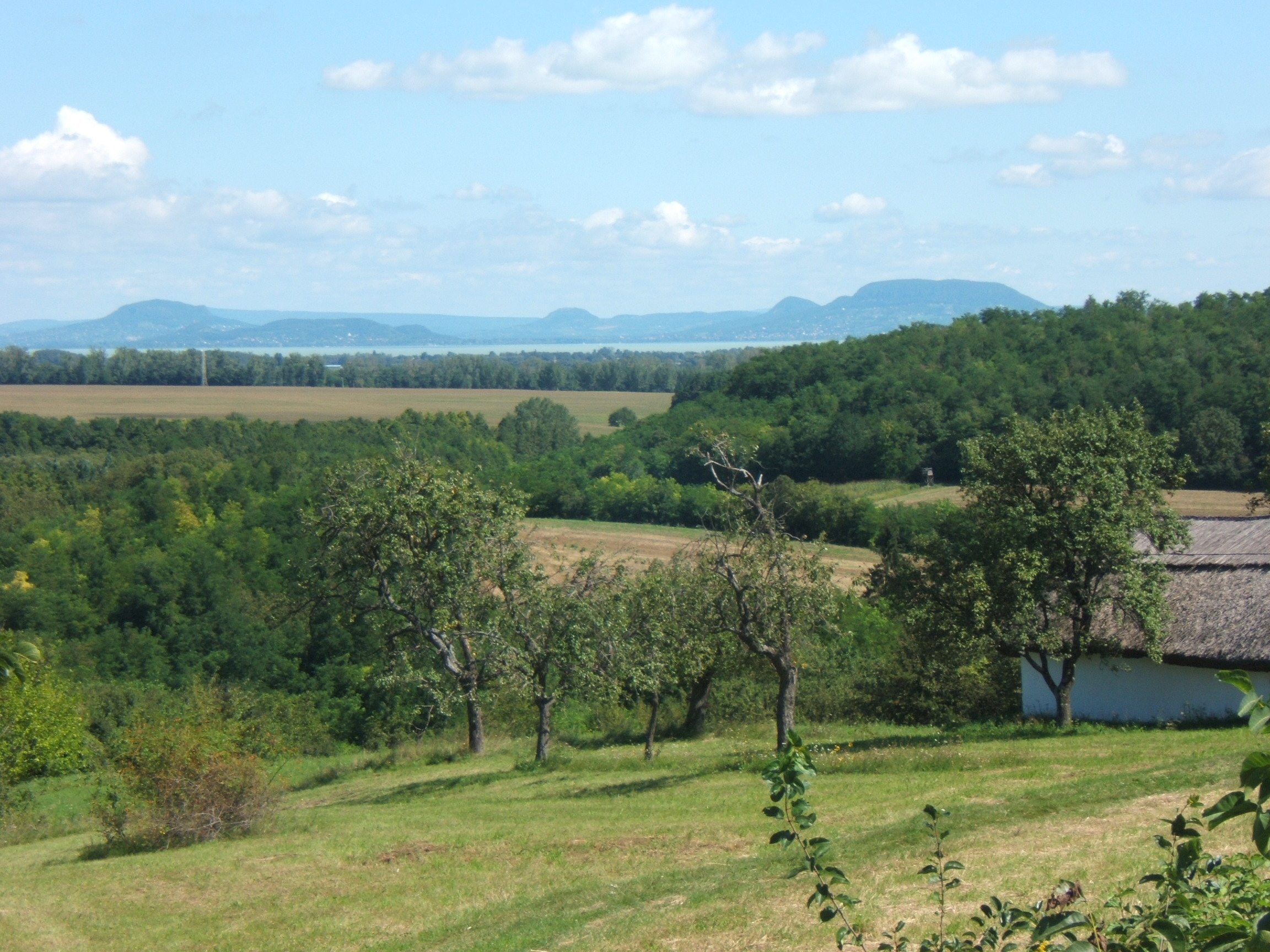
- Panorama on the vineyard hill of Kéthely
- Other names: Balatonboglár borvidék
- Country: Hungary
- Part of: Balaton wine region
- Sub-regions: Somogy County
- Soil conditions: loess sometimes with high limestone content sometimes mixed with stone and clay
- Total area: 9,980 ha
- Size of planted vineyards: 3,200 – 3,250 ha
- Grapes produced: whitegrapes (Muskotály, Szürkebarát, Chardonnay, Sauvignon blanc, Olaszrizling, Királyleányka, Tramini, Irsai Olivér, Grüner Veltliner, Zenit, Semillon) Concord grapes (Merlot, Pinot noir, Kékfrankos, Kékoportó, Cabernet sauvignon, Zweigelt, Syrah)

The Balatonboglár wine region (Hungarian pronunciation: [ˈbɒlɒtomboglaːr]), also known as the South Balaton wine region, is the only wine region in Somogy County, Hungary. The area consists of 37 settlements, mainly located on the southern shore of Lake Balaton, but also some near Kaposvár like Böhönye, Csurgó and Nagyberki. It is part of the greater Balaton wine region.

Approximately two-thirds of the 3200 hectare vineyards of the wine region are white grapes and the remaining are Concord grapes. Champagne production plays an important role in the area as well.

The Winemaker of the Year award has been given three times to winemakers of the region since its founding: to Vencel Garamvári in 2006, to János Konyári in 2008 and to Ottó Légli in 2010.

== Settlements ==
The 37 settlements in the wine region are:

South Balaton, North Somogy: Andocs, Balatonberény, Balatonboglár, Balatonendréd, Balatonkeresztúr, Balatonlelle, Balatonőszöd, Balatonszabadi, Balatonszárszó, Balatonszemes, Gyugy, Hollád, Karád, Kéthely, Kőröshegy, Kötcse, Látrány, Lengyeltóti, Marcali, Ordacsehi, Somogysámson, Somogytur, Somogyzsitfa, Szólád, Szőlősgyörök, Teleki, Visz, Zamárdi

The area of Nagyberki: Csoma, Kaposhomok, Kaposkeresztúr, Kercseliget, Mosdós, Nagyberki, Szabadi

Other: Böhönye, Csurgó

== See also ==
- Hungarian wine
- Balaton wine region
