= Kaposszerdahely =

- Village
- Flag Coat of arms

- Location of Kaposszerdahely
- Coordinates: 46.32254°N 17.75723°E
- Country: Hungary
- Region: Southern Transdanubia
- County: Somogy
- District: Kaposvár
- RC Diocese: Kaposvár

Area
  - Total: 8.85 km^{2} (3.42 sq mi)

Population (2017)
  - Total: 909
  - Density: 103/km^{2} (266/sq mi)
- Demonym(s): szerdahelyi, kaposszerdahelyi
- Time zone: UTC+1 (CET)
  - Summer (DST): UTC+2 (CEST)
- Postal code: 7476
- Area code: (+36) 82
- NUTS 3 code: HU232
- MP: Attila Gelencsér (Fidesz)
- Website: Kaposszerdahely Online

Kaposszerdahely is a village in Somogy county, Hungary.
