= Csoma, Hungary =

Csoma
- Village
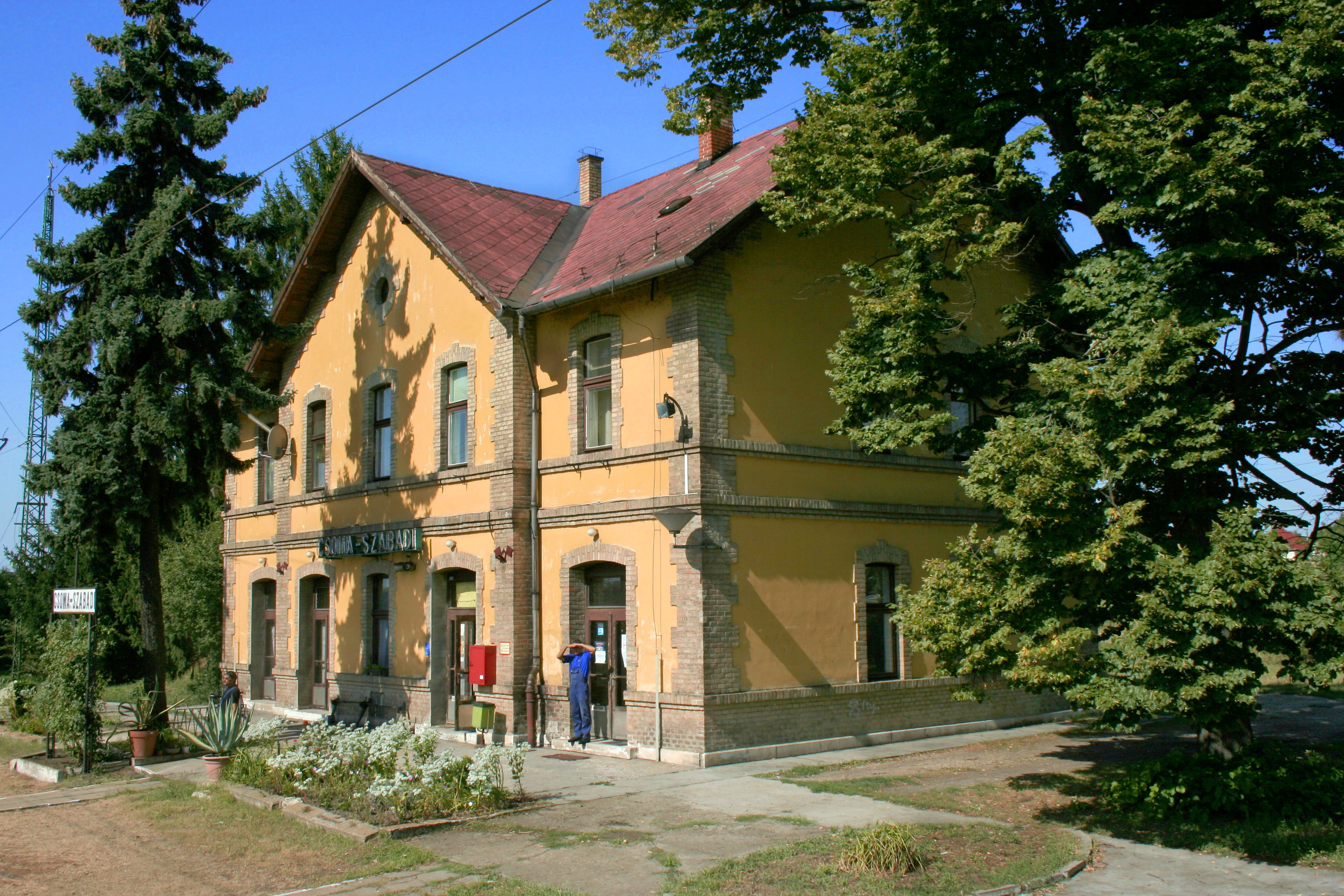
- Train station in Csoma

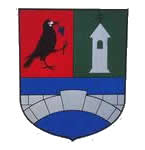
- Coat of arms

- Location of Somogy county in Hungary

- Location of Csoma
- Coordinates: 46.37110°N 18.04939°E
- Country: Hungary
- Region: Southern Transdanubia
- County: Somogy
- District: Kaposvár
- RC Diocese: Kaposvár

Area
  - Total: 8.43 km^{2} (3.25 sq mi)

Population (2017)
  - Total: 415
  - Density: 49.2/km^{2} (128/sq mi)
- Demonym: csomai
- Time zone: UTC+1 (CET)
  - Summer (DST): UTC+2 (CEST)
- Postal code: 7253
- Area code: (+36) 82
- NUTS 3 code: HU232
- MP: Attila Gelencsér (Fidesz)
- Website: Csoma Online

Csoma is a village in Somogy county, Hungary.

The settlement is part of the Balatonboglár wine region.

== History ==
According to László Szita the settlement was completely Hungarian in the 18th century.
