= Attila Gelencsér =

Hungarian politician (born 1968)

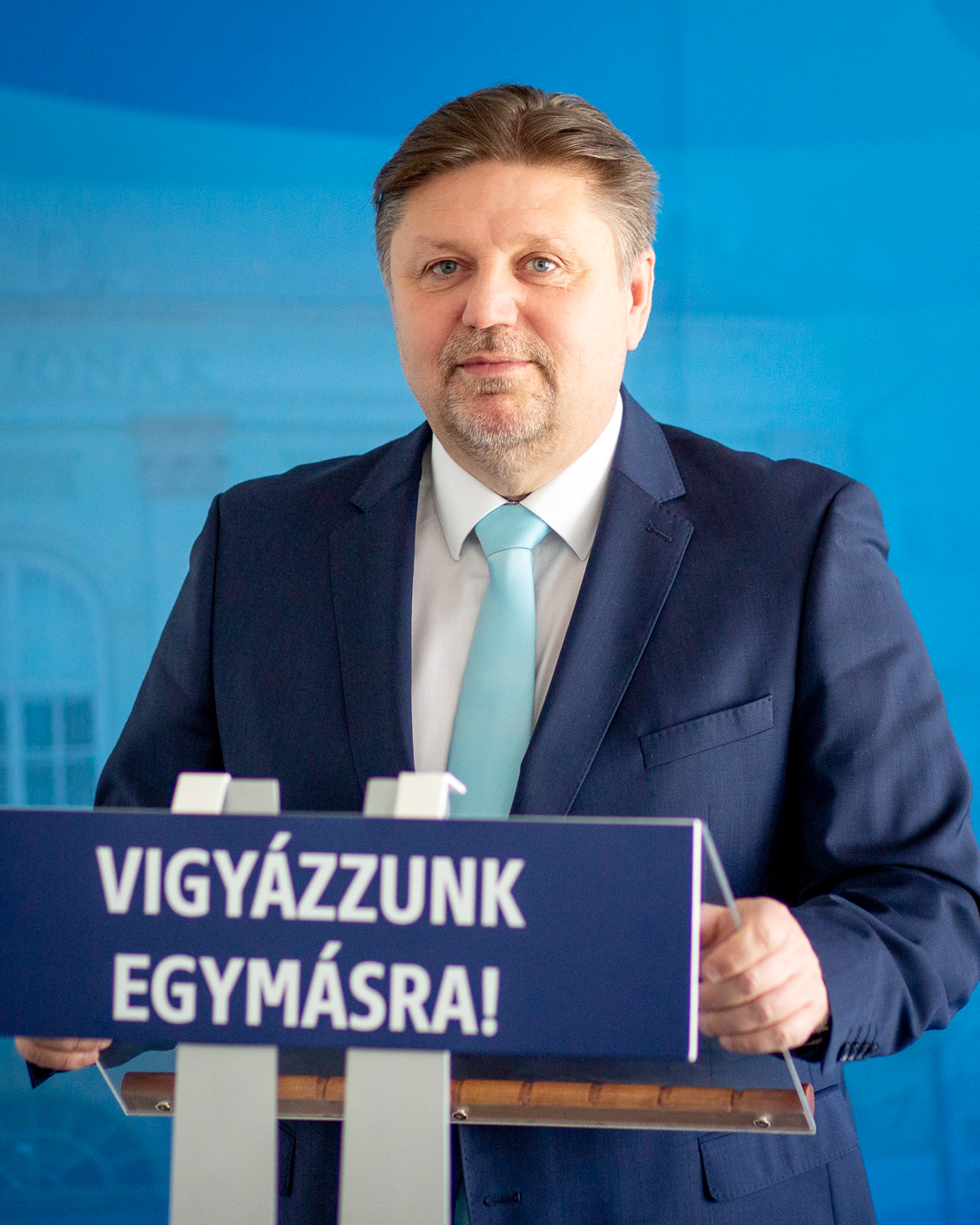

Member of the National Assembly
- In office 14 May 2010 – 9 May 2026

Personal details
- Born: 14 January 1968 (age 58) Kaposvár, Hungary
- Party: Fidesz (since 1992)
- Children: 3
- Profession: Politician

Attila Gelencsér (born January 14, 1968) is a Hungarian politician, member of the National Assembly (MP) for Kaposvár (Somogy County Constituency II then I) from 2010 to 2026.

He served as the President of the Somogy County General Assembly between 2006 and 2014.

== Personal life ==
He is married and has three children - two daughters and one son.
