= Somogy County 4th constituency =

- Constituency for the National Assembly
- Location of Somogy county 04 within Somogy county

- Location of Somogy county within Hungary
- County: Somogy County
- Population: 75,748 (2022)
- Major settlements: Siófok

Current constituency
- Created: 2011
- Party: Tisza Party
- Member: Ernő Csatári
- Elected: 2026

The Somogy County 4th parliamentary constituency is one of the 106 constituencies into which the territory of Hungary is divided by Act CCIII of 2011, and in which voters can elect one member of the National Assembly. The standard abbreviation of the constituency name is: Somogy 04. OEVK. The seat is Siófok.

== Area ==
The constituency includes the following settlements:

1. Ádánd
2. Andocs
3. Bábonymegyer
4. Balatonendréd
5. Balatonföldvár
6. Balatonőszöd
7. Balatonszabadi
8. Balatonszárszó
9. Balatonszemes
10. Balatonvilágos
11. Bálványos
12. Baté
13. Bedegkér
14. Bonnya
15. Büssü
16. Ecseny
17. Felsőmocsolád
18. Fiad
19. Fonó
20. Gadács
21. Gölle
22. Igal
23. Kánya
24. Kapoly
25. Kára
26. Karád
27. Kazsok
28. Kereki
29. Kisbárapáti
30. Kisgyalán
31. Kőröshegy
32. Kötcse
33. Lulla
34. Magyaratád
35. Mernye
36. Miklósi
37. Nágocs
38. Nagyberény
39. Nagycsepely
40. Nyim
41. Orci
42. Patalom
43. Pusztaszemes
44. Ráksi
45. Ságvár
46. Sérsekszőlős
47. Siófok
48. Siójut
49. Som
50. Somodor
51. Somogyacsa
52. Somogybabod
53. Somogydöröcske
54. Somogyegres
55. Somogymeggyes
56. Somogyszil
57. Szántód
58. Szentgáloskér
59. Szólád
60. Szorosad
61. Tab
62. Taszár
63. Teleki
64. Tengőd
65. Torvaj
66. Törökkoppány
67. Visz
68. Zala
69. Zamárdi
70. Zics
71. Zimány

== Members of parliament ==
Name	Party	Term	Election
Mihály Witzmann	Fidesz-KDNP	2014–2026	Results of the 2014 parliamentary election:
Mihály Witzmann	Fidesz-KDNP	2014–2026	Results of the 2018 parliamentary election:
Mihály Witzmann	Fidesz-KDNP	2014–2026	Results of the 2022 parliamentary election:
Ernő Csatári	Tisza Party	2026 – present	Results of the 2026 parliamentary election: 49.87%

== Demographics ==
Historical population
Year	Pop.	±%
2011	78,924	—
2022	75,748	−4.0%

The demographics of the constituency are as follows. The population of constituency No. 4 of Somogy County was 75,748 on October 1, 2022. The population of the constituency decreased by 3,176 between the 2011 and 2022 censuses. Based on the age composition, the majority of the population in the constituency is middle-aged with 27,885 people, while the least is children with 11,899 people. 80.9% of the population of the constituency has internet access

According to the highest level of completed education, those with a high school diploma are the most numerous, with 21,322 people, followed by skilled workers with 17,066 people.

According to economic activity, almost half of the population is employed, 34,433 people, the second most significant group is inactive earners, who are mainly pensioners, with 21,612 people.

The most significant ethnic group in the constituency is German with 1,585 people and Gypsy with 862 people. The proportion of foreign citizens without Hungarian citizenship is 2.7%.

According to religious composition, the largest religion of the residents of the constituency is Roman Catholic (23,511 people), and a significant community is the Calvinist (5,213 people). The number of those not belonging to a religious community is also significant (6,922 people), the second largest group in the constituency after the Roman Catholic religion.

== Sources ==
- ↑ Vjt.: "2011. évi CCIII. törvény az országgyűlési képviselők választásáról". Nemzeti Jogszabálytár. Magyar Közlöny Lap- és Könyvkiadó Kft.
- ↑ KSH: "Az országgyűlési egyéni választókerületek adatai". Népszámlálás 2011. Központi Statisztikai Hivatal.
