= Somogyegres =

Somogyegres Németegres (until 1931)
- Village
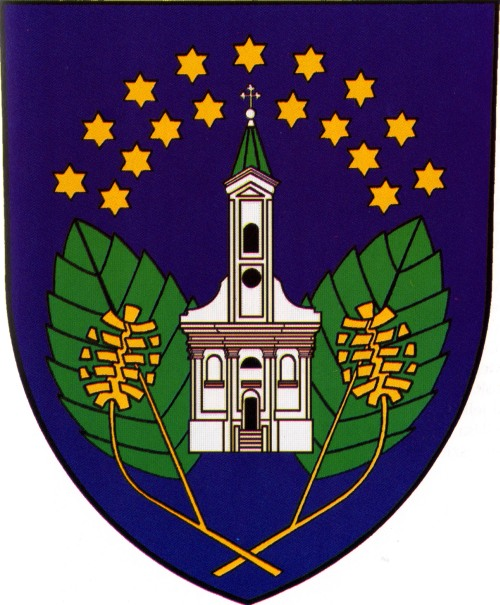
- Coat of arms

- Location of Somogy county in Hungary

- Location of Somogyegres
- Coordinates: 46.67779°N 18.02643°E
- Country: Hungary
- Region: Southern Transdanubia
- County: Somogy
- District: Tab
- RC Diocese: Kaposvár

Area
  - Total: 10.81 km^{2} (4.17 sq mi)

Population (2017)
  - Total: 163
  - Density: 15.1/km^{2} (39.1/sq mi)
- Demonym(s): egresi, somogyegresi
- Time zone: UTC+1 (CET)
  - Summer (DST): UTC+2 (CEST)
- Postal code: 8666
- Area code: (+36) 84
- NUTS 3 code: HU232
- MP: Mihály Witzmann (Fidesz)

Somogyegres (until 1931 as Németegres) is a village in Tab District, Somogy county, Hungary.

== Etymology ==
The name of the settlement does not derive from the word egres (English: gooseberry) but from the word éger / égeres (English: alder) because earlier it was surrounded by an alder forest.

== Coat of arms ==
The coat of arms of Somogyegres depicts the Roman Catholic church of the village in the middle, referring to the main symbol of the settlement and the role of religion in the life of its residents. Above that are 12 stars which symbolize the 12 founding families of Somogyegres. On the two sides of the church are two leaves and fruits of the alder tree.

== Geography ==
The village lies in Outer Somogy, surrounded by lakes and forests of beech, oak and hornbeam. The place is a well-known hunting ground with a rich wildlife. It is approachable on paved road only from Bedegkér but on dirt roads from Zics, Kapoly, Tab and Kánya as well.

== History ==
Somogyegres was first mentioned in 1237 as Egres in an official document in connection with the possession policies of Béla IV of Hungary. The certificate written in Zólyom (today Zvolen, Slovakia) confirms the gift of King Imre who "donated certain people living in Somogy county with their lands, their vineyards and all their possessions" to the Archbishopric of Esztergom.

In 1526, after the Battle of Mohács, the Turks destroyed the settlement. In the tax register of 1536 it is listed as Egrech. In the 1563 the tax register of the Ottoman Porte mentioned the village as Egrös which had 12 houses at that time, then 18 houses between 1573 and 1574. During the time of the Turkish occupation it was called Nagyegrös. István György Tóth historian tells about the letter of Mustafa, Beg of Koppány, for Ádám Batthyány, Chief Captain of Transdanubia, dated June 18, 1637, in which the Turkish chieftain complains that Hungarian nobles from the Balaton Uplands and Zala - the Keszthelyi, Devecseri, Zalavári etc. families - brutally excised the locals of Somogyegres. In the letter he asks the chief captain, who is also the owner of the village, not to allow these families to launch raids in the region.

During the 17th century the village depopulated. There are two possible reasons for that: either the Turks destroyed it or there was a great epidemic which killed the population. Some years after the Treaty of Karlowitz in 1713 Somogyegres was reborn. In 1715 there were already six households. Until 1724 it was exclusively inhabited by Hungarians. Then German settlers arrived in smaller numbers. The presence of the German culture can be proved by the fact that stone altars next to the main road were erected which was typical in German speaking territory at that time. Two of them still can be found in the village. Its landlord was the Batthyány family in 1773. In 1763 Lajos Batthyány, the Palatine of Hungary owned the village. Later it was the possession of Fülöp Batthyány, then Alfred Montenuovo.

Until 1931 the settlement was called Németegres (English: German Egres) which was changed by the request of the residents to Somogyegres.

Eight residents were deported to malenky robot in the Soviet Union in 1945. All of them survived and returned home in 1947.

== Main sights ==
- Roman Catholic church dedicated to the apostles James and Philip. It was built in Baroque style in 1781 and financed by József Batthyány. Its orgel was made by Rieger Orgelbau.
- Parish of the church was donated by Kálmán Diósi and Zsófia Finta in 1946
- Fire truck from 1939
