= Nágocs =

Nágocs Nagotsch (in German)
- Village
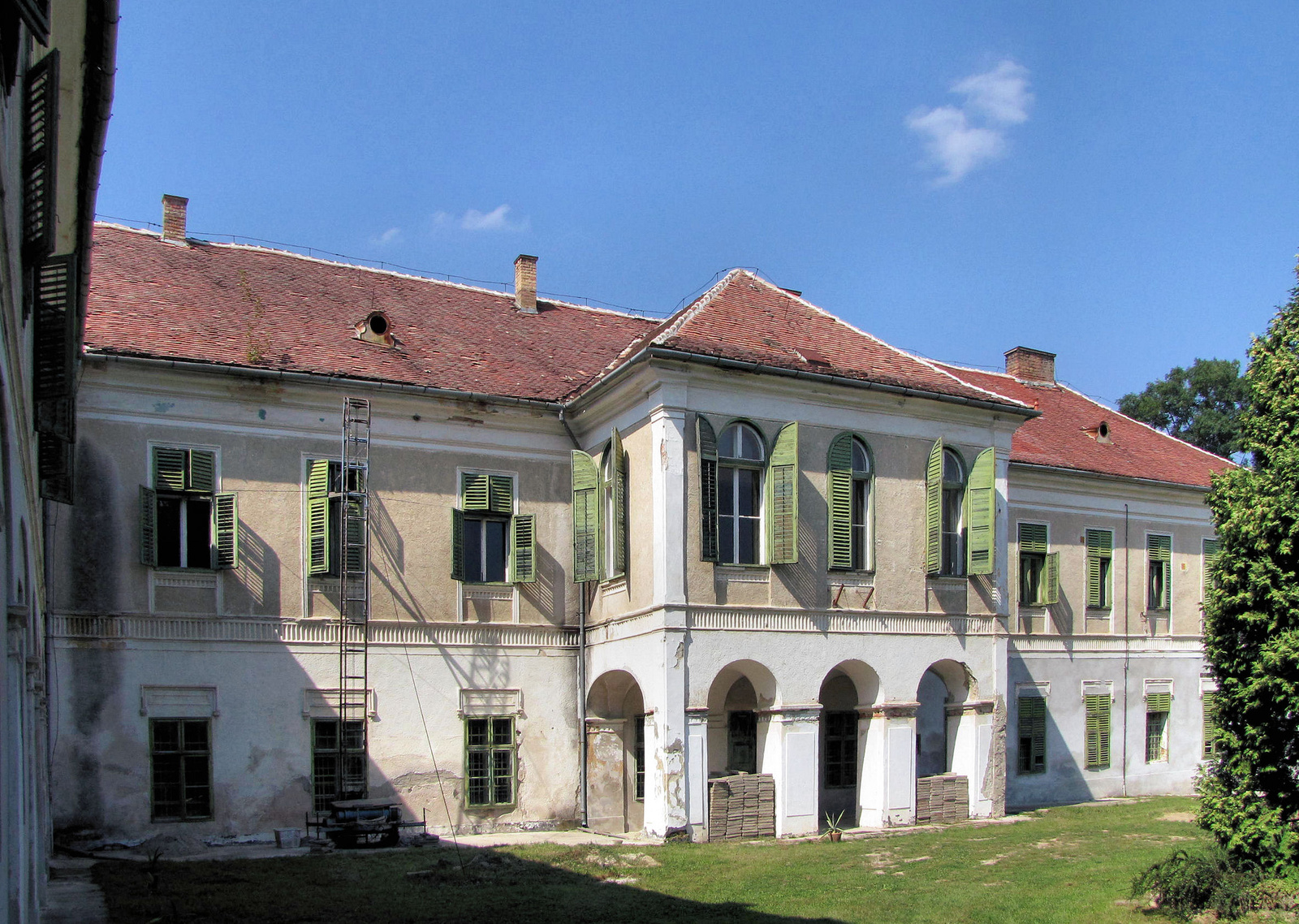
- Zichy Mansion in Nágocs

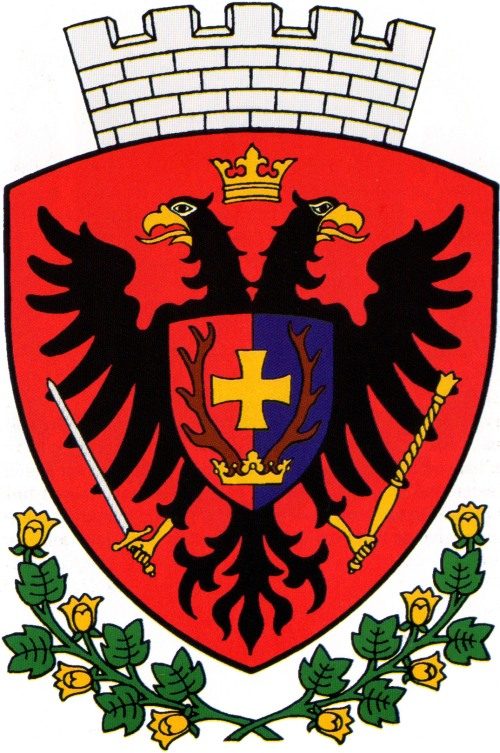
- Coat of arms

- Location of Somogy county in Hungary

- Location of Nágocs
- Coordinates: 46.66128°N 17.95922°E
- Country: Hungary
- Region: Southern Transdanubia
- County: Somogy
- District: Tab
- RC Diocese: Kaposvár
- Market town: 1788 (again in 1792)

Area
  - Total: 22.26 km^{2} (8.59 sq mi)
- Highest elevation: 245 m (804 ft)
- Lowest elevation: 153 m (502 ft)

Population (2017)
  - Total: 685
  - Density: 30.8/km^{2} (79.7/sq mi)
- Demonym: nágocsi
- Time zone: UTC+1 (CET)
  - Summer (DST): UTC+2 (CEST)
- Postal code: 8674
- Area code: (+36) 84
- NUTS 3 code: HU232
- MP: Mihály Witzmann (Fidesz)
- Website: Nágocs Online

Nágocs (German: Nagotsch) is a village in Somogy County, Hungary. Jutom-puszta, Csillag-puszta, Tomé-puszta and Kovászna are all parts of Nágocs.

== Geography ==
It lies in the middle of the Outer Somogy Hill Range, 25 km far from Lake Balaton and 35 km from Kaposvár. Its neighbors are Kapoly to the North, Andocs to the West, Somogyacsa to the South, Zics, Miklósi and Kára to the East. The village is situated in a valley between two hills where the Brook Nágocs originates.

== History ==
The territory of Nágocs was already inhabited in prehistoric times which is proofed by the archaeological finds from the Stone, Bronze and Iron Ages. There was a settlement in the 3rd millennium which could burnish and drill stones according to the finds.

During the 1st millennium Celts and Illyrians lived there. Their graves, weapons, tools and decorations were found in Nágocs during the last centuries.

Nágocs was first mentioned by its name in 1138 as villa Nagasu, then in 1264 as villa Nagach in official documents. Between 1208 and 1290 it was the possession of Óvári-Kéméndi branch of the Győr genus. The landowner was Osli ispán of the Osli genus who donated this settlement to the church of Csoma in 1230. It was under the suzerainty of Dáróvár in 1450, then in 1536 it came into the hands of the Dombai family. Between 1573 and 1574 according to the Ottoman Porte's tax register it had 30 houses, in 1580 32 houses. The Zichy family also claimed the village in the years 1598 and 1599.

In 1715 there were only five households. It was among those settlements that were not completely perished during the Turkish occupation and several of its Hungarian residents stayed there. In 1718 the first wave of Germans settled in the village. They were by name Sebastianis Fuliner, Joannes Wellingh, Joan Jacobus Pyenth, Josephus Hirspolt (Hirschpolth), Leonardus Quitner. Their second wave arrived in 1723. According to the list of residents of Nágocs the following came from German territory: Leonardus Quikner, Leonardus Jollmer, Josephus Herspold, Sabastion Peckner, Johann Triss, Valent Sishentancz, Henricus Becker, Johannes Adand, Joannes Adam Merk, Joannes Sondergeldt, Jakobus Faik (Feik), Michael Zeiger, Konradus Hepp(Heb), Job. Georg Sergar, Georg Frankerperger, Balthazar Horn, Johann Linthman (Lintamann), Michael Bolch. (The notary did not spell their names correctly.) They were either Swabians or Franconians (Svevi et Franconis), but all Roman Catholic.

Nágocs's Hungarian population existed later on among the German and also Hungarians settled there. In 1728 Mihály Balassa and Miklós Vörös were recorded as settlers. In the same year there were 18 Hungarian and 13 German households. The judge of the village was Jakob Faik (Feik) who replaced the deceased Jakob Rasterberg (Rasterpeg). The deputy judge was Jakob Quikner. There was also a wave of settlers in the 1740s. But several of them moved further after some years. None of the German families recorded in 1720s lived there in 1751. That could be explained by the fact that the newcomers got six years tax exemptions, so after six years they moved away. Georg Rausenberger, Adam Saller, Georg Lieppel, Balthasar Pulhmann, Michael Seifert, Johannes Klipper, Peter Schivs, Sebastian Faller, Cristophorus Hirspolt were the names of those who lived in Nágocs in 1751. In 1759 came the last wave of Germans in Nágocs. After that most settlers arrived to Nágocs from Tolna County and Baranya County. Among them were also some Lutherans. According to the 1794/1795 register there were 48 who had lands to plough and 11 cottars with own house and 45 without. There were 20 guilds - 13 German and 7 Hungarian. It became a market town first in 1788, then in 1792. The Zichy, Erdődy és Rubidó families had lands around Nágocs.

According to the 1849 census Nágocs had 1,128 residents of which 556 were Hungarians, 564 Germans. There were 1,120 Roman Catholics and 8 Jews.

In the 1910 census it had 1,142 residents, 1,004 Hungarians and 138 Germans. There were 834 Roman Catholics, 279 Calvinists, 13 Lutherans and 13 Jews.

=== Jutom-puszta ===
Jutom-puszta was first mentioned as Juton in 1397, then as Juthey in 1450 in official documents and was suzerainty of Dáróvár. Later in 1726 it was written as Gyutom and owned by Ádám Zichy.

=== Tomé-puszta ===
Tomé-puszta was first mentioned in 1726 in official documents. Ádám Zichy was its landlord.

=== Kovászna ===
Kovászna was first mentioned in 1583 in the tax register as the possession of András Perneszy.

== Main sights ==
- Zichy Mansion
- Roman Catholic church - built in 1757
- Turul statue
