= Kára, Hungary =

Kára
- Village
- Coat of arms

- Location of Somogy county in Hungary

- Location of Kára, Hungary
- Coordinates: 46.61722°N 18.01068°E
- Country: Hungary
- Region: Southern Transdanubia
- County: Somogy
- District: Tab
- RC Diocese: Kaposvár

Government
  - Mayor: Ferenc Hoffmann

Area
  - Total: 5.37 km^{2} (2.07 sq mi)

Population (2017)
  - Total: 35
  - Density: 6.5/km^{2} (17/sq mi)
- Demonym: kárai
- Time zone: UTC+1 (CET)
  - Summer (DST): UTC+2 (CEST)
- Postal code: 7285
- Area code: (+36) 84
- NUTS 3 code: HU232
- MP: Mihály Witzmann (Fidesz)
- Website: Kára Online

Kára is a village in Somogy county, Hungary.

== Etymology ==
Its name derives from the Turkish person name, Kara (Hungarian: fekete, English: black). He could be the first owner of the settlement. The same applies to Karád.

== Geography ==
It lies south of Tab, between Miklósi and Szorosad.

== History ==
It was first mentioned in 1138 in the documents of Dömös Chapter as Villa Kara.

From 1229 it was a possession of the Chapter of Székesfehérvár, but in 1294 Somogyvár still had lands there. Its name appears in the papal tithe registration between 1332 and 1337. Pannonhalma Abbey had peasants there in 1336 and it was its own possession in 1466. In 1489 it was listed as the land of István Szerdahelyi. In 1485 it was a royal estate under the name Kiskara. It was also mentioned in 1536 in the tax register of Pannonhalma Abbey as the possession of Pál Dereskei and András Ispán. During the Turkish occupation the village lost its population. Kára was still uninhabited in 1757. It came in the hands of the Zichy family who settled Roman Catholic Germans there who gained tax benefits. In 1848 the settlement had 245 residents, half of them were German-speaking. In 1858 at the time of serfdom abolishing there were more than 50 lands.

In 1910 out of its 292 residents 139 were Hungarian and 153 German. According to their religious affiliation there were 271 Roman Catholic, 12 Lutheran and 5 Jews.

In 1950 Kára formed with Szorosad a common council. Later it became part of Törökkoppány. In 1989 it regained its independence.

== Notable residents ==
- László Karai (15th century – 1485? , 1488? ), Hungarian provost
