= Norbert Pap =

Hungarian geographer and historian

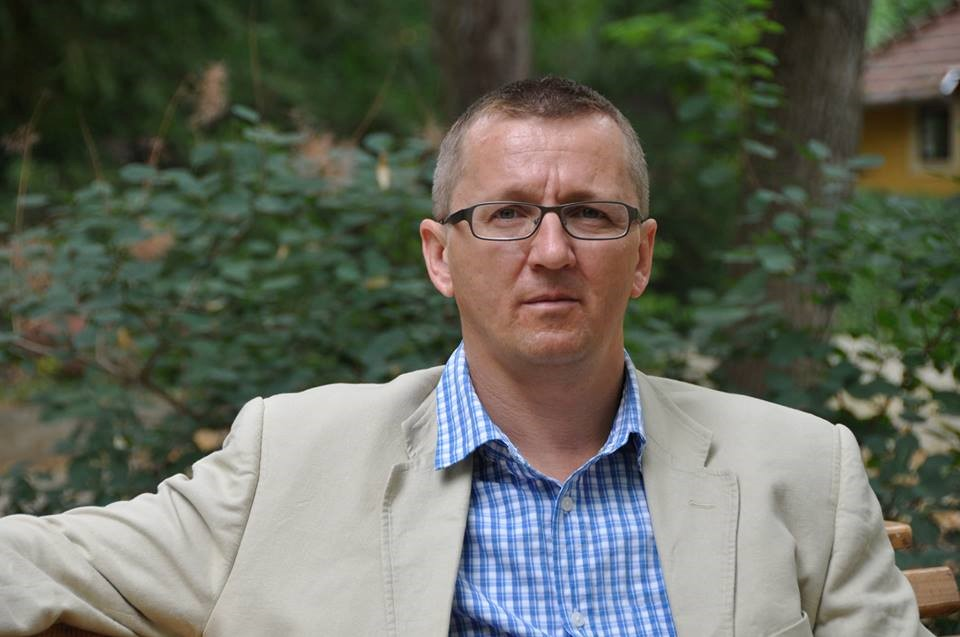
- Born: 3 June 1969 (age 57); Tab, Hungary
- Occupations: Historian-geographer, associate professor

Norbert Pap (born 3 June 1969, in Tab, Hungary) is a Hungarian geographer–historian, founder of the Balkan Research Group, as well as leader of the Zrinski-Suleiman Research Group.

== Early life ==
He graduated from Sándor Petőfi High School of Sárbogárd, and also attended a geologic technical school. Pap studied geography and later history at the Janus Pannonius University in Pécs. He did special studies during the university: urbanistic, archaeological studies and tourism. He gained a scholarship and spent a semester in Firenze at the Political Science Faculty of Universitá degli Studi di Firenze, „Cesare Alfieri”. After graduating from university he did postgraduate studies in politology at the University of Pécs at the Faculty of Law.

== Career ==
Pap started his research work in 1995 at the Doctoral School on Earth Sciences at the University of Pécs graduating there four years later with highest honor: summa cum laude. He' been working at the University of Pécs at the Institute of Geography since 1998. In 1999 the rector of the university invited him to be the managing director of the East-Mediterranean and Balkan Studies Center, which he still fills in. Pap is an associate professor since 2004 and the leader of the Political Geography Department.

Since 2008, one of his research topics is the spread and the situation of Islam in Central and Eastern Europe and in Hungary. Pap has been working in Szigetvár since 2010, he's leading the researches related to the death and burial of Suleiman sultan. Since 2015 he's been leading historical and geographical investigations in relation with the role of Miklós Zrinski and Suleiman the Magnificent in Szigetvár.

== Academic work ==
Pap has started his tutorial and research work in the field of political geography, regional and municipal development. He has 221 publications including 8 books. Pap is a member of the Hungarian Geography Society, president of one of the Committees of the Hungarian Academy of Sciences, is a member of the International Geographic Union Commission on Mediterranean Basin.

== Awards, recognition ==
He gained a Soros, a Békésy and a Bolyai scholarship. The Hungarian Academy of Sciences awarded him as a Young Researcher for his geopolitical essay. He also received from the HAS a Szádeczky-Kardoss Elemér award for his publication activity on political geography. The Hungarian Geographical Society acknowledged his research, organization, and academic work with a Pro Geographia award as well. In 2013 he received the city's scientific award from Pécs, as well as in 2016 the County of Baranya's General Assembly acknowledged his work with a Cultural Award.

== Major publications ==
- Pap, N. 2013: Hungary, the Balkans and the Mediterranean. Publikon Publishers, Pécs, 212 p.
- Pap, N. 2010: Hungary in the area of the Balkans and the Mediterranean. Publikon Publishers, Pécs, 320 p.
- Pap, N. 2007: L'Ungheria ed il Mediterraneo. Il carattere geografico dei rapporti fra l'Ungheria e gli stati del Europa meridionale. Imedias Editore, 206 p.
- Pap, N. – Kitanics, M. – Gyenizse, P. – Hancz, E. – Bognár, Z. – Tóth, T. – Hámori, Z. 2015: Finding the tomb of Suleiman the Magnificent in Szigetvár, Hungary: historical, geophysical and archeological investigations. - Die Erde, 146:(4) pp. 289–303.
- Pap, N. – Kitanics, M. 2015: The research for Suleiman the Magnificent's tomb in Szigetvar (1903–2015). – Mediterrán és Balkán Fórum, 9:(2) pp. 2–19.
- Pap, N. – Reményi, P. – M. Császár, Zs. – Végh, A. 2014: Islam and the Hungarians - MITTEILUNGEN DER OSTERREICHISCHEN GEOGRAPHISCHEN GESELLSCHAFT 156: pp. 191–220.
- Pap, N. - Kitanics, M. 2014: Hungary and the Balkans. – MEGATREND REVIEW / MEGATREND REVIJA 11:(4) pp. 219–240.
- Pap, N. 2014: The beginning of the Suleiman-research, the main results in 2013. / Sigetvar’da Kanuni Sultan Süleyman Hakkında Yapılan Arastırmaların Ana Noktaları ve 2013 Yılı Sonuçları. In: Pap, N. (szerk./ed.): The remembrance of Suleiman in Szigetvar / Kanuni Sultan Süleyman’ın Sigetvar’daki hatırası. – Mediterrán és Balkán Fórum, VIII. Volume, Special edition, University of Pécs, TTK FI, Pécs, pp. 23–36.
- Pap N. 2013: The sunnite Muslim community in Pécs – Minority Research, 22:(2) pp. 120–133.
- Pap, N. – Kitanics, M. 2012: The political challenges of the Hungarian Balkan. Foreign Affairs Review 11th Volume, 4. pp. 150–165.
- Pap, N. – Kitanics, M. 2012: La apuesta de Montenegro por la integracion europea. - CUADERNOS CONSTITUCIONALES DE LA CÁTEDRA FADRIQUE FURIÓ CERIOL. 38: pp. 21–32. (2012)
- Pap, N. – Kitanics, M. 2012: Las relaciones geopolíticas de las áreas albanesas. – Historia Actual Online, 10:(27) pp. 103–116.
- Pap, N. – Végh, A. – Reményi, P. 2012: Corridors in the Western Balkans and the Hungarian exit to the sea. – Revista Romana de Geografie Politica, Volume 14, Issue 2, pp. 176–188.
- Pap, N. – Reményi, P. 2007: Security issues of West-Balkan. – Regio, 2007 English Edition, pp. 27–58.
- Pap, N. 2003: Political geography of Southern Europe. - GEOGRAFSKI VESTNIK 75:(2) pp. 101–109.
- Pap, N. 1999: Corridors in Middle Europe. Geographical Publications CXXIII./XLVII./ 3–4. pp. 180–190.
- Pap, N. – Végh, A. 2006: Agriculture. In: Kocsis, K. ed.: South Eastern-Europe in maps. GRI - HAS, pp. 97–107.
- Hajdú, Z. – Pap, N. – Pirisi, G. 2005: Handelszentren und Siedlungsstruktur im Komitat Tolna. In: Walter Zsilincsar Hsg., Neue Einzelhandelsstrukturen am Rande von Kleinstadten, Graz, pp. 99–108.
- Pap, N. 2007: The Hungarian, Regional Development System. In: Pap, N. ed.: Tolna – a rural area in Central –Europe. Local and regional development in Tolna County, Hungary. Lomart Publisher, Pécs, pp. 9–24.
- Pap, N. – Végh, A. 2008: Minderheit-Mehrheit-Mutternation-Verhältnisse im Westbalkan - Raum. In: Kupa, L./ Hammer, E. Hrsg.: Ethno-Kulturelle Begegnungen in Mittel- und Osteuropa. Verlag Dr. Kovac, Hamburg, pp. 199–214.
- Pap, N. 2009: The southern dimension in Hungarian foreign policy thinking. In: The Hungarian Cultural Diversity Research Group (ed.), Joint Research with the University of Pécs for the Preservation and Development of Cultural Diversity, Graduate School of Humanities and Social Sciences, Nagoya City University, Nagoya, Japan, 2009.
- Hajdú, Z. – Pap, N. 2005: Potential possibilities of cross-border cooperations across the Hungarian-Croatian border after Hungary's accession to the European Union. - Region and Regionalism, The Role of borderlands in United Europe.No. 7 vol. 1., pp. 117–124.
- Pap, N. – Tóth, J. – Csapó, T. 2006: Some thoughts on the relation system between the university and the society. – Lehrstuhl Wirtschaftsgeographie und Regionalplanung, Baureuth, H. 243., pp. 1–9.
- Pap, N. – Végh, A. 2006: The institutional system and working experiences of Hungarian spatial development. - Interdisciplinary Management Research II. JJ. Strossmayer University of Osijek, Osijek pp. 47–71.
- Pap, N. 2006: Agricultural impact on the environment in the Balcan Peninsula. – G. J. HALASI-KUN ed.: - Pollution and water Resources. Vol. XXXVI. Columbia University, New York, pp. 256–264.
- Pap, N. 2008: Pécs - a gateway city? - Acta Beregsiensis VIII. évf. 2. kötet pp. 223–238.
- Pap, N. – Yamamoto, A. 2009: The Tourism Politics and European Capital of Culture in 2010 Pécs - The Annual Report of Institute for Studies in Humanities and Cultures, Nagoya City University, Nagoya, Japan, 2009, pp. 37–42.
- Pap, N. 2003: Geographic Aspects of Regional Development Policy. – Development and Finance 2003/3, pp. 81–87.
- Pap, N. 2007: The role of Transdanubia in forming relations between relations in the Balkans and Italy. – Limes 2007/3. pp. 99–113.
- Pap, N. 2007: Geographical dimensions of the Hungarian–Italian relations. – Geographical Report, LV. Volume, 3–4. pp. 303–332.
