= Ernő Csatári =

Hungarian politician

Member of the National Assembly
- Incumbent
- Assumed office 9 May 2026
- Preceded by: Mihály Witzmann
- Constituency: Somogy 4th

Personal details
- Party: Tisza

Ernő Csatári is a Hungarian politician who was elected member of the National Assembly in 2026 representing the Somogy County 4th constituency. He previously worked as a hotel manager.
