= Tab District =

Coordinates: 46.7312213790873°N 18.033131984042846°E

Tab District Tabi járás
- Districts of Hungary
- Coat of arms

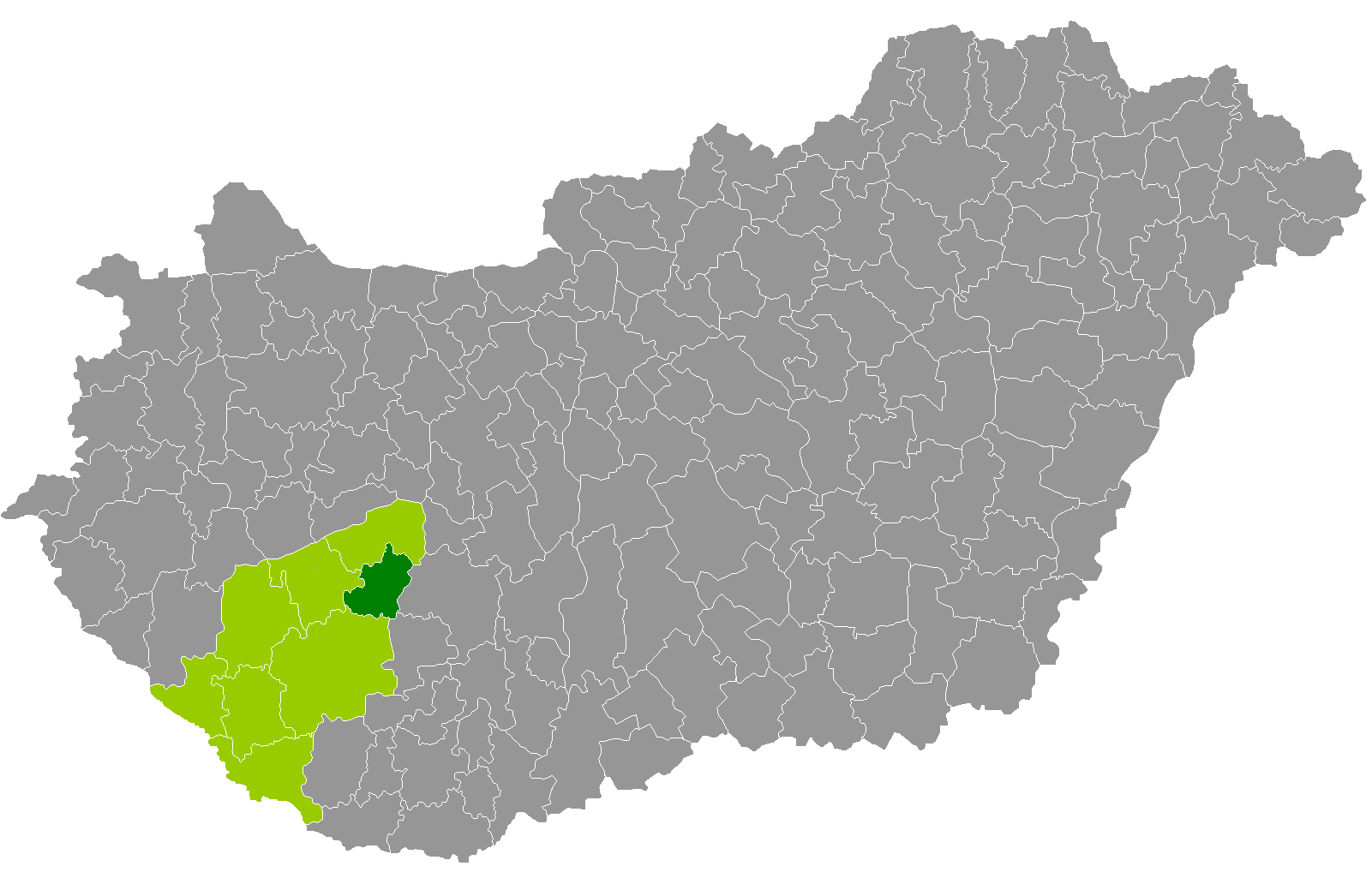
- Tab District within Hungary and Somogy County.
- Country: Hungary
- Region: Southern Transdanubia
- County: Somogy
- District seat: Tab

Area
  - Total: 427.24 km^{2} (164.96 sq mi)
  - Rank: 8th in Somogy

Population (2011 census)
  - Total: 12,797
  - Rank: 8th in Somogy
  - Density: 30/km^{2} (78/sq mi)

Tab (Hungarian: Tabi járás) is a district in north-eastern part of Somogy County, in Hungary. Tab is also the name of the town where the district seat is found. The district is located in the Southern Transdanubia Statistical Region.

== Geography ==
Tab District borders with Siófok District to the north, Tamási District (Tolna County) to the east, Dombóvár District (Tolna County) and Kaposvár District to the south, Fonyód District to the west. The number of the inhabited places in Tab District is 24.

== Municipalities ==
The district has 1 town and 23 villages. (ordered by population, as of 1 January 2013)

- Andocs (1,110)
- Bábonymegyer (816)
- Bedegkér (430)
- Bonnya (251)
- Fiad (138)
- Kapoly (670)
- Kánya (422)
- Kára (47)
- Kisbárapáti (418)
- Lulla (175)
- Miklósi (220)
- Nágocs (656)
- Sérsekszőlős (154)
- Somogyacsa (174)
- Somogydöröcske (132)
- Somogyegres (214)
- Somogymeggyes (497)
- Szorosad (106)
- **Tab** (4,430) – district seat
- Tengőd (447)
- Torvaj (245)
- Törökkoppány (428)
- Zala (245)
- Zics (361)

The bolded municipality is city.

== See also ==
- List of cities and towns in Hungary
