= Somogydöröcske =

- Village
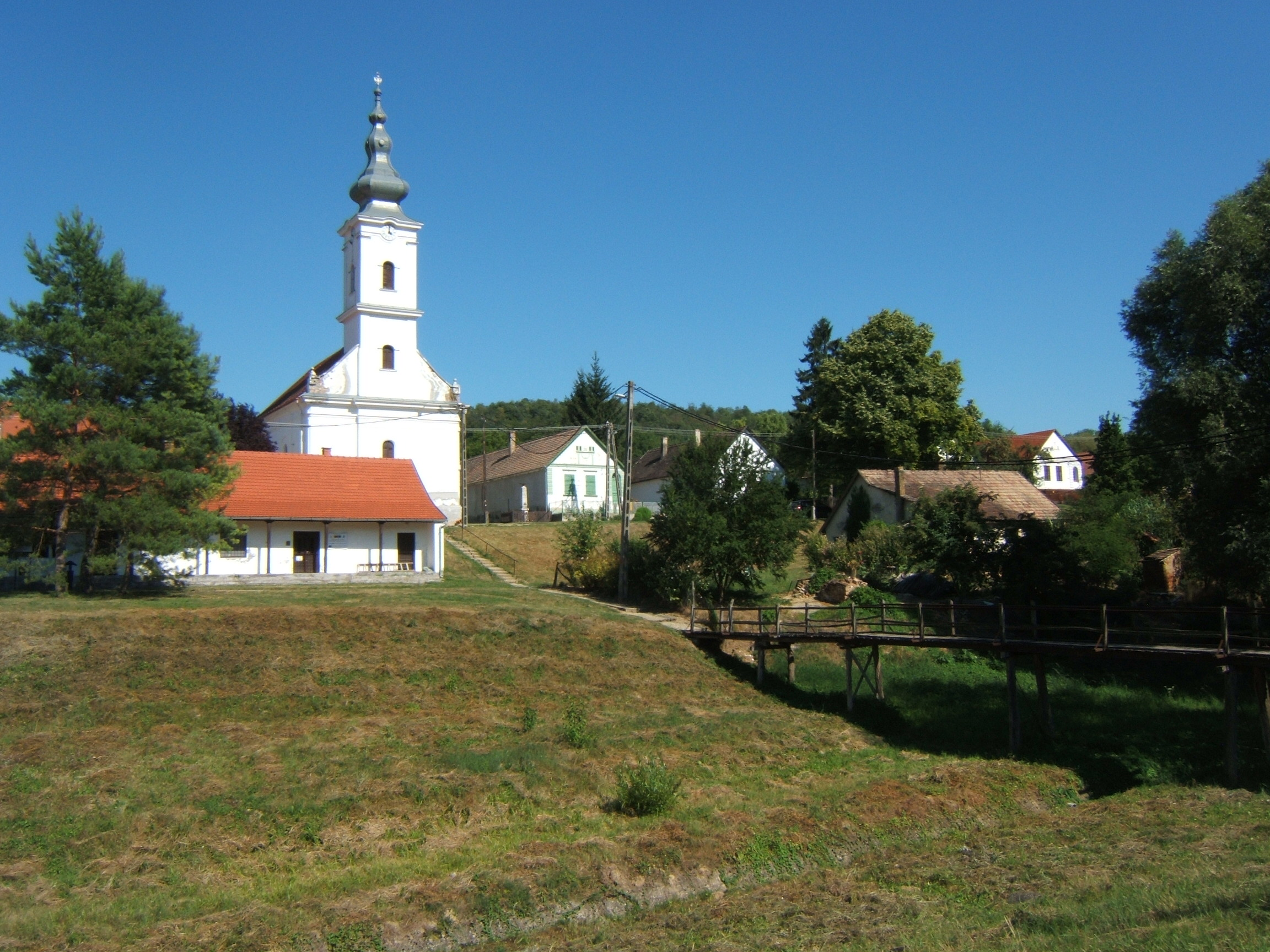
- Centre of Somogydöröcske

- Coat of arms

- Location of Somogy county in Hungary

- Location of Somogydöröcske
- Coordinates: 46.58727°N 18.00565°E
- Country: Hungary
- Region: Southern Transdanubia
- County: Somogy
- District: Tab
- RC Diocese: Kaposvár

Area
  - Total: 10.83 km^{2} (4.18 sq mi)

Population (2017)
  - Total: 133
  - Density: 12.3/km^{2} (31.8/sq mi)
- Demonym(s): döröcskei, somogydöröcskei
- Time zone: UTC+1 (CET)
  - Summer (DST): UTC+2 (CEST)
- Postal code: 7284
- Area code: (+36) 84
- NUTS 3 code: HU232
- MP: Mihály Witzmann (Fidesz)

Somogydöröcske is a village in Somogy county, Hungary.

== Geography ==
It lies southwest of Tamási, along the Brook Koppány. It is south of the main road running between Somogyacsa and Törökkoppány.

== History ==
Somogydöröcske or Döröcske belonged to Tolna County in the Middle Ages. It was first mentioned in 1138 as villa Diarugsa as a possession of the Dömös Chapter. Its name was written in 1267 as Derekche, between 1424 and 1436 as Derecske. In the 13th century the village belonged to the Döröcske clan, but also the Nádor of Hungary, Majs had lands there between 1270 and 1272. The Pauline Fathers had a monastery there in the Middle Ages, its memory is preserved by the hill called Klastromhegy (English: Monastery Mountain). In 1660 it was owned by Miklós Zankó.

In the tax registration of 1703 it was an uninhabited territory of Miklós Zankó and Boldizsár Zankó. In 1726 one half of the settlement belonged to the Harrach family and the other half to János Esterházy. In 1733, the village was owned by the Hunyadi family who settled Lutheran Germans there in the 18th century. In 1876, there was a huge landslide which damaged the church and the local school building.

In 1910, the population of the settlement was 842 people of which 796 were German and 46 Hungarian. According to their religious affiliation, 789 were Lutheran, 41 Roman Catholic and 3 Calvinist.

== Main sights ==
- Lutheran Church (built in 1836)
- Monument of the First and the Second World War
