= Somogymeggyes =

- Village
- Coat of arms

- Location of Somogy county in Hungary

- Location of Somogymeggyes
- Coordinates: 46.71104°N 17.91090°E
- Country: Hungary
- Region: Southern Transdanubia
- County: Somogy
- District: Tab
- RC Diocese: Kaposvár

Area
  - Total: 15.65 km^{2} (6.04 sq mi)

Population (2017)
  - Total: 477
  - Density: 30.5/km^{2} (78.9/sq mi)
- Demonym(s): meggyesi, somogymeggyesi
- Time zone: UTC+1 (CET)
  - Summer (DST): UTC+2 (CEST)
- Postal code: 8673
- Area code: (+36) 84
- NUTS 3 code: HU232
- MP: Mihály Witzmann (Fidesz)
- Website: Somogymeggyes Online

Somogymeggyes is a village in Somogy county, Hungary.
