= Kisbárapáti =

- Village
- Coat of arms

- Location of Somogy county in Hungary

- Location of Kisbárapáti
- Coordinates: 46.60584°N 17.86656°E
- Country: Hungary
- Region: Southern Transdanubia
- County: Somogy
- District: Tab
- RC Diocese: Kaposvár

Area
  - Total: 28.71 km^{2} (11.08 sq mi)

Population (2017)
  - Total: 348
  - Density: 12.1/km^{2} (31.4/sq mi)
- Demonym: kisbárapáti
- Time zone: UTC+1 (CET)
  - Summer (DST): UTC+2 (CEST)
- Postal code: 7282
- Area code: (+36) 84
- NUTS 3 code: HU232
- MP: Mihály Witzmann (Fidesz)
- Website: Kisbárapáti Online

Kisbárapáti is a village in Somogy county, Hungary.
