= Fiad =

- Village
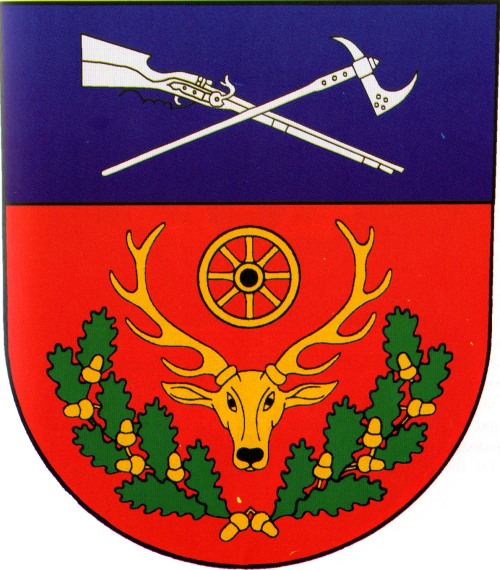
- Coat of arms

- Location of Somogy county in Hungary

- Location of Fiad
- Coordinates: 46.63211°N 17.83648°E
- Country: Hungary
- Region: Southern Transdanubia
- County: Somogy
- District: Tab
- RC Diocese: Kaposvár

Area
  - Total: 14.91 km^{2} (5.76 sq mi)

Population (2017)
  - Total: 115
  - Density: 7.71/km^{2} (20.0/sq mi)
- Demonym: fiadi
- Time zone: UTC+1 (CET)
  - Summer (DST): UTC+2 (CEST)
- Postal code: 7282
- Area code: (+36) 84
- NUTS 3 code: HU232
- MP: Mihály Witzmann (Fidesz)

Fiad is a village in Somogy county, Hungary.
