= Torvaj =

- Village
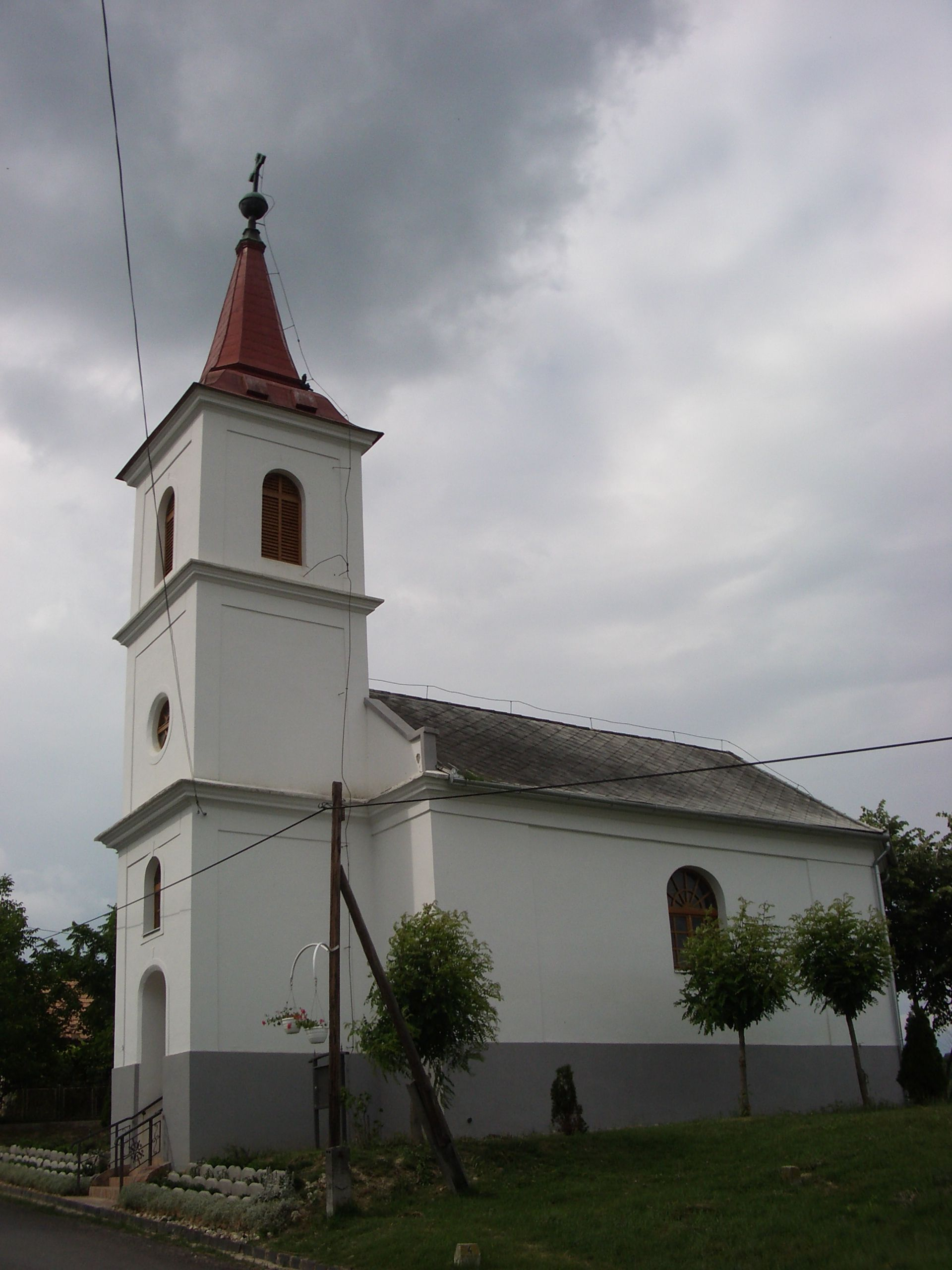
- Lutheran Church of Torvaj

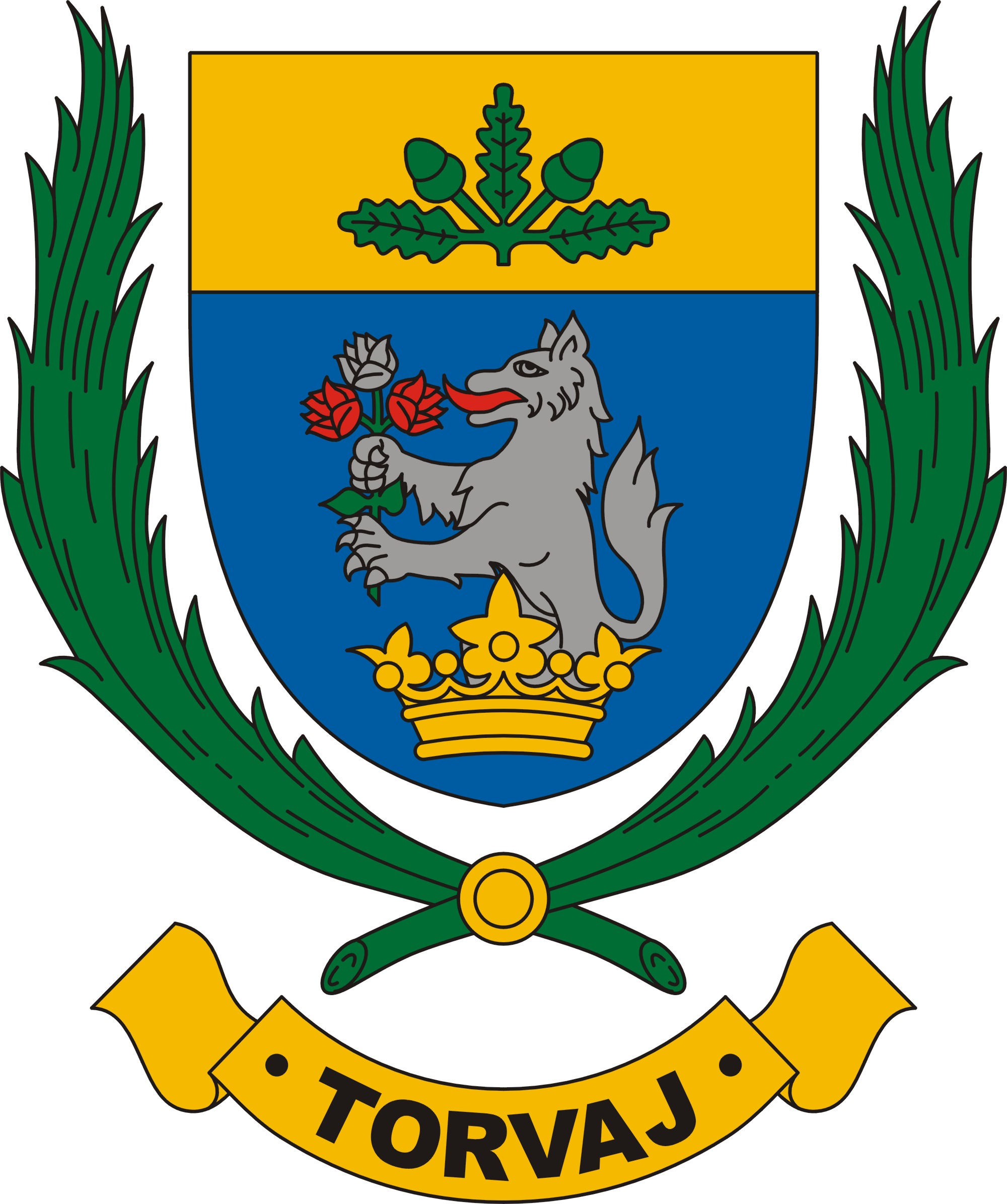
- Coat of arms

- Location of Somogy county in Hungary

- Location of Torvaj
- Coordinates: 46.77009°N 18.04460°E
- Country: Hungary
- Region: Southern Transdanubia
- County: Somogy
- District: Tab
- RC Diocese: Kaposvár

Area
  - Total: 11.42 km^{2} (4.41 sq mi)

Population (2017)
  - Total: 244
  - Density: 21.4/km^{2} (55.3/sq mi)
- Demonym: torvaji
- Time zone: UTC+1 (CET)
  - Summer (DST): UTC+2 (CEST)
- Postal code: 8660
- Area code: (+36) 84
- NUTS 3 code: HU232
- MP: Mihály Witzmann (Fidesz)

Torvaj is a village in Somogy county, Hungary.
