= Tengőd =

- Village
- Coat of arms

- Location of Somogy county in Hungary

- Location of Tengőd
- Coordinates: 46.70°N 18.04°E
- Country: Hungary
- Region: Southern Transdanubia
- County: Somogy
- District: Tab
- RC Diocese: Pécs

Area
  - Total: 30.21 km^{2} (11.66 sq mi)

Population (2017)
  - Total: 404
  - Density: 13.4/km^{2} (34.6/sq mi)
- Demonym: tengődi
- Time zone: UTC+1 (CET)
  - Summer (DST): UTC+2 (CEST)
- Postal code: 8668
- Area code: (+36) 84
- NUTS 3 code: HU232
- MP: Mihály Witzmann (Fidesz)

Tengőd is a village in Somogy county, Hungary.
