= Szorosad =

- Village
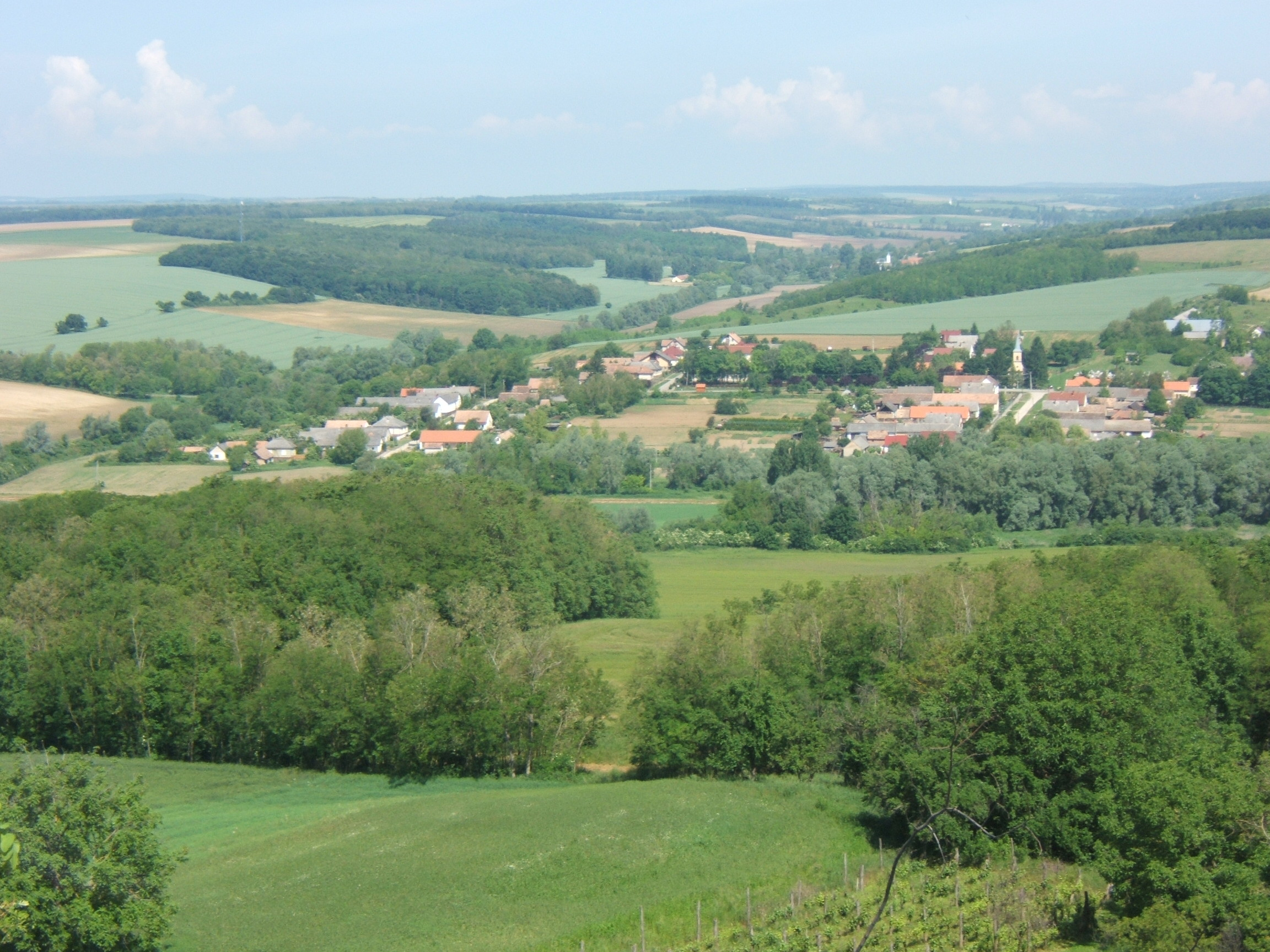
- View of Szorosad from the vineyard hill

- Coat of arms

- Location of Somogy county in Hungary

- Location of Szorosad
- Coordinates: 46.60295°N 18.02412°E
- Country: Hungary
- Region: Southern Transdanubia
- County: Somogy
- District: Tab
- RC Diocese: Kaposvár

Area
  - Total: 6.48 km^{2} (2.50 sq mi)

Population (2017)
  - Total: 94
  - Density: 15/km^{2} (38/sq mi)
- Demonym: szorosadi
- Time zone: UTC+1 (CET)
  - Summer (DST): UTC+2 (CEST)
- Postal code: 7285
- Area code: (+36) 84
- NUTS 3 code: HU232
- MP: Mihály Witzmann (Fidesz)
- Website: Szorosad Online

Szorosad is a village in Somogy county, Hungary.

== Geography ==
It lies between Siófok and Dombóvár, in the Somogy-Tolna Hill Range, on the northern side of the valley of the River Koppány. The nearest towns are Tamási and Tab.

== History ==
Szorosad had less than 6 houses in 1687 after the end of the Turkish occupation. During the 18th century Roman Catholic German settlers moved there for the invitation of the Diocese of Veszprém. The village became German-speaking. There were already 17 households in 1794. During the Napoleonic Wars Szorosad became well known for its vine. In the census of 1849 395 German residents lived there.

In 1947 according to the Czechoslovak–Hungarian population exchange 22 Hungarian families from Upper Hungary arrived in the village.
