= Bábonymegyer =

Bábonymegyer Nagybábony and Koppánymegyer (until 1927)
- Village
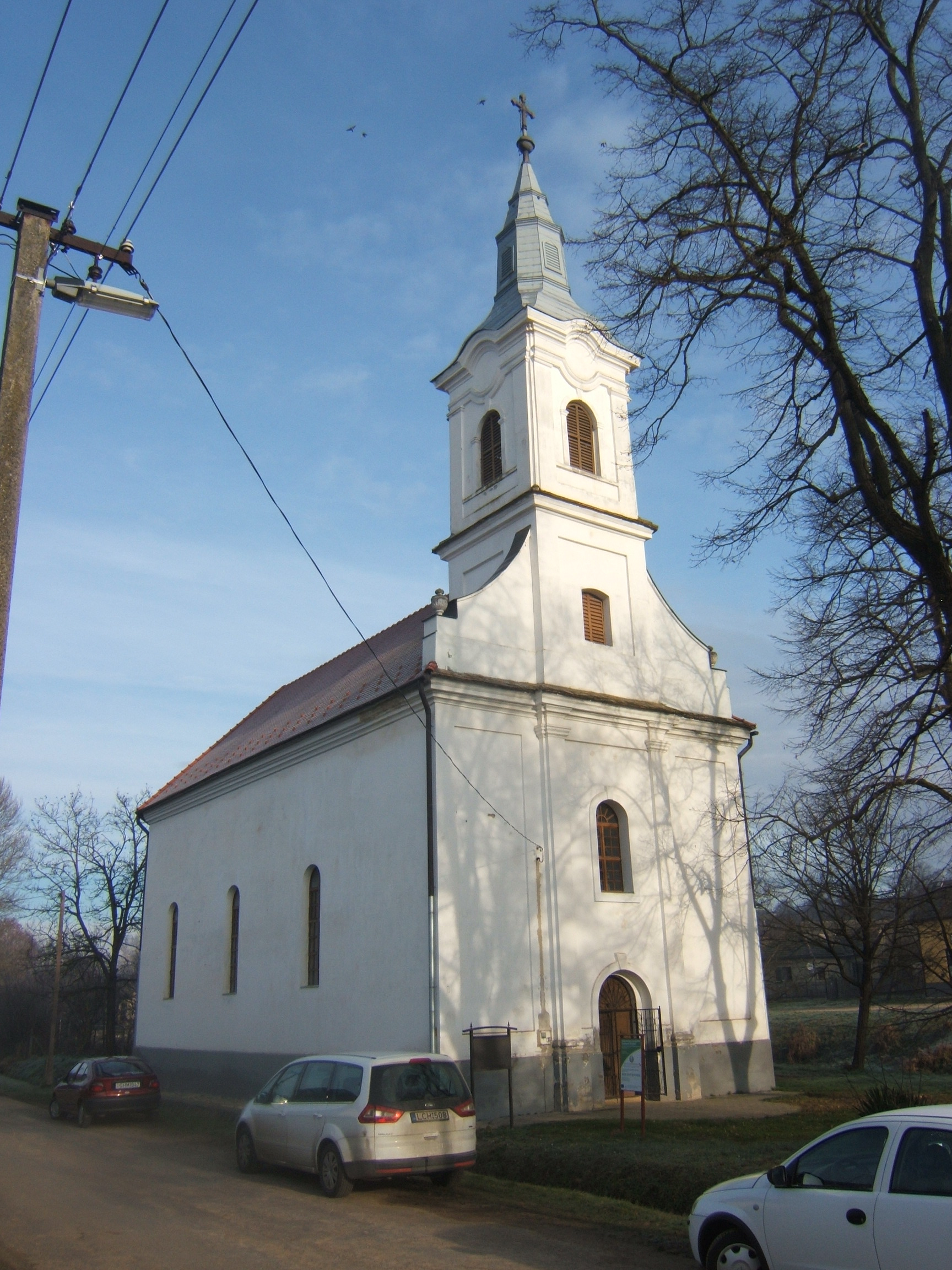
- The Roman Catholic Church of Bábonymegyer

- Coat of arms

- Location of Somogy county in Hungary

- Location of Bábonymegyer
- Coordinates: 46.75485°N 18.11061°E
- Country: Hungary
- Region: Southern Transdanubia
- County: Somogy
- District: Tab
- RC Diocese: Kaposvár

Area
  - Total: 21.93 km^{2} (8.47 sq mi)

Population (2017)
  - Total: 796
  - Density: 36.3/km^{2} (94.0/sq mi)
- Demonym(s): megyeri, bábonymegyeri
- Time zone: UTC+1 (CET)
  - Summer (DST): UTC+2 (CEST)
- Postal code: 8658
- Area code: (+36) 84
- NUTS 3 code: HU232
- MP: Mihály Witzmann (Fidesz)
- Website: Bábonymegyer Online

Bábonymegyer is a village in Somogy County, Hungary. Until 1927 it was two separate villages, Nagybábony and Koppánymegyer.

== History ==
Megyer was first mentioned in 1193, Bábon in 1259 in official documents. Its evangelical church was built in 1832 and its altar picture was painted by Gyula Rudnay who also lived in the village. The Reformed church was built in 1768 and its ceiling painting was also made by Gyula Rudnay. According to local legends the Hungarian betyár, Pista Patkó died here. A headboard keeps his memory in the village.

== Main sights ==
- Reformed church - built in 1832
- Evangelical church - built in 1768
- Monument of the First World War

== Notable residents ==
- Gyula Rudnay (1878 – 1957), Hungarian painter, graphic, professor
- Pista Patkó (? - 1862), Hungarian betyár
