= Kapoly =

- Village
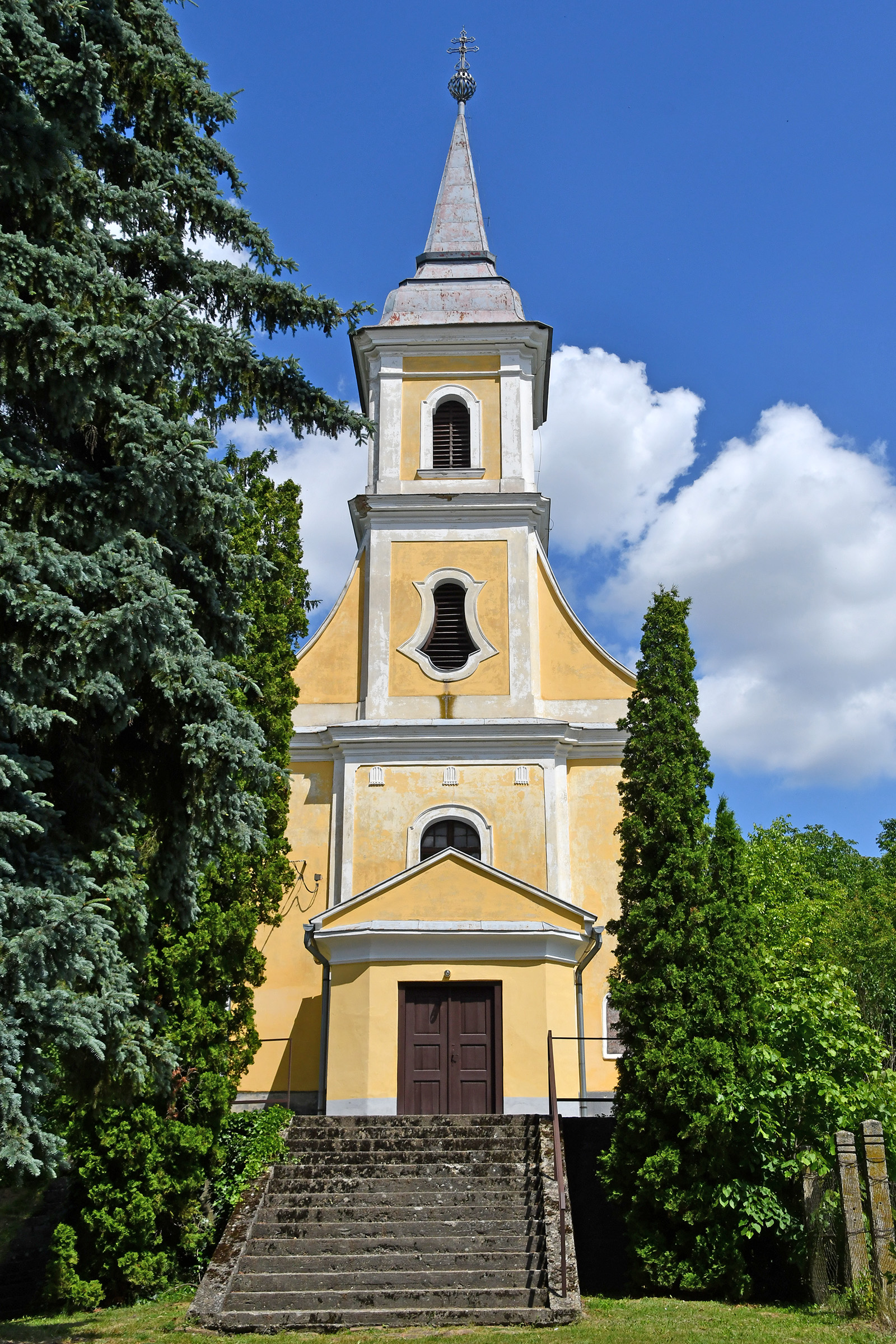
- Saint Michael Roman Catholic church in Kapoly

- Coat of arms

- Location of Somogy county in Hungary

- Location of Kapoly
- Coordinates: 46.72601°N 17.97279°E
- Country: Hungary
- Region: Southern Transdanubia
- County: Somogy
- District: Tab
- RC Diocese: Kaposvár

Area
  - Total: 22.37 km^{2} (8.64 sq mi)

Population (2017)
  - Total: 653
  - Density: 29.2/km^{2} (75.6/sq mi)
- Demonym: kapolyi
- Time zone: UTC+1 (CET)
  - Summer (DST): UTC+2 (CEST)
- Postal code: 8671
- Area code: (+36) 84
- Patron Saint: Michael Archangel
- NUTS 3 code: HU232
- MP: Mihály Witzmann (Fidesz)
- Website: Kapoly Online

Kapoly is a village in Somogy county, Hungary. Political leader János Kádár originates from the village, his childhood was spent in Kapoly.

== Geography ==
It lies between Siófok and Kaposvár and can be reached by car or train.

== History ==
Kapoly was first mentioned in a royal doctrine of Béla III of Hungary and the Johanniter Order of Székesfehérvár. In 1337 it appeared as Keethkapul, in 1347 as Egyházaskapoly, in 1400 as Kápolnáskapoly. It belonged to the Diocese of Székesfehérvár in 1229, but according to a papal bull also the Benedictine Abbey of Tihany had lands there. Kapoly was mentioned also in the papal tithe register between 1332 and 1337. In 1400 the lands of Kapoly were donated by Sigismund of Luxembourg to Bálint and Péter Osztopáni. Imre Ugron was its landlord in 1460. Orbán Nagylucsei Bishop of Eger, his brothers and Bernát Somogyi de Endréd got the lands of György Bálványosi in Egyházas and Kápolnás in 1488. Between 1488 and 1489 Jakab Bocskai also had lands there. The son of Pál Perneszi, Imre got Kápolnás-Kapoly from Vladislaus II of Hungary. Kápolnás-Kapoly was in the hands of Máté Baronyay, László Ewleweldy (Óleveldi), the widow of István Perneszi, Imre and Egyed Perneszi meanwhile Egyházas-Kapoly belonged to Bernát and Pál Ugron, Imre Perneszi, the Bishop of Veszprém, Mihály Kys and Máté Baronyay. According to the tax register of 1557 both Kapolys were possessions of the Perneszy family. András Perneszy de Osztopán, castellan of Felsőlendva got the village in 1577 from Rudolf II. In 1583 Kápolnás-Kapoly was owned by András Perneszi, Egyházas-Kapoly by the Bishop of Veszprém. Around 1598 and 1599 they were a possession of the Castle of Tihany under the name Nagykapoly. According to the 1609 Urbarium Nagykapoly had 10 peasant residents. The Court of Zala County awarded János Lengyel Tóti the villages of Nagykapoly, Lullya, Endréd in 1612. It was a possession of Tihany Abbey in 1645. Then in 1660 it belonged to the Perneszy family. János Perneszi gave his lands in Kis-Kapoly to János Szabó in 1665. Zsigmond Perneszi and Julianna Perneszi owned Kapoly in 1695. In the 1715 register there were 6 households and belonged to Anna Julianna Perneszi, the widow of Ferenc Babócsay. One half of the settlement was in the hands of the Perneszy family the other half in the hands of the Tihany Abbey in 1733.

Between 1720 and 1727 the first wave of German settlers arrived in Kapoly. There were also some Slovak families. But the village preserved its Hungarian dominance throughout the next centuries.

Before 1848 the Tihany Abbey, the Tallián and Csapody families had lands there. By 1900 the Abbey of Tihany was the only owner. According to the 1853 census there were 700 Hungarians, 254 Germans and 6 Jews. There was a huge cholera epidemic in 1855 when 60 people died in Kapoly.

In 1910 it had 1,020 residents of which 1,018 were Hungarians. According to their religious affiliation there were 404 Roman Catholics, 577 Calvinists and 30 Lutherans.

== Main sights ==
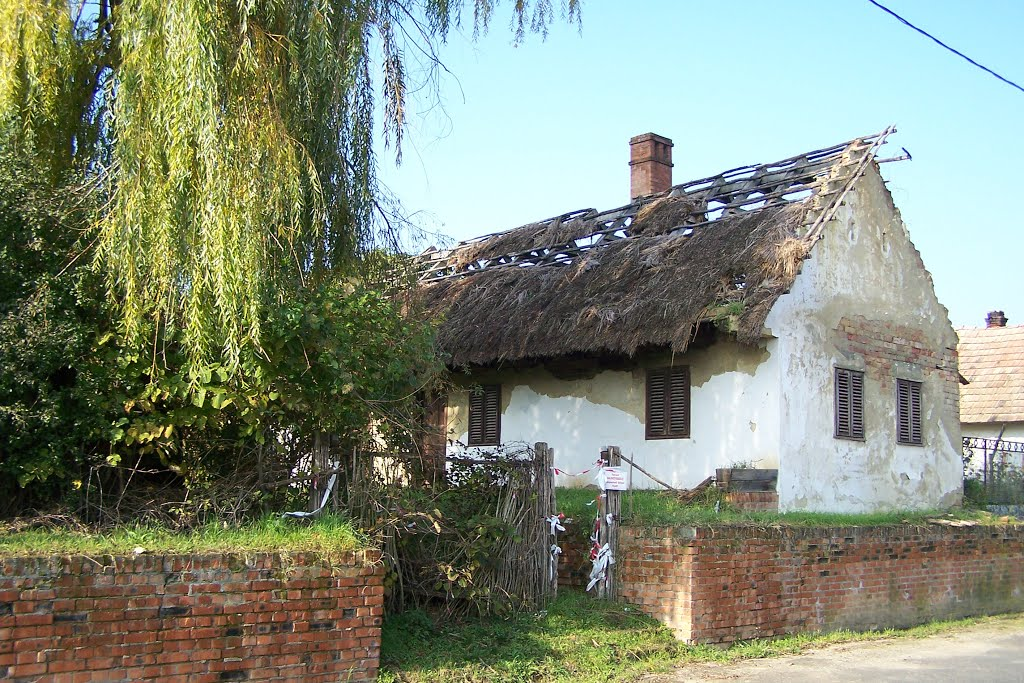
House of János Kádár in Kapoly

- Roman Catholic church
- Reformed church - built in 1838
- Kádár House - the Hungarian dictator, János Kádár lived there from the age of three months
- monument of the Second World War

== Notable residents ==
- József Vécsey de Hernádvécse (ca. 1760 – 1821), Hungarian Reformed pastor
- József Kiss (1816 – 1905), Hungarian Reformed pastor, lieutenant
- János Kádár (1912–1989), Hungarian communist leader and the General Secretary of the Hungarian Socialist Workers' Party

== Gallery ==
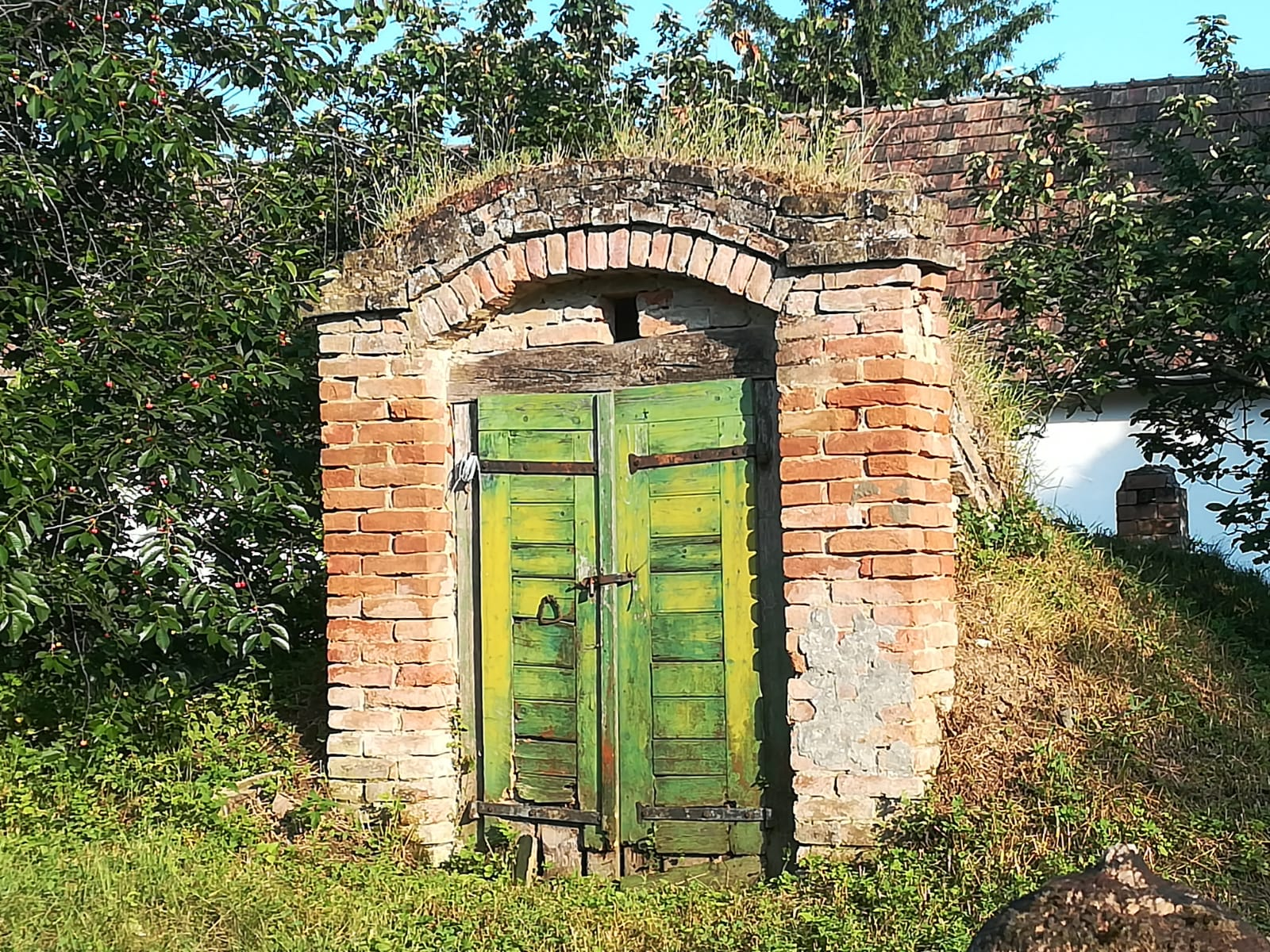
Wine cellar entrance in Kapoly

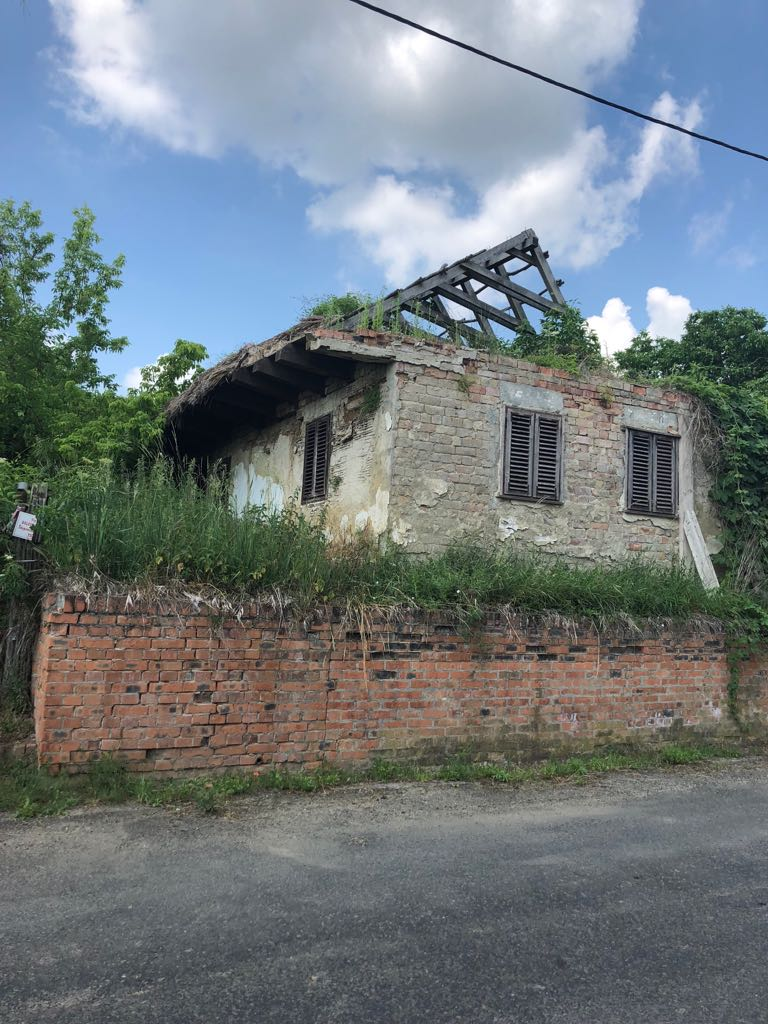
Kádár House

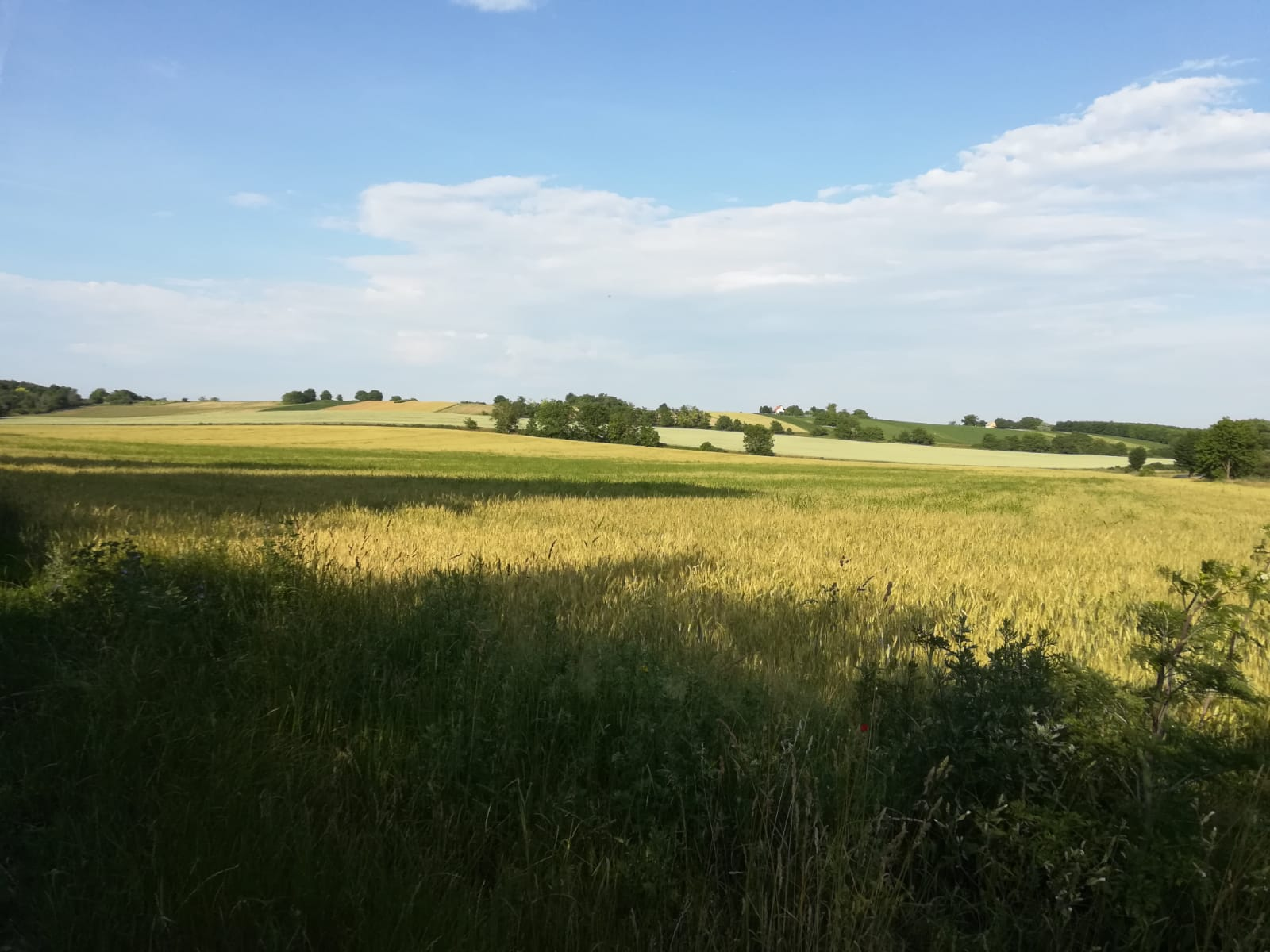
Grain field in Kapoly

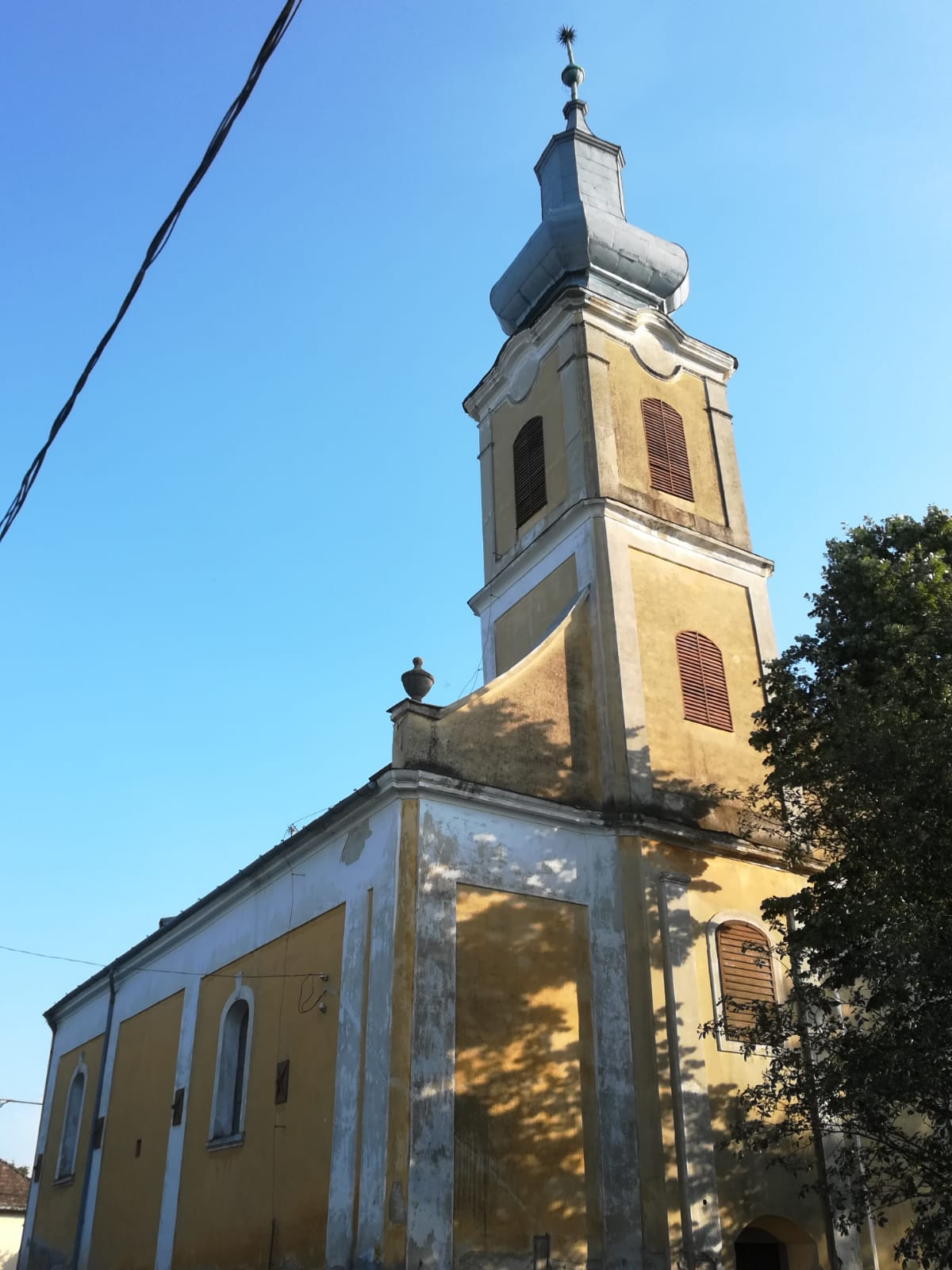
Reformed church
