= Zala (village) =

- Village
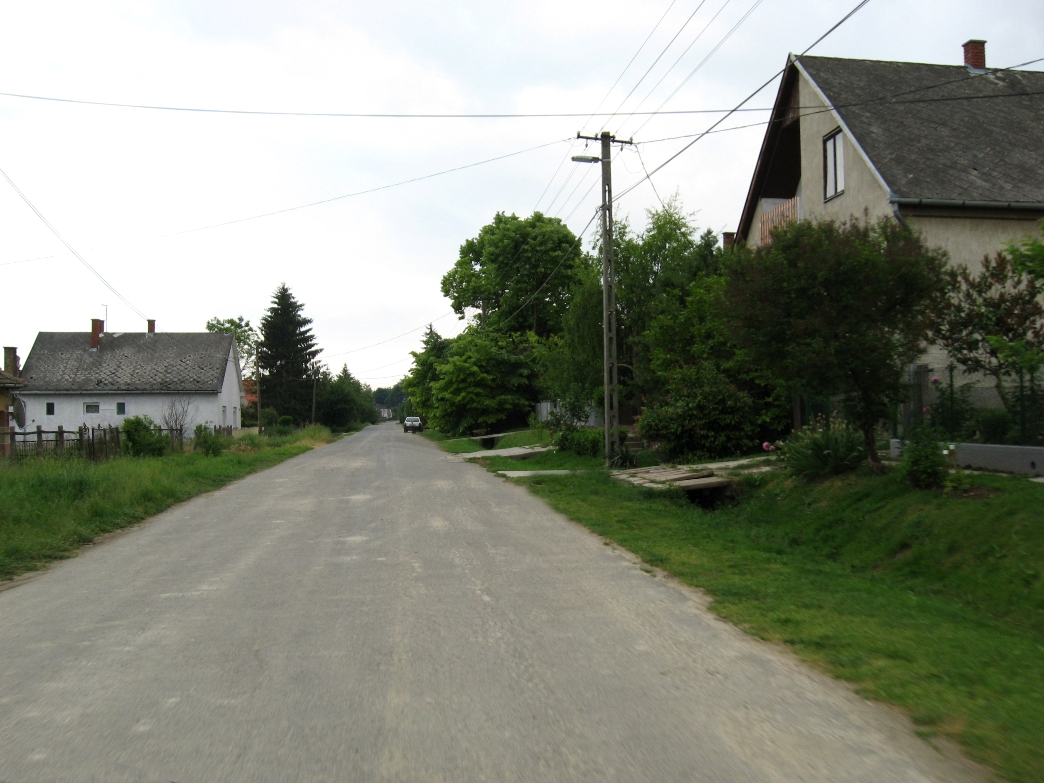
- A street in Zala

- Coat of arms

- Location of Somogy county in Hungary

- Location of Zala (village)
- Coordinates: 46.74042°N 18.00197°E
- Country: Hungary
- Region: Southern Transdanubia
- County: Somogy
- District: Tab
- RC Diocese: Kaposvár

Area
  - Total: 9.24 km^{2} (3.57 sq mi)

Population (2017)
  - Total: 243
  - Density: 26.3/km^{2} (68.1/sq mi)
- Demonym: zalai
- Time zone: UTC+1 (CET)
  - Summer (DST): UTC+2 (CEST)
- Postal code: 8660
- Area code: (+36) 84
- NUTS 3 code: HU232
- MP: Mihály Witzmann (Fidesz)
- Website: Zala Online

Zala is a village in Somogy County, Hungary.
