= Sérsekszőlős =

- Village
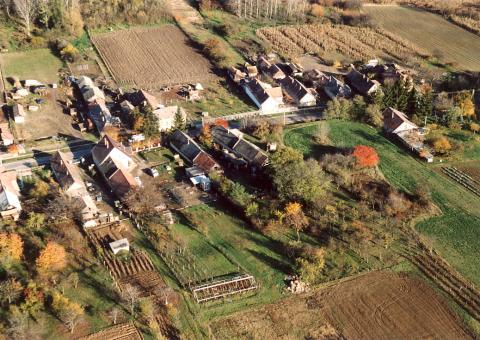
- Aerial view of the village

- Coat of arms

- Location of Somogy county in Hungary

- Location of Sérsekszőlős
- Coordinates: 46.76431°N 18.01536°E
- Country: Hungary
- Region: Southern Transdanubia
- County: Somogy
- District: Tab
- RC Diocese: Kaposvár

Area
  - Total: 6.65 km^{2} (2.57 sq mi)

Population (2017)
  - Total: 139
  - Density: 20.9/km^{2} (54.1/sq mi)
- Demonym: sérsekszőlősi
- Time zone: UTC+1 (CET)
  - Summer (DST): UTC+2 (CEST)
- Postal code: 8660
- Area code: (+36) 84
- NUTS 3 code: HU232
- MP: Mihály Witzmann (Fidesz)
- Website: Sérsekszőlős Online

Sérsekszőlős is a village in Tab District of Somogy County in Hungary.
