= Bonnya =

Bonnya Bonna / Punnia (in German)
- Village
- Coat of arms

- Location of Somogy county in Hungary

- Location of Bonnya
- Coordinates: 46.59326°N 17.90248°E
- Country: Hungary
- Region: Southern Transdanubia
- County: Somogy
- District: Tab
- RC Diocese: Kaposvár

Area
  - Total: 14.62 km^{2} (5.64 sq mi)

Population (2017)
  - Total: 228
  - Density: 15.6/km^{2} (40.4/sq mi)
- Demonym: bonnyai
- Time zone: UTC+1 (CET)
  - Summer (DST): UTC+2 (CEST)
- Postal code: 7281
- Area code: (+36) 84
- NUTS 3 code: HU232
- MP: Mihály Witzmann (Fidesz)

Bonnya (German: Bonna / Punnia) is a village in Somogy county, Hungary.

== Geography ==
It lies on the eastern side of Outer Somogy along the Brook Koppány.

== History ==
Bonnya was first mentioned as Villa Budana as the land of the Diocese of Székesfehérvár. In 1480 the settlement got market town rights. According to the tax register from 1563 the settlement belonged to the Provost of Székesfehérvár. Between 1733 and 1900 the village was in the hands of the Hunyadi family who invited German settlers in 1780 there. 231 residents of Bonnya had to leave the village during the Expulsion. In their houses Hungarians could move in from Upper Hungary according to the Czechoslovak–Hungarian population exchange.

Between 1949 and 1966 a primary school operated in Bonnya. Since then several people left the village while Austrians and Germans bought houses there and moved in.
