= Andocs =

- Village
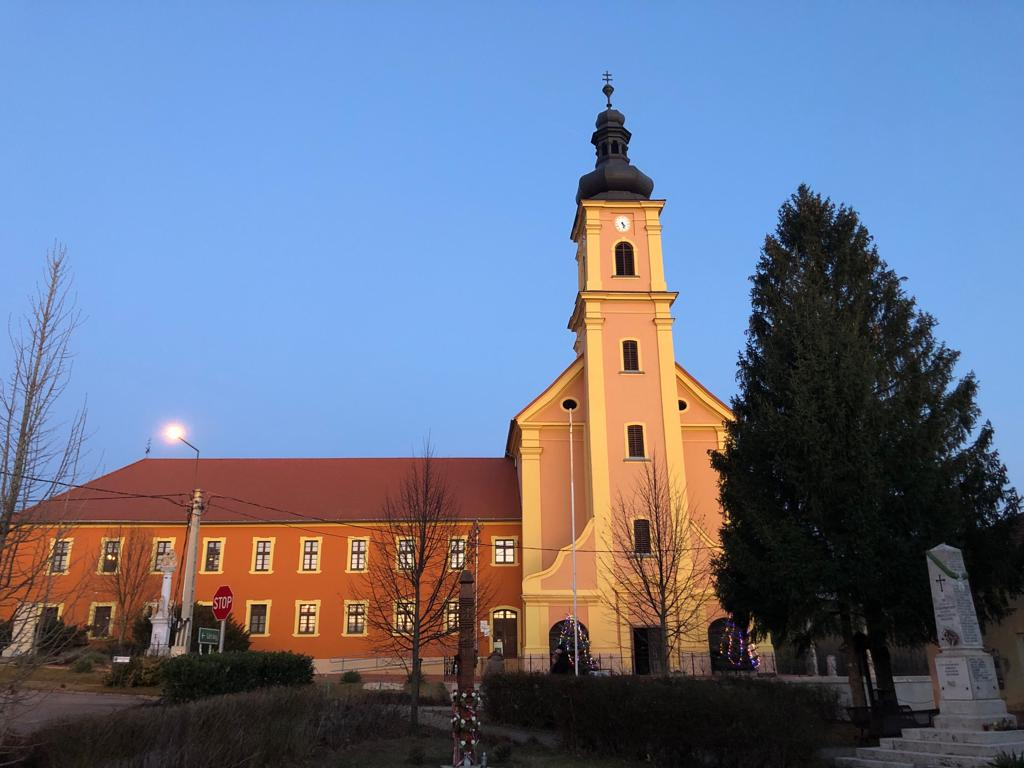
- Assumption of Mary Church in Andocs

- Coat of arms

- Location of Andocs
- Coordinates: 46.64980°N 17.92111°E
- Country: Hungary
- Region: Southern Transdanubia
- County: Somogy
- District: Tab
- RC Diocese: Kaposvár

Area
  - Total: 43.27 km^{2} (16.71 sq mi)

Population (2017)
  - Total: 1,062
  - Density: 24.54/km^{2} (63.57/sq mi)
- Demonym: andocsi
- Time zone: UTC+1 (CET)
  - Summer (DST): UTC+2 (CEST)
- Postal code: 8675
- Area code: (+36) 84
- NUTS 3 code: HU232
- MP: Mihály Witzmann (Fidesz)
- Website: Andocs Online

Andocs is a village in Somogy county, Hungary. An impoverished village in a largely rural area, though it has a venerable history and is a well-known site of pilgrimage.

The settlement is part of the Balatonboglár wine region.

== History ==
Already mentioned in the 1332-37 papal tithe records is a parish in the village. During the Turkish occupation, the Jesuit All Saints' church (also known as the church of Our Lady, "Nagyboldogasszony") and the parish were forsaken, and all that remained intact was the statue of the Virgin Mary. This was recognized as a miraculous preservation by the Jesuit priest Miklós Horváth, who developed Andocs into a place of pilgrimage between 1665 and 1681. Originally Gothic, the church was expanded with a Baroque nave in the 18th century.

In the 17th century already several miraculous incidents involving the "Mary of Andocs" were recorded; to this day, the statue is dressed every second Friday of the month. Many of the donated cloaks, following the 1747 example of Countess Katalin Széchenyi, are on display in the "Museum of the Cloaks."

A Franciscan monastery was built in 1721 but burned down a few years later, though the Gothic chapel next to it survived intact. This was another miraculous phenomenon and the chapel became the sanctuary of the current church, which was extended with a Baroque nave and consecrated in 1747, the occasion of Countess Széchenyi's donation. It was restored in the 20th century.

The chapel and the church have been a pilgrimage place for over almost four centuries. The parish feast is held on 15 August, the Feast of the Assumption; nine other feasts attract pilgrims to the village.

According to László Szita the settlement was completely Hungarian in the 18th century.

== Gallery ==
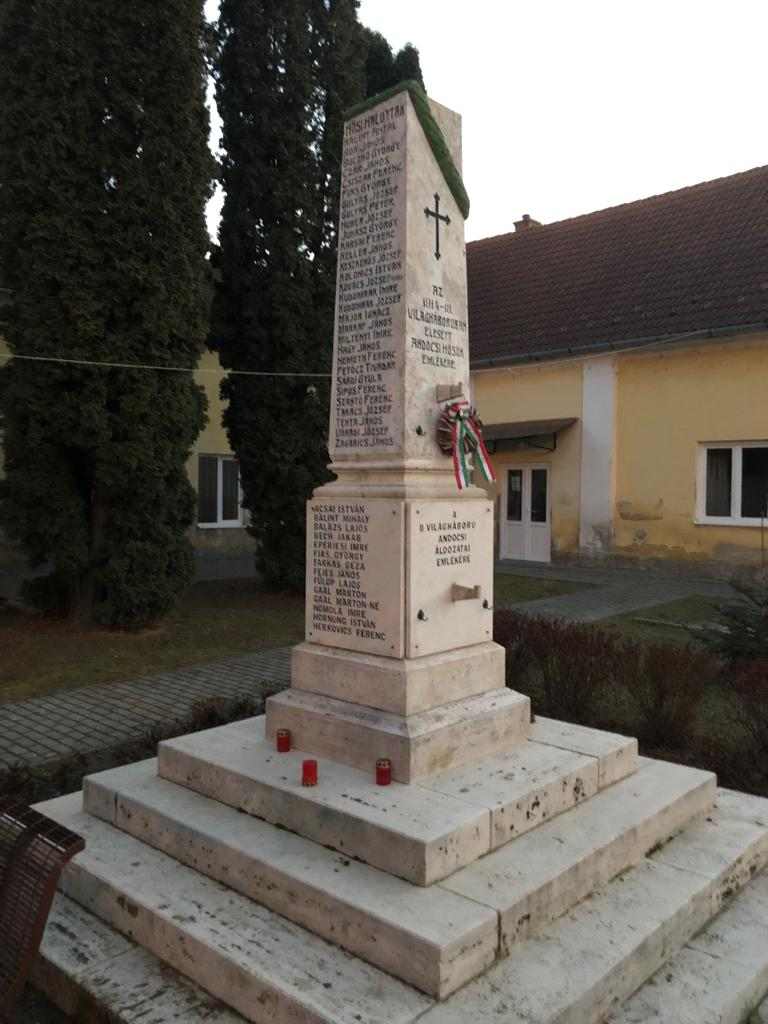
War memorial

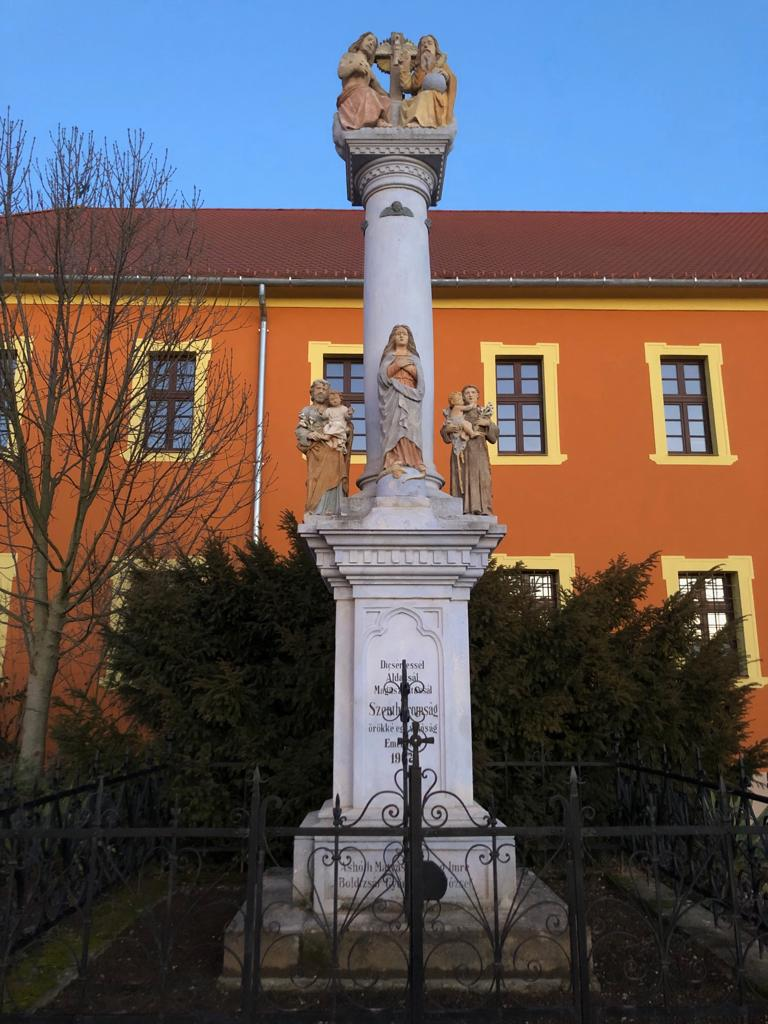
Holy Trinity column

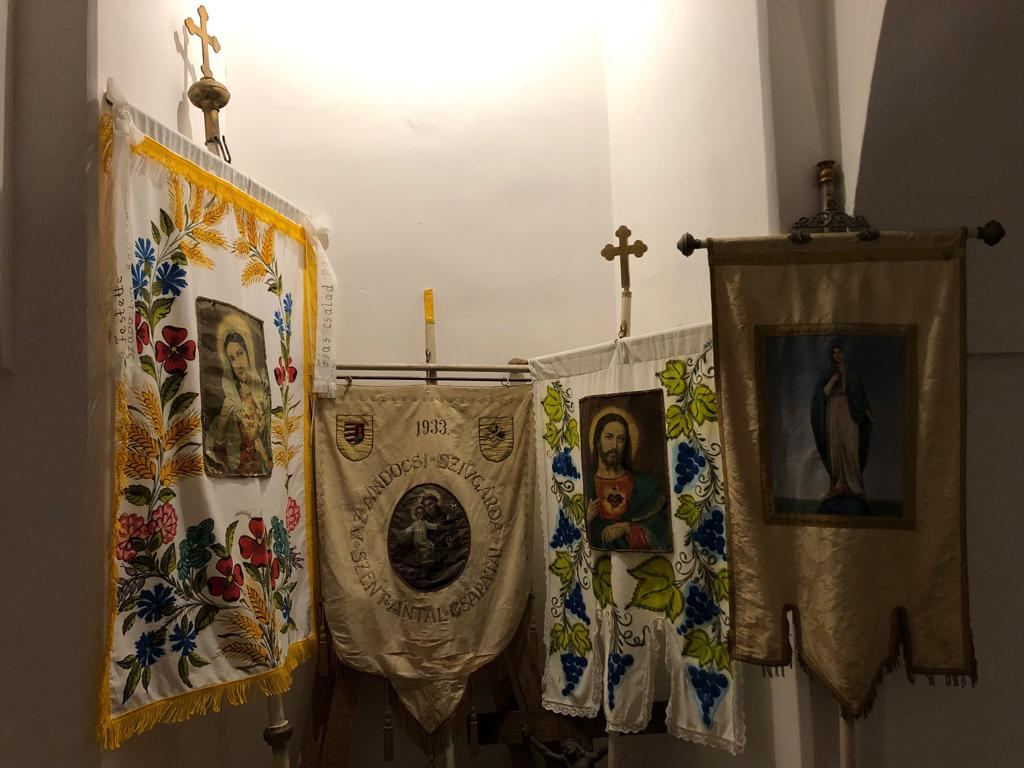
Museum of the Cloaks
