= Zics =

Village in Southern Transdanubia, Hungary

- Village
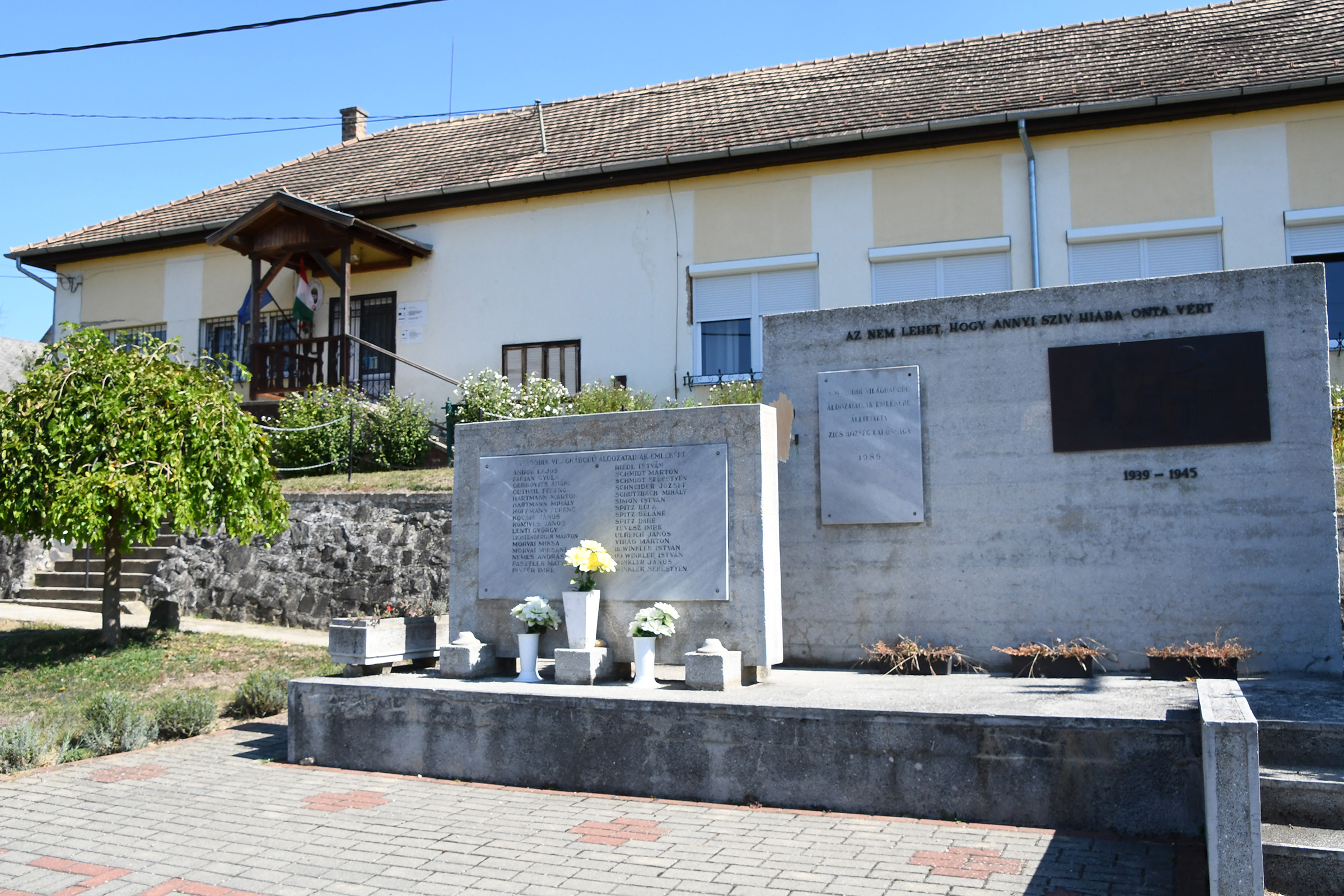
- Village hall

- Coat of arms

- Location of Zics
- Coordinates: 46.68047°N 17.98053°E
- Country: Hungary
- Region: Southern Transdanubia
- County: Somogy
- District: Tab
- RC Diocese: Kaposvár

Area
  - Total: 15.01 km^{2} (5.80 sq mi)

Population (2017)
  - Total: 320
  - Density: 21/km^{2} (55/sq mi)
- Demonym: Zicsi
- Time zone: UTC+1 (CET)
  - Summer (DST): UTC+2 (CEST)
- Postal code: 8672
- Area code: (+36) 84
- NUTS 3 code: HU232
- MP: Mihály Witzmann (Fidesz)
- Website: Zics Online

Zics is a village in Somogy County, Hungary, especially popular for Western European retirees.

== Geography ==
It lies in Outer Somogy, approximately 8 kilometres (5.0 mi) southwest of Tab and 20 kilometres (12 mi) south of Lake Balaton. The wildlife in the surrounding area includes deer, wild boar and foxes.

== History ==
Zics was first mentioned as Zvch in 1295. In 1478, the settlement belonged to György Zichy. During the Turkish occupation, it was depopulated. German settlers came in the 18th century at the invitation of the Zichy family who revived the village.

== Main sights ==
- Roman Catholic Church, built in 1786, dedicated to the Visitation
- Village hall
