= Lulla, Hungary =

Lulla
- Village
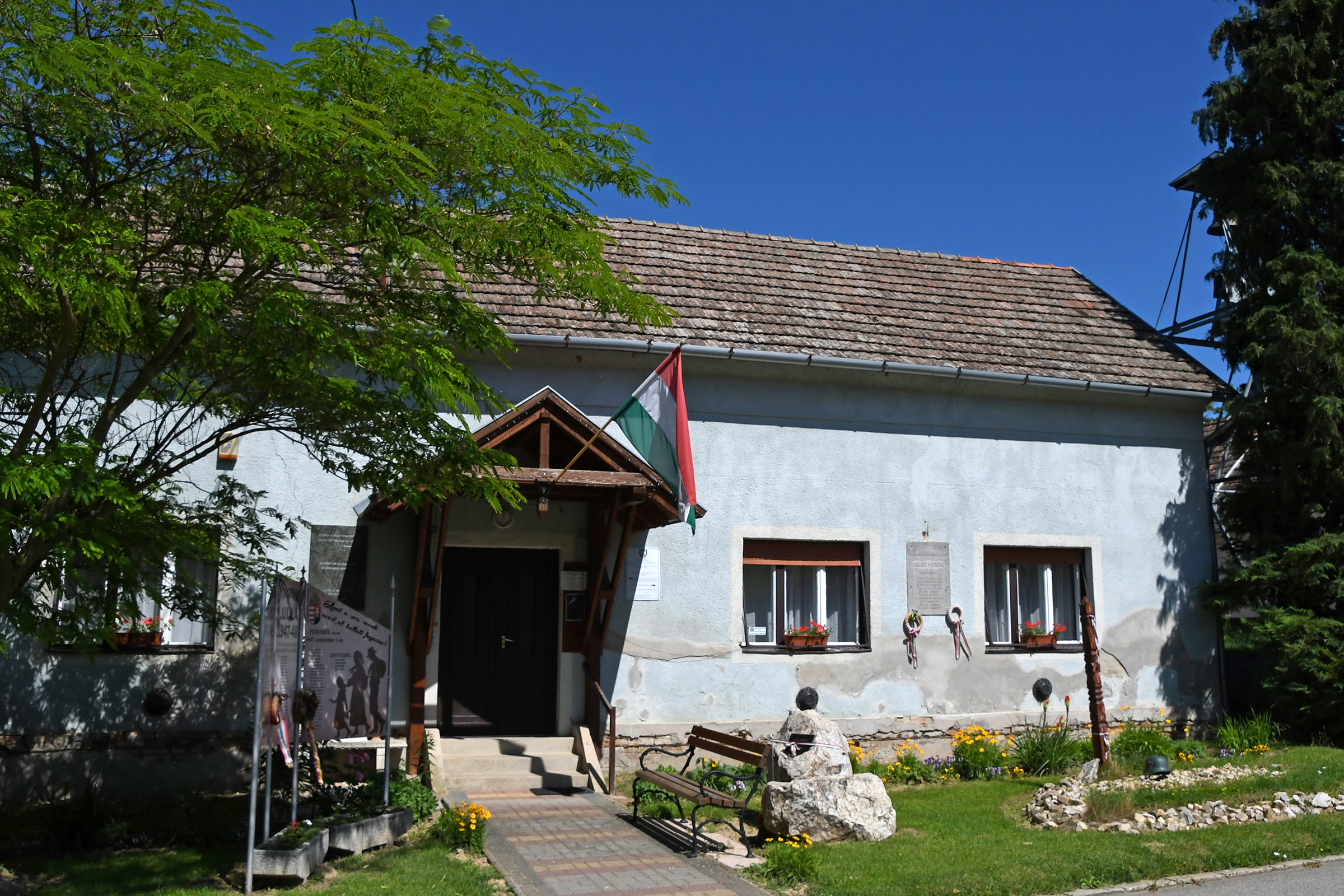
- Village hall

- Coat of arms

- Location of Somogy county in Hungary

- Location of Lulla
- Coordinates: 46.79091°N 18.02176°E
- Country: Hungary
- Region: Southern Transdanubia
- County: Somogy
- District: Tab
- RC Diocese: Kaposvár

Area
  - Total: 10.39 km^{2} (4.01 sq mi)

Population (2017)
  - Total: 187
  - Density: 18.0/km^{2} (46.6/sq mi)
- Demonym: lullai
- Time zone: UTC+1 (CET)
  - Summer (DST): UTC+2 (CEST)
- Postal code: 8660
- Area code: (+36) 84
- NUTS 3 code: HU232
- MP: Mihály Witzmann (Fidesz)
- Website: Lulla Online

Lulla is a village in Somogy county, Hungary.
