= Balatonendréd =

- Village
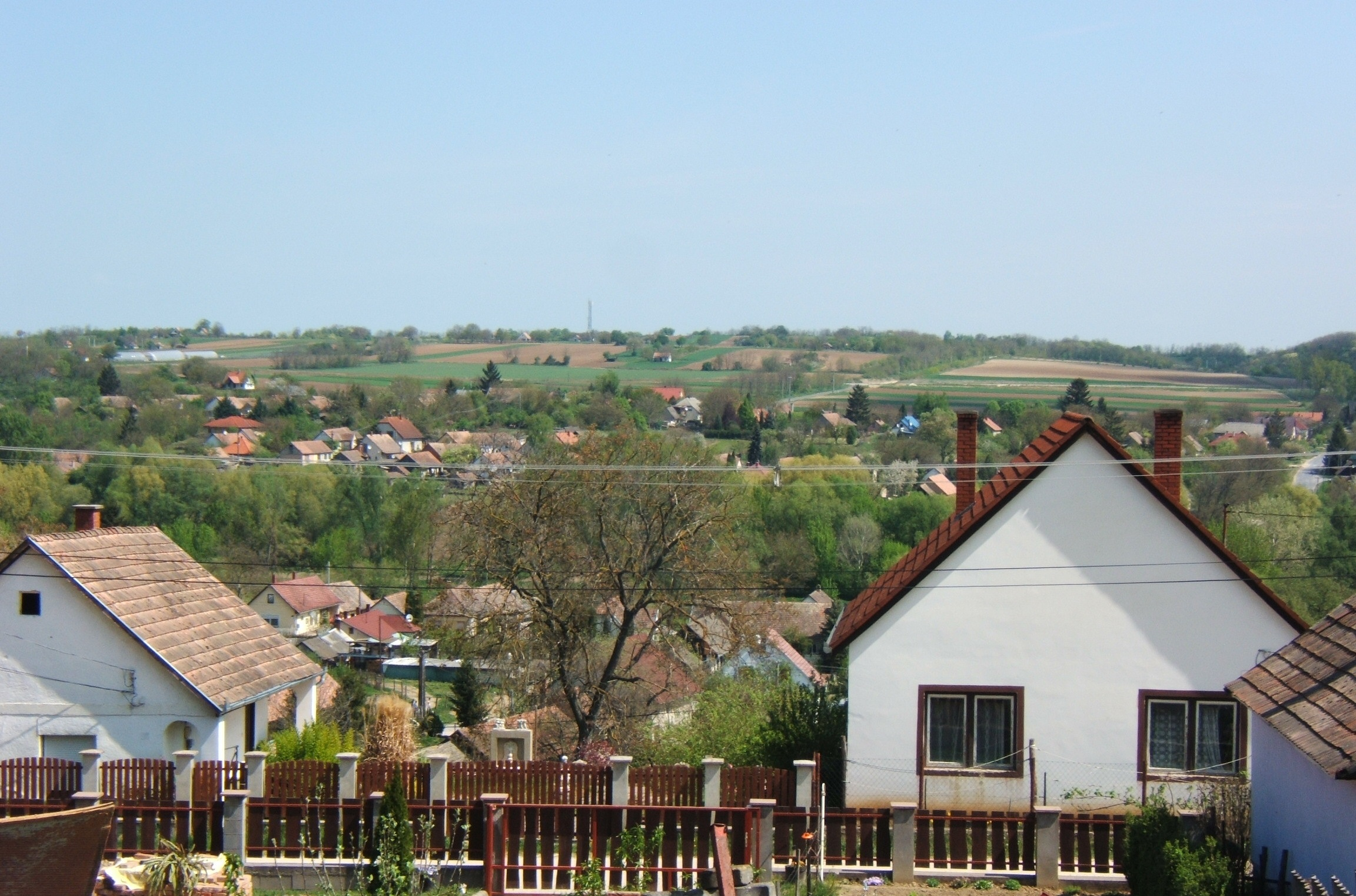
- Houses of Balatonendréd

- Coat of arms

- Location of Balatonendréd
- Coordinates: 46.84041°N 17.97813°E
- Country: Hungary
- Region: Southern Transdanubia
- County: Somogy
- District: Siófok
- RC Diocese: Kaposvár

Area
  - Total: 40.45 km^{2} (15.62 sq mi)

Population (2017)
  - Total: 1,285
  - Density: 31.77/km^{2} (82.28/sq mi)
- Demonym(s): endrédi, balatonendrédi
- Time zone: UTC+1 (CET)
  - Summer (DST): UTC+2 (CEST)
- Postal code: 8613
- Area code: (+36) 84
- Patron Saint: Andrew the Apostle
- Motorways: M7
- Distance from Budapest: 117 km (73 mi) Northeast
- NUTS 3 code: HU232
- MP: Mihály Witzmann (Fidesz)
- Website: Balatonendréd Online

Balatonendréd is a village in Somogy County, Hungary. The settlement is a holiday resort near to Lake Balaton known for its wine and for its bobbin lace. The most famous sight is the Kájel Lace Museum.

The settlement is part of the Balatonboglár wine region.

== Gallery ==
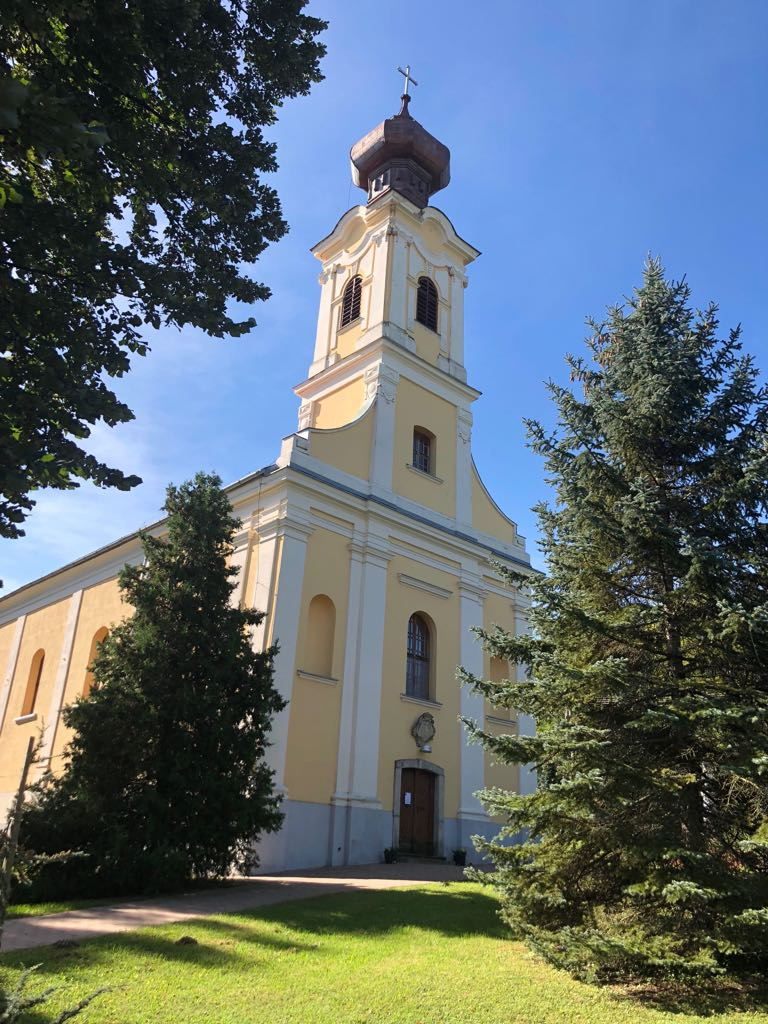
Saint Andrew Roman Catholic Church in Balatonendréd

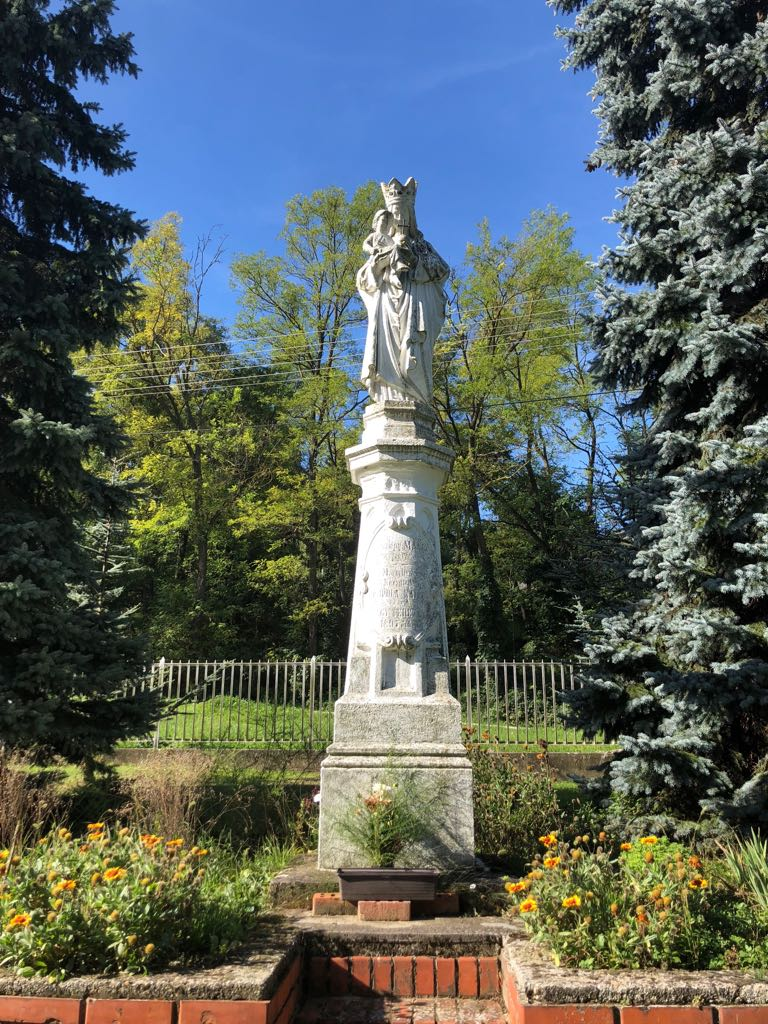
Holy Mary Column in Balatonendréd

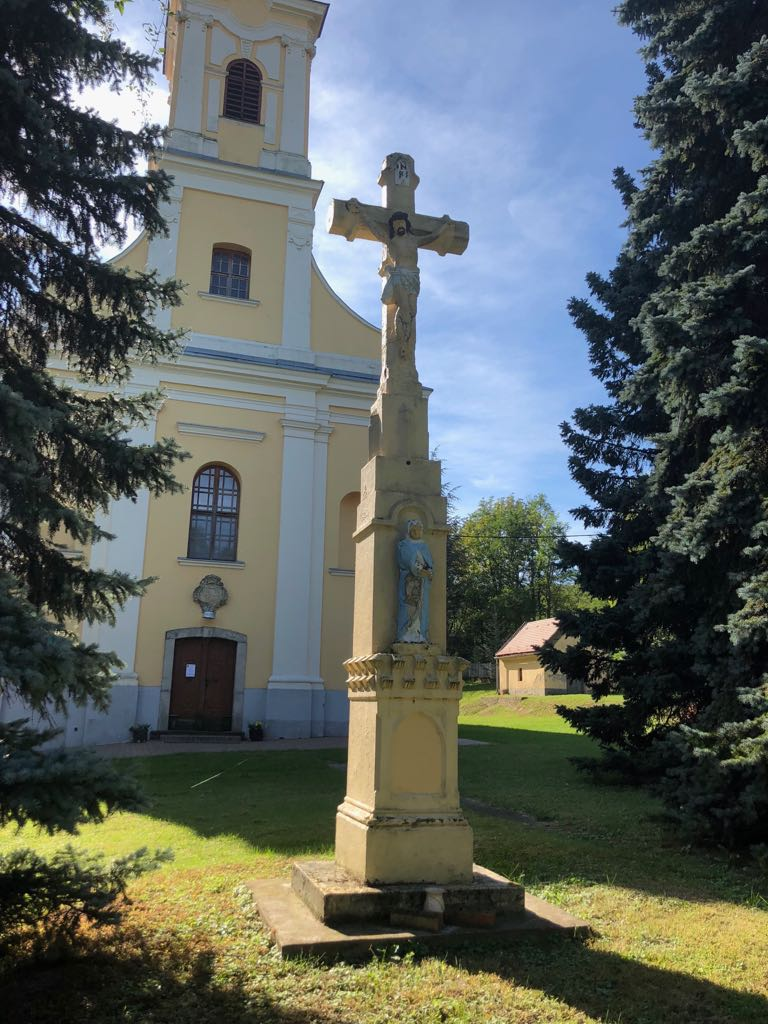
Saint Andrew Catholic Church with stone cross in Balatonendréd
