= Bedegkér =

Bedegkér Bedeg and Magyarkér (until 1939)
- Village
- Coat of arms

- Location of Somogy county in Hungary

- Location of Bedegkér
- Coordinates: 46.65151°N 18.06124°E
- Country: Hungary
- Region: Southern Transdanubia
- County: Somogy
- District: Tab
- RC Diocese: Pécs

Area
  - Total: 26.01 km^{2} (10.04 sq mi)

Population (2017)
  - Total: 389
  - Density: 15.0/km^{2} (38.7/sq mi)
- Demonym: bedegkéri
- Time zone: UTC+1 (CET)
  - Summer (DST): UTC+2 (CEST)
- Postal code: 8666
- Area code: (+36) 84
- NUTS 3 code: HU232
- MP: Mihály Witzmann (Fidesz)

Bedegkér is a village in Somogy county, Hungary. It was formed in 1939 uniting the two separate villages of Bedeg and Magyarkér.
