= Kánya =

- Village
- Coat of arms

- Location of Somogy county in Hungary

- Location of Kánya
- Coordinates: 46.617°N 18.017°E
- Country: Hungary
- Region: Southern Transdanubia
- County: Somogy
- District: Tab
- RC Diocese: Pécs

Area
  - Total: 14.51 km^{2} (5.60 sq mi)

Population (2017)
  - Total: 410
  - Density: 28/km^{2} (73/sq mi)
- Demonym: kányai
- Time zone: UTC+1 (CET)
  - Summer (DST): UTC+2 (CEST)
- Postal code: 8667
- Area code: (+36) 84
- NUTS 3 code: HU232
- MP: Mihály Witzmann (Fidesz)
- Website: Kánya Online

Kánya is a village in Somogy county, Hungary.

== Etymology ==
Its name derives from the name of its owner, Kánya.
