= Miklósi =

Miklósi Niklasing (in German)
- Village
- Coat of arms

- Location of Somogy county in Hungary

- Location of Miklósi
- Coordinates: 46.64906°N 17.9962°E
- Country: Hungary
- Region: Southern Transdanubia
- County: Somogy
- District: Tab
- RC Diocese: Kaposvár

Area
  - Total: 10.47 km^{2} (4.04 sq mi)

Population (2017)
  - Total: 200
  - Density: 19/km^{2} (49/sq mi)
- Demonym: miklósi
- Time zone: UTC+1 (CET)
  - Summer (DST): UTC+2 (CEST)
- Postal code: 8669
- Area code: (+36) 84
- Patron Saint: John the Baptist
- NUTS 3 code: HU232
- MP: Mihály Witzmann (Fidesz)
- Website: Miklósi Online

Miklósi (German: Niklasing) is a village in Somogy county, Hungary.
