= Somogyacsa =

- Village
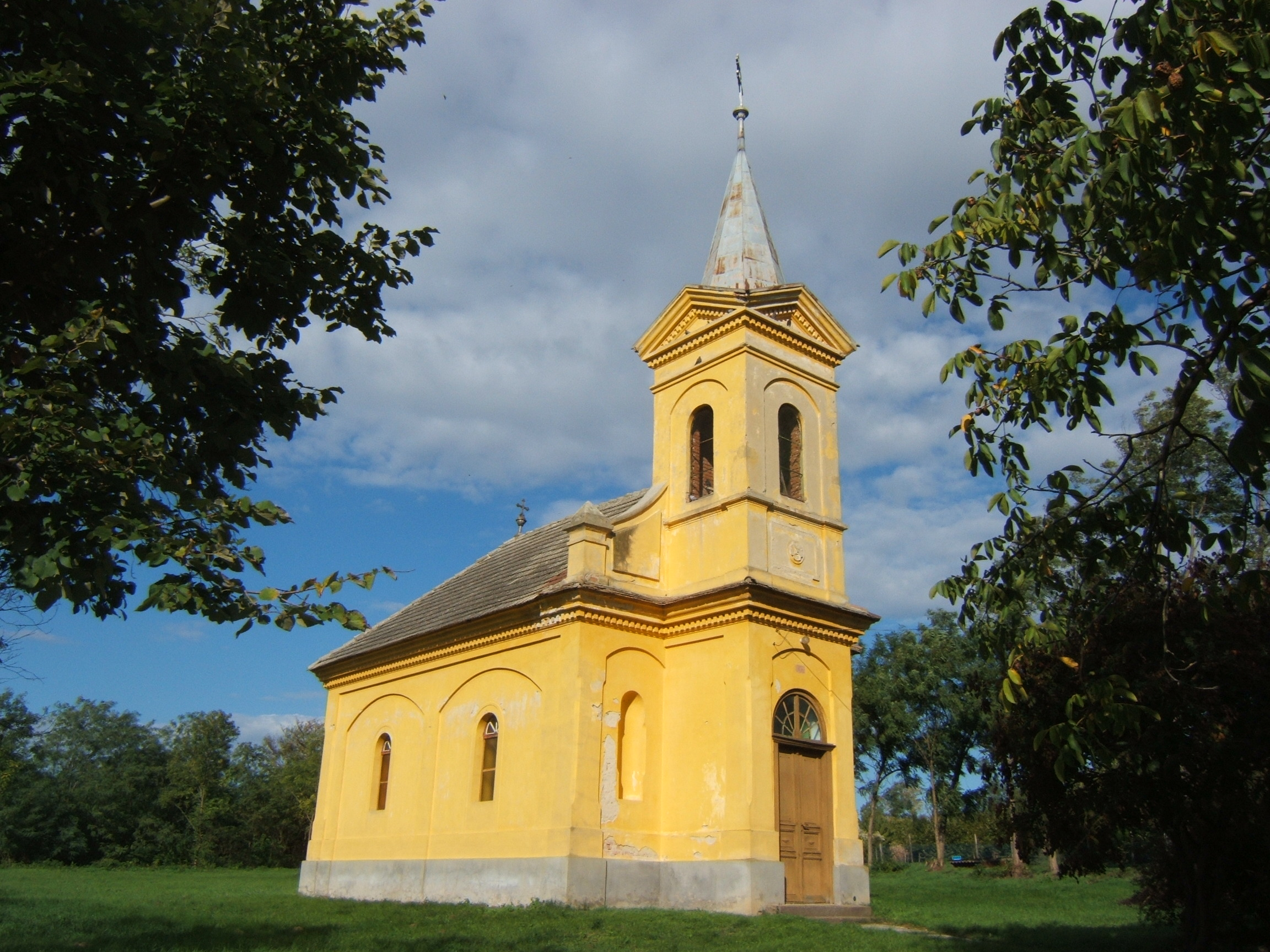
- Chapel of Gerézdpuszta in Somogyacsa

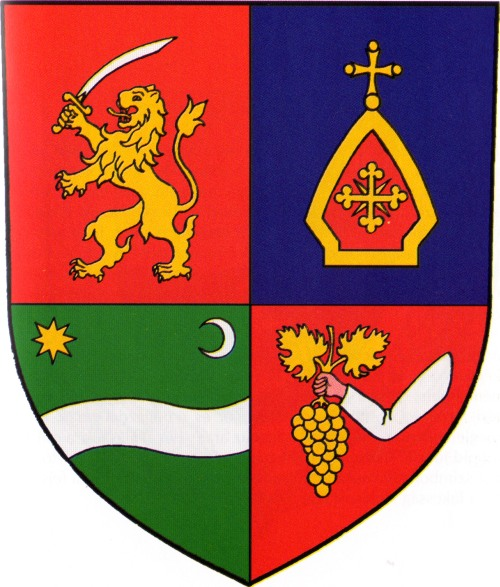
- Coat of arms

- Location of Somogy county in Hungary

- Location of Somogyacsa
- Coordinates: 46.59081°N 17.95510°E
- Country: Hungary
- Region: Southern Transdanubia
- County: Somogy
- District: Tab
- RC Diocese: Kaposvár

Area
  - Total: 24.46 km^{2} (9.44 sq mi)

Population (2017)
  - Total: 166
  - Density: 6.79/km^{2} (17.6/sq mi)
- Demonym(s): acsai, somogyacsai
- Time zone: UTC+1 (CET)
  - Summer (DST): UTC+2 (CEST)
- Postal code: 7283
- Area code: (+36) 84
- NUTS 3 code: HU232
- MP: Mihály Witzmann (Fidesz)

Somogyacsa is a village in Somogy county, Hungary. A population estimated to be about 160 people as of 2022. This quiet settlement lies in the along Koppány Valley

== History ==
Dating back to mentions in the 14th-century papal tithe records it became part of the Veszprém diocese’s holdings and was nearly abandoned during the Ottoman era. However, it was repopulated in the 18th century, benefiting from favorable conditions for agriculture once nearby areas were drained for farming. Key historical sites in Somogyacsa are Szent Márton chapel, built in 1892
