= Tab, Hungary =

Tab
- Town
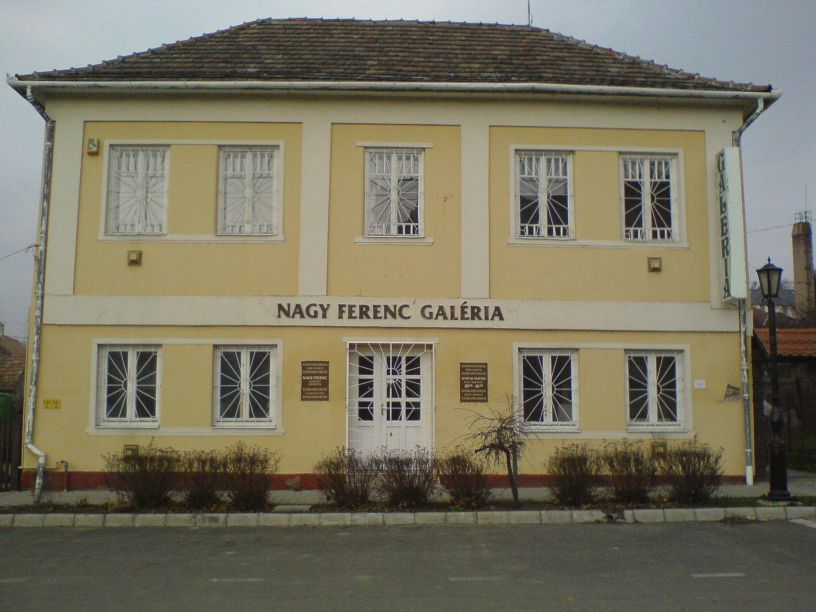
- Ferenc Nagy Gallery in Tab

- Flag Coat of arms

- Location of Somogy county in Hungary

- Location of Tab, Hungary
- Coordinates: 46.73271°N 18.03556°E
- Country: Hungary
- Region: Southern Transdanubia
- County: Somogy
- District: Tab
- RC Diocese: Kaposvár
- Market town: 1847

Area
  - Total: 25.86 km^{2} (9.98 sq mi)

Population (2017)
  - Total: 4,307
  - Density: 166.6/km^{2} (431.4/sq mi)
- Demonym: tabi
- Time zone: UTC+1 (CET)
  - Summer (DST): UTC+2 (CEST)
- Postal code: 8660
- Area code: (+36) 84
- Patron Saint: Saint Stephen
- NUTS 3 code: HU232
- MP: Mihály Witzmann (Fidesz)
- Website: Tab Online

Tab (German: Tabau) is a town in Somogy County, Hungary, and the seat of Tab District. It is situated approximately 175 km South West of Budapest and 22 km from Lake Balaton.

== History ==
Tab was first mentioned as villa Thob in an official document from 1211. In 1320 the settlement belonged to a church dedicated to Saint Peter. Between 1285 and 1386 it was in the hands of the Ugali family under the name Thob. Their surname had been eternalized by the medieval village of Ugajpuszta which is now part of Tab. Later the settlement belonged to István Rozgonyi, the ispán of Bakony and his wife, Cecília Szentgyörgyi between 1428 and 1435. In 1438 the Batthyány and Fajsz families owned it. Before the Turkish occupation it belonged to László Ewleweldi and Demeter Tharródy.

It was first attacked by the Turks in 1542, but it fell finally later between 1551 and 1553. Then Tab became part of the Nahiye of Törökkoppány. Most of its residents died or fled to other parts of the country, some moved into the woods and swamplands. According to the tax registration of the Ottoman Porte between 1573 and 1574 there were 12 tax payer households in Tab. There were occasionally fights between the Hungarian and Turkish forces. Ferenc Nádasdy and György Zrínyi with the papal garrisons attacked once the Agha of Törökkoppány and chased the Turks away for a short time.

After the Liberation of Buda in 1689 Tab became part of the Habsburg Empire. Several noble families (e.g. Fajszky, Mérey, Lengyel, Nyitray, Gussits, Nagy de Felsőbükk, Révay etc.) who had previously lands here reclaimed them, therefore they moved into the villages near Tab.

It is known from the census of 1715 that Tab welcomed Hungarians, Germans and Slovaks from 1712 on in larger numbers. Tab had one of largest Jewish communities in Somogy County which is also proven by the fact that one of the most prestigious synagogue of Somogy County was built here in 1762. Tab stood on none of the important national or international trade routes, but the local authorities thought that the settling of the Jewish community could have a strong impact on the economic development of the settlement. Between 1798 and 1800 with the financial help of the Diocese of Veszprém the local church was restored and expanded. Its sanctuary and the nobles' oratorio was decorated by the fresco of Franz Xaver Bucher in 1799. The church was built in Baroque style however the main and side altars as well as the pulpit and the desks were made in Rococo.

Tab became a market town in 1847. In 1871 it was classified as the seat of its district. According to the 1853 census of Somogy County the town had a population of 2,090 residents of which 973 were Hungarians (46.6%), 625 Jews (29.9%), 428 Slovaks (20.5%) and 64 Germans (3.0%).

At the end of the 19th century the town experienced a rapid development in infrastructure, trade and industry. Jakab Zuckermandel established a printhouse there. Ignác Pallós founded a steam brick and tile factory which employed the labor of Tab and the surroundings every year from autumn until spring. The first newspaper of the town started in 1909 under the name Tab és Vidéke (English: Tab and its Region). In 1913 the Otthon Coffeehouse started to project movies. A credit institute was founded. The sporting association of Tab was formed in 1914.

In the First World War 754 people from Tab served as soldier. After the war the nuns of the Szociális Missziótársulat started beside religious and moral lessons for the younger and older generations also handcraft, housekeeping and nursing courses. In 1928 the Népművelő Testvérek Társasága continued their work. They established a kindergarten and a folk house. A new journal was founded under the name Népapostol in 1930 which existed until 1933. There were three primary schools: a Catholic, a Lutheran and a Jewish.

In the Second World War a huge number of Polish refugees arrived to Tab. In March 1944 a ghetto was formed for the Jewish residents of Tab. The Soviets arrived on 2 December 1944.

== Main sights ==
- Roman Catholic Church – as a famous fresco by Franz Xaver Bucher, a replica of the Holy Crown of Hungary by Alajos Erényi and a walled crypt (opened on 10 June 2007)
- Ferenc Nagy Gallery
- Welsersheimb Mansion
- Statue of Saint Stephen of Hungary (2000)

== Notable residents ==
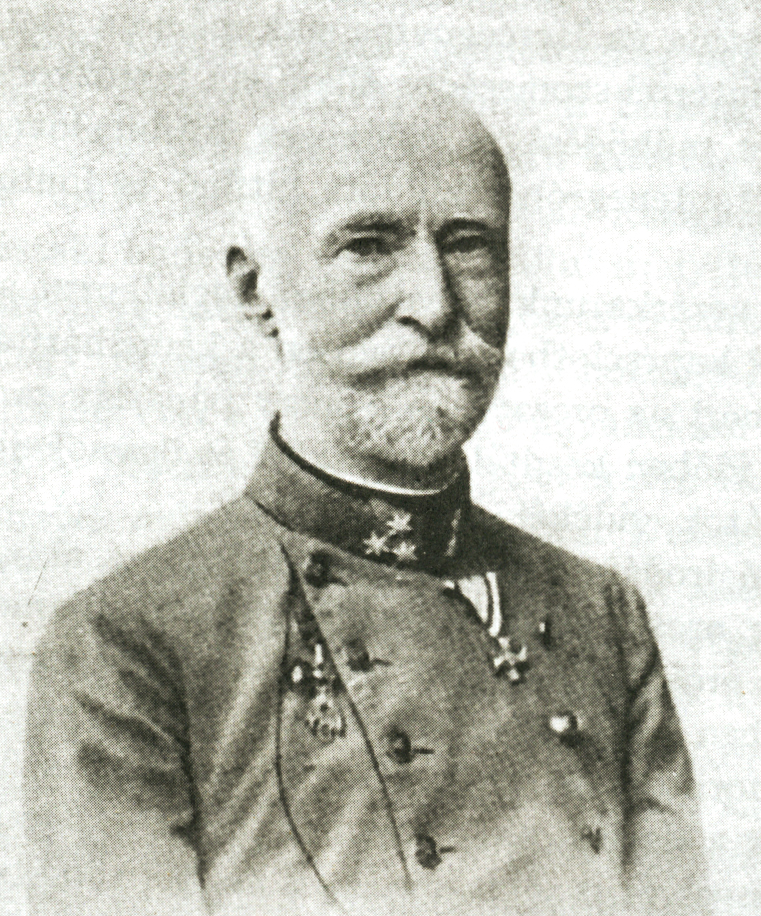
Zeno Welser von Welsersheimb (1835–1921), Austrian Minister of Defence (1880–1905) was the most well-known resident of Tab

- Bernat Rosner (born 1932), Hungarian Holocaust survivor
- Norbert Pap (1969–), Hungarian geographer–historian, founder of the Balkan Research Group, leader of the Zrinski-Suleiman Research Group
- Samuel Miklos Stern (1920–1969), Hungarian-British Orientalist
- Ferenc Nagy (1920–1998), Hungarian woodcutter artist
- Gyula Takáts (1911–2008), Hungarian poet, author, translator, teacher
- Zeno Welser von Welsersheimb (1835–1921), Austrian Minister of Defence (1880–1905)
- Gerő Buzás (1904–1987), Hungarian Roman Catholic priest, author

== International relations ==
=== Twin towns ===
- Dettenhausen – Germany
- Szímő – Slovakia
- Pered – Slovakia
- Tusnádfürdő – Romania
