= Bőszénfa =

Bőszénfa Besinge (in German)
- Village
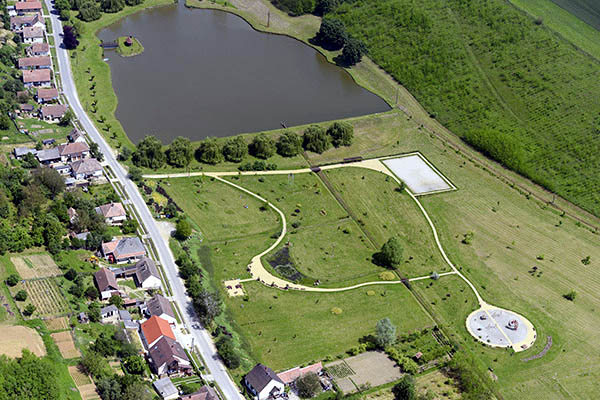
- Lake in Bőszénfa

- Coat of arms

- Location of Somogy county in Hungary

- Location of Bőszénfa
- Coordinates: 46.242223°N 17.850110°E
- Country: Hungary
- Region: Southern Transdanubia
- County: Somogy
- District: Kaposvár
- RC Diocese: Kaposvár

Area
  - Total: 42.95 km^{2} (16.58 sq mi)

Population (2017)
  - Total: 519
  - Density: 12.1/km^{2} (31.3/sq mi)
- Demonym: bőszénfai
- Time zone: UTC+1 (CET)
  - Summer (DST): UTC+2 (CEST)
- Postal code: 7475
- Area code: (+36) 82
- NUTS 3 code: HU232
- MP: Attila Gelencsér (Fidesz)
- Website: Bőszénfa Online

Bőszénfa (German: Besinge) is a village in Somogy county, Hungary.

== Geography ==
It lies 14 km (8.7 mi) south of Kaposvár next to the road 67.

== History ==
The settlement was donated by Saint Stephen of Hungary to the Pannonhalma Abbey. Its name was first mentioned between 1237 and 1240 as Bozais by Master Albeus. Before the Mongol invasion it was inhabited by swineherds of the Pannonhalma Abbey. Its medieval name was Bajszinfalva. In 1425 the sons of János Csepel de Szerdahely, Imre and Dancs as well as Márton Dersfi de Szerdahely claimed the territory against the Zselicszentjakab Abbey. In 1570 the Turkish tax register listed the village with 10 households. Between 1626 and 1627 the settlement was owned by Farkas Imrefy, in 1660 by Farkasné Imrefy. According to the tex register of 1715 there were only 6 households. It came in the hands of the Festetics family, and between 1703 and 1715 it was Pál Festetics's possession. They built also the mansion there.

In the 1770s Lajos Festetics - landlord at that time - settled the residents of Bőszénfa in his other villages and invited Roman Catholic Germans to Bőszénfa. In 1773 the village already had its own teacher. A new parsonage was established in 1787. During the reign of Joseph II it had 296 inhabitants, in the middle of the 19th century already 671 people. According to the census of 1870 there were 106 houses and 851 residents in the settlement. There was also remarkable industry with wooden shoe production, masonry, carpenters and cartwrights. A steam brick factory and a steam mill operated there. Its inhabitants worked in summer on the fields and in winter they cut woods in the forests. In 1910 out of its 984 residents, 586 were Germans and 397 Hungarian. According to the religious affiliation of the citizens there were 960 Roman Catholics, 19 Calvinists and 5 Jews.

After the Second World War 70 German families were deported under the Expulsion of Germans. In their houses 20 Hungarian families could move in due to the Czechoslovak–Hungarian population exchange.

Kisbőszénfa, Rókamalom-major and Szenttamás-puszta were all parts of Bőszénfa.

== Main sights ==
- Roman Catholic Church (The first one was built in 1777, but Pál Festetics replaced it with this one in 1902 and was dedicated to Saint Notburga.)
- stable and granary built in the 19th century
- In the valley of the Brook Surján runs a tourist path through the animal farm of the University of Kaposvár. Different types of cattle, boars, donkeys etc. can be seen there.

== Gallery ==
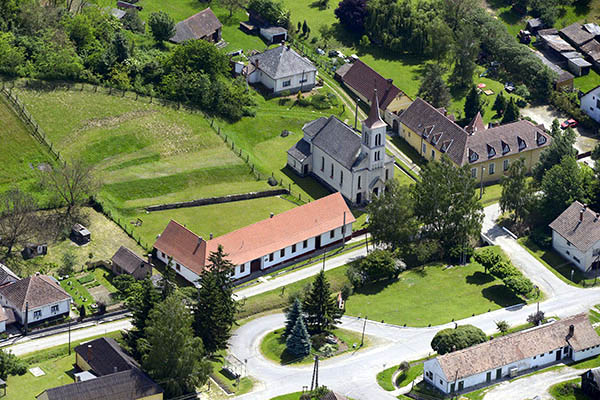
Main square with the Roman Catholic Church

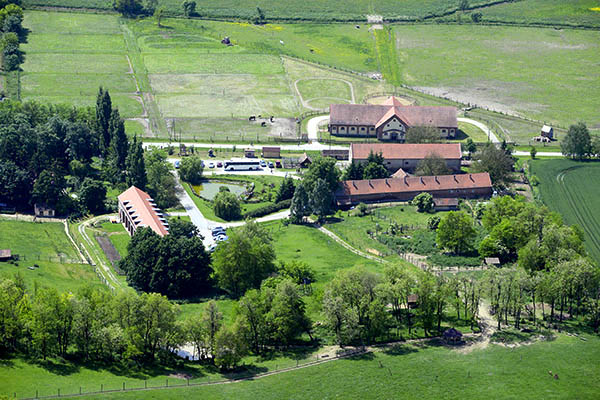
Animal farm of the University of Kaposvár

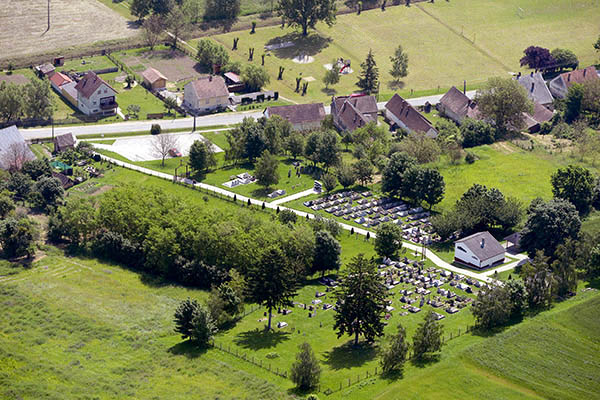
Cemetery of Bőszénfa

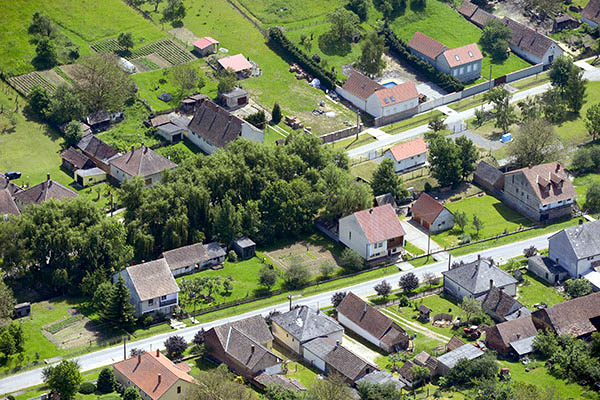
Houses in Bőszénfa

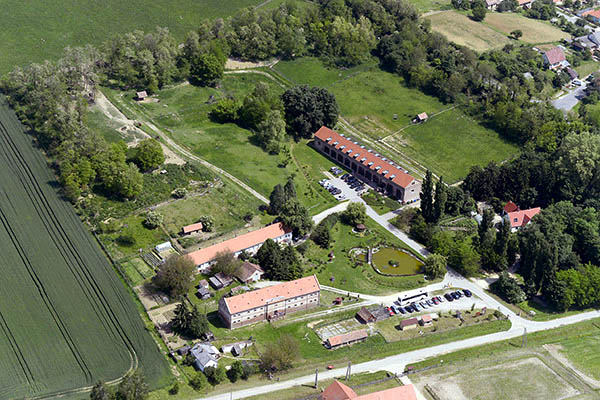
Farm in Bőszénfa

== Literature ==
- Hajdó Lászlóné - Dr. Takács Éva: A kaposvári járás községtörténeti lexikona - Iskola és Levéltár 21. (Kaposvár, 1984)
