= Gergely Csiky =

Hungarian dramatist

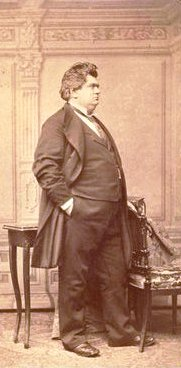
Gergely Csiky

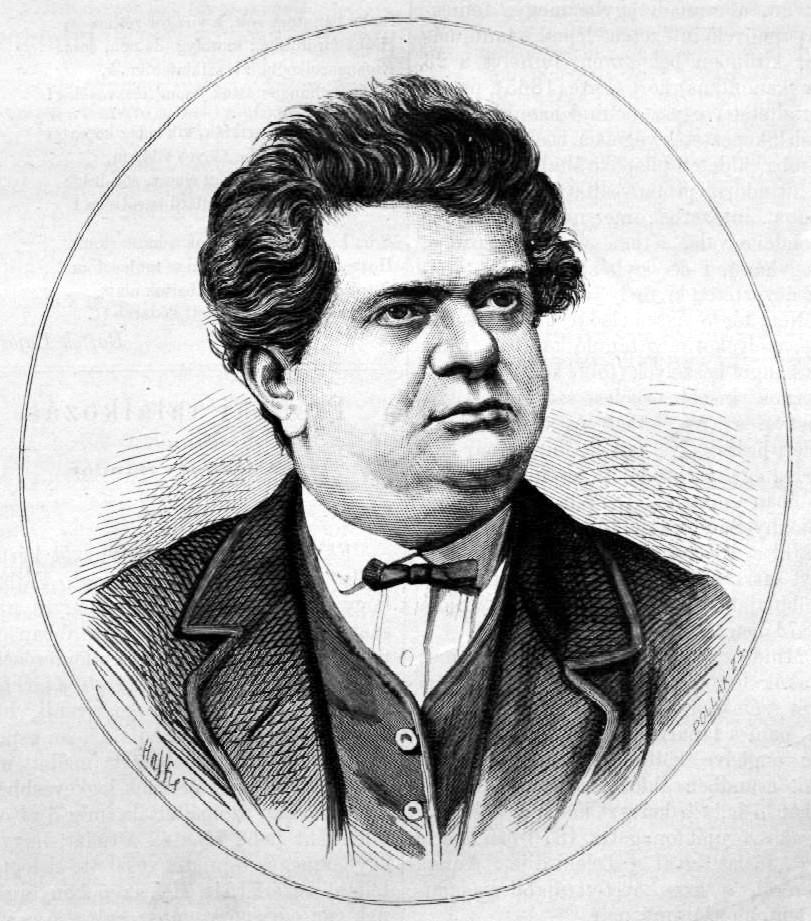
Gergely Csiky

Gergely Csiky (also Gregor Csiky; 8 December 1842 – 19 November 1891) was a Hungarian dramatist of Armenian ancestry (his mother's family is of the Verzár family that was initially called as Stefanian).

Csiky was born in Pankota, in the county of Arad. He studied Roman Catholic theology at Pest and Vienna, and was professor in the Priests College at Timișoara from 1870 to 1878. In the latter year, however, he joined the Evangelical Church, and took up literature. Beginning with novels and works on ecclesiastical history, which met with some recognition, he ultimately devoted himself to writing for the stage.

Here his success was immediate. In his Az ellenállhatatlan (Irresistible), which obtained a prize from the Hungarian Academy of Sciences, he showed the distinctive features of his talent: directness, freshness, realistic vigor, and a highly individualistic style. In rapid succession he enriched Magyar literature with realistic genre pictures, such as A Proletárok (Proletariat), Buborékok (Bubbles), Két szerelem (Two Loves), A szégyenlős (The Bashful), Athalia, etc., in all of which he seized on one or another feature or type of modern life, dramatizing it with intensity, qualified by chaste and well-balanced diction. Of the latter, his classical studies may be taken as the inspiration, and his translation of Sophocles and Plautus were the most successful of Magyar translations of the ancient classics. Among his novels are Arnold, Az Atlasz család (The Atlas Family). He died in Budapest.

The Csiky Gergely Theatre of Kaposvár and the Hungarian Theatre of Timișoara bear his name.
