= Martin Helstáb =

Hungarian film director

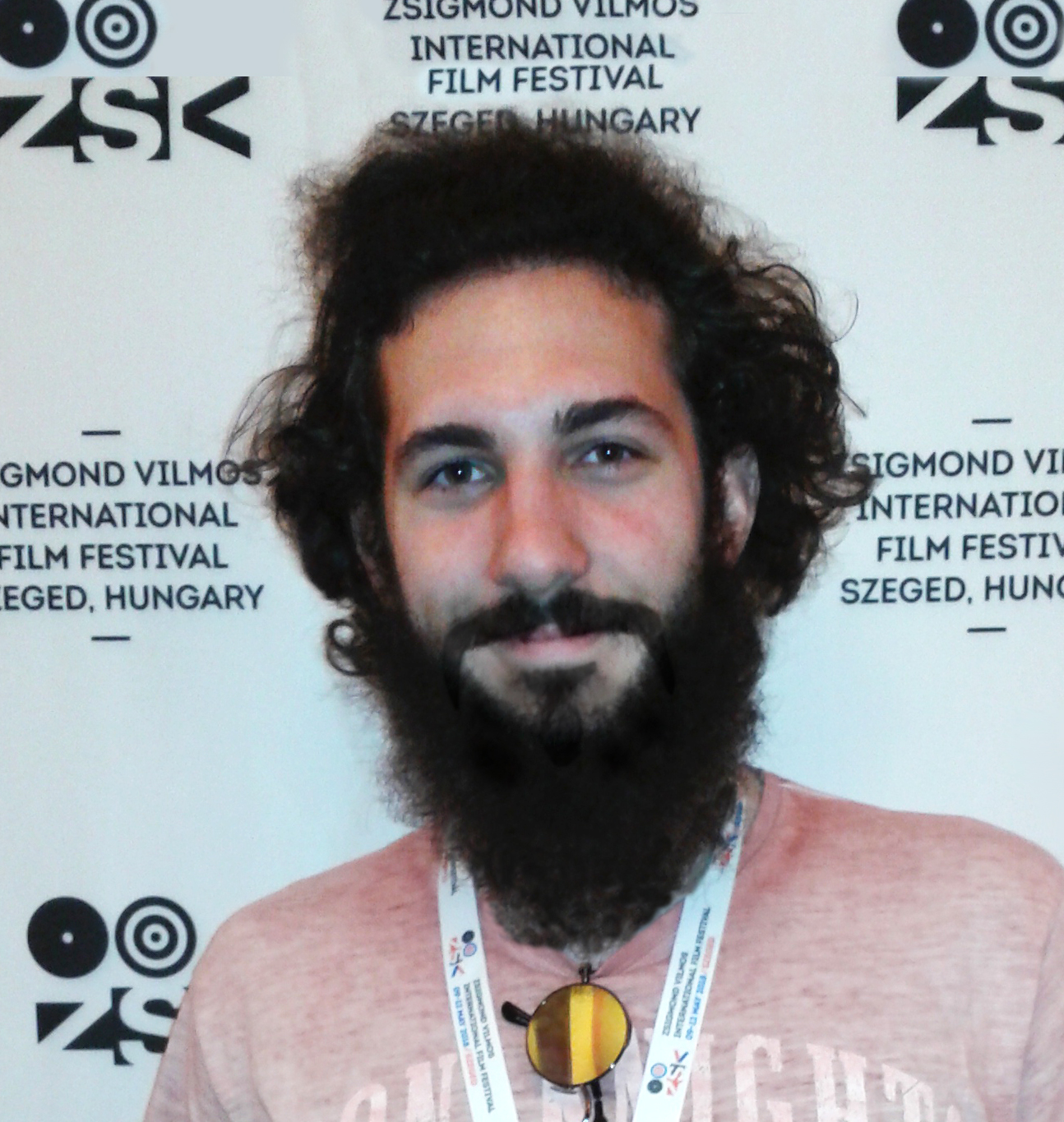
- Helstáb in 2018
- Born: March 23, 1995 (age 31); Pécs, Hungary
- Education: University of Kaposvár (BA); University of Pécs (MFA, MA, HND)
- Occupations: Filmmaker; screenwriter; visual artist; composer; biohacker
- Years active: 2014–present

Martin Helstáb (born March 23, 1995) is a Hungarian film director, visual artist, and biohacker. His animated short films gained international recognition, and he's a prominent figure in the global longevity community by his rejuvenating self-experiment and radical life extension activism.

His art explore the anomalies of bodily experiences, from illness and death to life extension and cyborgization. His style is characterized by humor and experimentation across different genres. He works mostly alone on his movies. His 2021 debut feature film is Zazongpari for which he won the Luis Buñuel Memorial Award. He made his short films in Hungarian language, then he changed to English in his feature film. His films have been shown in several film festivals worldwide, Decent Hoggery (2023) was premiered at the 63rd Zlín Film Festival. Helstáb's first short film The Mouse Who Wanted to Be a Mouse had been screened at the 25th Palić European Film Festival.

== Early life and education ==
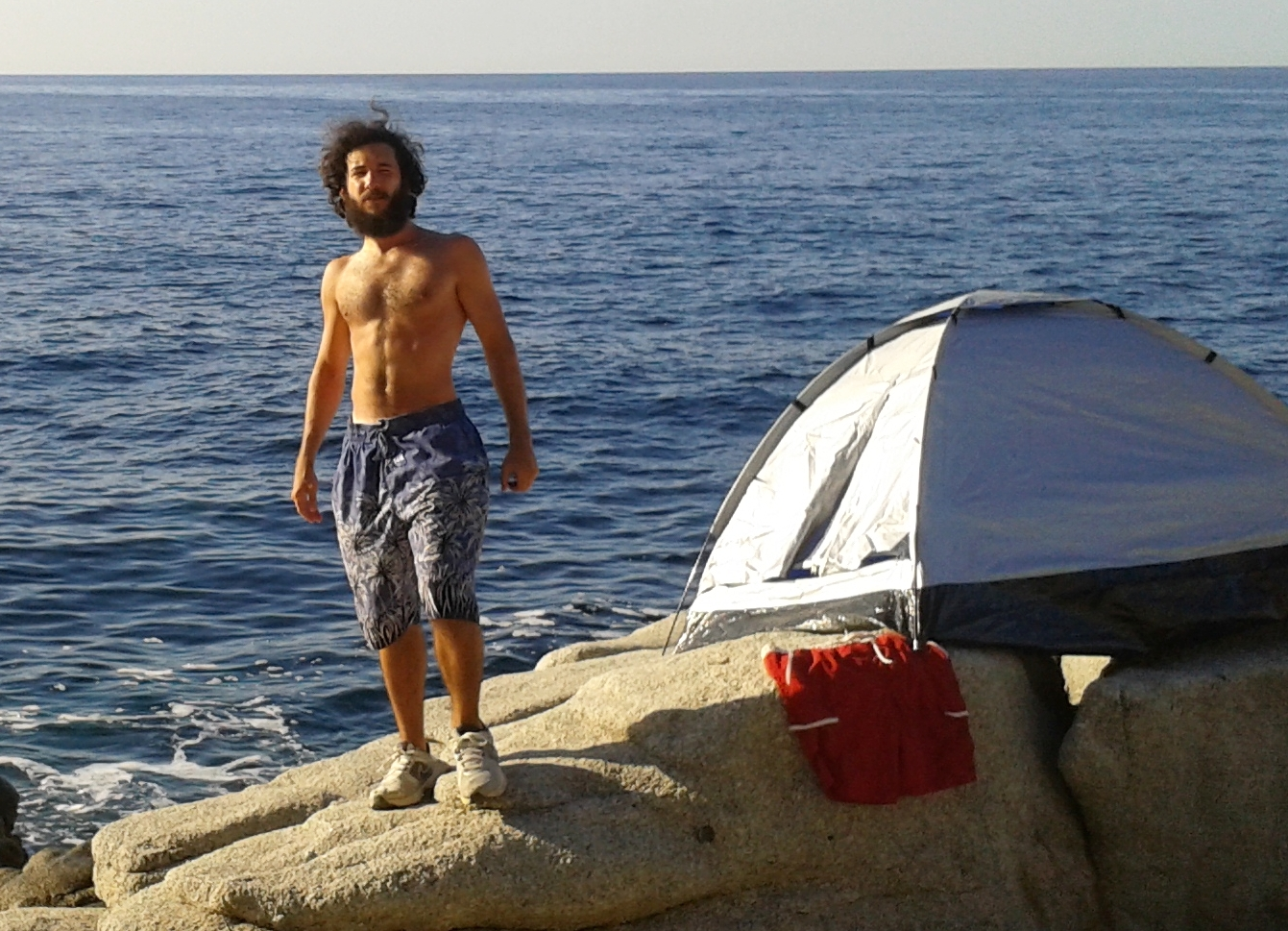
Martin Helstáb spending months in a tent at the Costa Brava, 2018

Martin Helstáb was born in Pécs, Hungary on 23 March 1995. He attended Martyn Ferenc Art School for 13 years, where he gained his interdisciplinary fine art basics. The art school was founded by Ferenc Lantos painter, who developed a unique method of art education focusing on interdisciplinarity and creation related to the understanding of natural structures. This established Helstáb's interest in natural science and the animal world. His goal was to become a zoologist, so from 2013 he attended biology (BSc) at the University of Pécs. He participated researches in the field of behavioral ecology, but after two semesters he dropped out due to his first screenwriting successes on environmental film contests. In 2016 he graduated in Television Production (HND) from the University of Pécs, and in 2020 in Film and Media Studies (BA) from the University of Kaposvár. He attended the class of Sándor Csoma and David Borbás film directors. In 2017 he founded his own animation studio, creating commercial and educational video and graphic works. On the summer of 2018 he spent more than two months at Spain's southeastern coastline wilderness, the Costa Brava, sleeping in a tent, leading a nomadic lifestyle with the intention of „hardening his spirit“. He learnt octopus hunting from an old Catalan fisherman, and frequently cooked octopus tentacles in trashed Fanta-cans. In 2022 he graduated as a Documentary Film Director (MFA) at the University of Pécs. He attended the class of Péter Lichter, experimental film director and film theorist. In 2023 he gained his fourth college degree as a Teacher of Design and Visual Arts (MA) from the University of Pécs.

== Filmmaking career ==
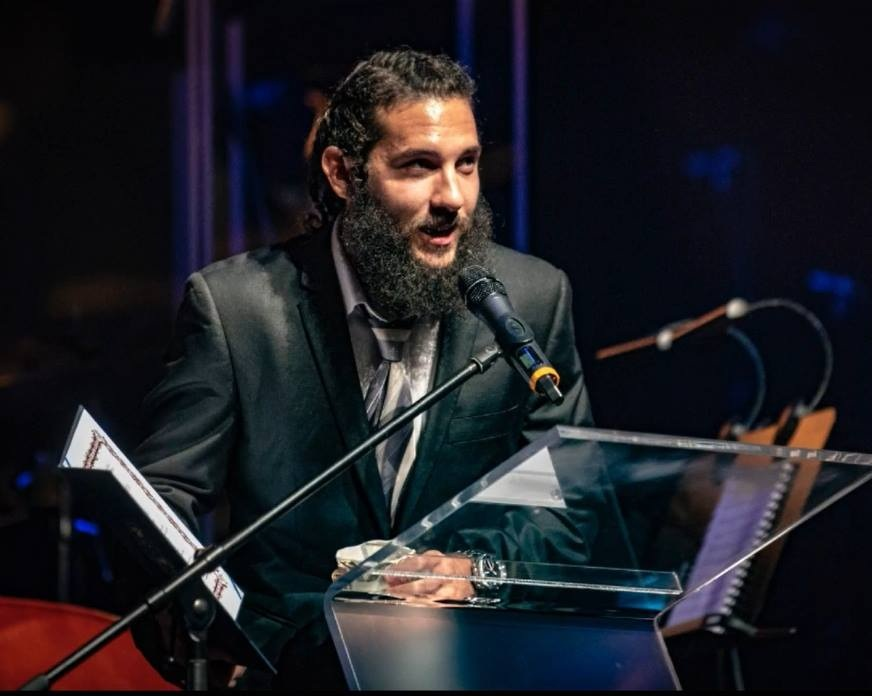
Helstáb awarded the Márk Tamás Prize in 2018

Since 2014 after winning a national competition in screenwriting, he created several short films with various themes and techniques. He made live action experimental films like The Mouse Who Wanted to Be a Mouse (2015) or Flat Frogs (2017). He directed animated films like Bug's Breakfast (2016), Mucus (2017) and Carry on Dying (2018) which was screened at the 15th Kecskemét Animation Film Festival. He shot documentaries such as Much-Much Paint (2018) and My Dreams Answer (2022). Helstáb created and starred in (mixed technique) live action films like Feast of the Condor (2020) and his feature film Zazongpari (2021). In 2018 the city of Pécs awarded him the Márk Tamás Prize for his achievement in the field of filmmaking, creative culture and for his works in the underground music composing scene. The award committee highlighted his successful entertaining activity as a rapper by the stage name NagyQtya (translated: BigDog).

He worked on Zazongpari for 5 years, shot it in a greenscreen studio in his parents' garage. He gained 10 kilogrammes of muscle to build the physique to play the protagonist Scavenger Monk in his movie. The film contains several fighting sequences which roots from Martin Helstáb's training in Kashima Shinden Jikishinkage-ryū kenjutsu by grandmaster Suzuki Kimiyoshi. The story follows a monk - played by Helstáb - on his quest through an enchanted forest, fighting ghosts and monsters along the way. Zazongpari won the best experimental film award in Singapore at the World Film Carnival in 2021, which resulted its nomination for the Golden Merlion Awards in 2022.

He created an animated short film from 2022 to 2023 titled Decent Hoggery in which he also plays a key role, along with his partner, Eszter Zsigrai fine artist. The film resembles his earlier dialogue-based animal starred animated shorts, but in this work he used more experimental techniques, like animating scanned bacon or rotoscoping a dream sequence. Decent Hoggery was shown at the Innsbruck Nature Film Festival and premiered at the Zlín Film Festival where critics praised it for the politically incorrect humor. In 2023, Martin Helstáb resided at Malta, continuing his artistic work on the southern European island.

== Life extension activism: biohacking and transhumanist art ==
Martin Helstáb explicitly includes radical life extension and transhumanist philosophy in his films since 2020. His short Feast of the Condor is about obtaining the genetic code of an animal with long lifespan, Zazongpari is about the cyborgization of the protagonist, and his 2026 film Age of Empty Cemeteries follows cryogenically preserved people who wake up in a future where technology defeated death. As these are live action movies made alone, Helstáb uses his optimized body composition for these roles.

He started biohacking practices in 2019 after being diagnosed with rheumatoid arthritis and told that his lifespan will be shorter due to the chronic inflammation. Until 2025 he'd built up a strict protocol for rejuvenating his body and joined the athletes of the Longevity World Cup. In 2026, at the 2nd season of the global biohacker competition he ranked up the 4th place by reducing his age by 18,2 years. His daily habits include a mediterranean diet with chicken liver and extra virgin olive oil, 5 km running and 30 minutes strength training, sauna, infrared light therapy, accupressure mat, 20+ supplements, TENS machines, circadian rhythm-resetting wild camping, sleep tracking, and skincare. He is an active part of the global longevity community appearing in podcasts and writing publications about body optimization and life extension aiming to live forever.

== Filmography ==
=== Feature films ===
- The Combination Lock (2014) - video production
- Zazongpari (2021)

=== Short films ===
- The Mouse Who Wanted to Be a Mouse (2015)
- No More Last One (2015)
- Bug's Breakfast (2016)
- Mucus (2017)
- Flat Frogs (2017)
- Carry on Dying (2018)
- Much-Much Paint (2018)
- Feast of the Condor (2020)
- My Dreams Answer (2022)
- Decent Hoggery (2023)
- Age of Empty Cemeteries (2026)

== Exhibitions ==
=== Group exhibitions ===
- 2002 - Disciples of the Martyn Ferenc Art School, Library of Pécs, Pécs
- 2007 - Connections, Basement system, Pécs
- 2009 - Lantos 80, Parti Gallery, Pécs
- 2012 - Art Residents' Exhibition, Cultural Center, Balatonberény
- 2012 - Olympics through students' eyes, Sports Museum of Hungary, Budapest
- 2015 - Hommage á Lantos, House of Arts, Pécs
- 2018 - The world is wide..., Knowledge Center, Pécs
- 2019 - Vad Art, Anker't, Budapest
- 2019 - Bauhaus Up!, Rippl Gallery, Kaposvár
- 2022 - #RIPPLportre, Rippl Gallery, Kaposvár
