= Ede Magyar =

Hungarian architect

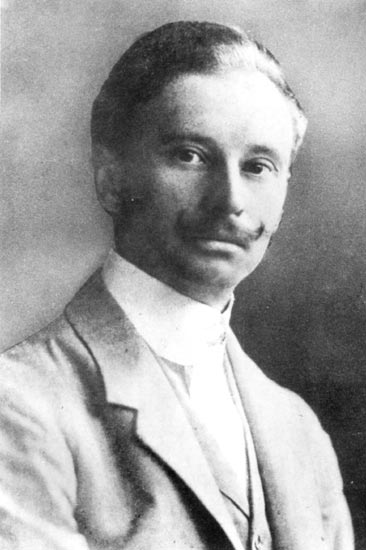
Ede Magyar

Ede Magyar (Ede Oszadszki) (Orosháza, 31 January 1877 – Szeged, 5 May 1912) was an architect, nicknamed 'the Hungarian Gaudi' for his similar organic style.

== Life and career ==
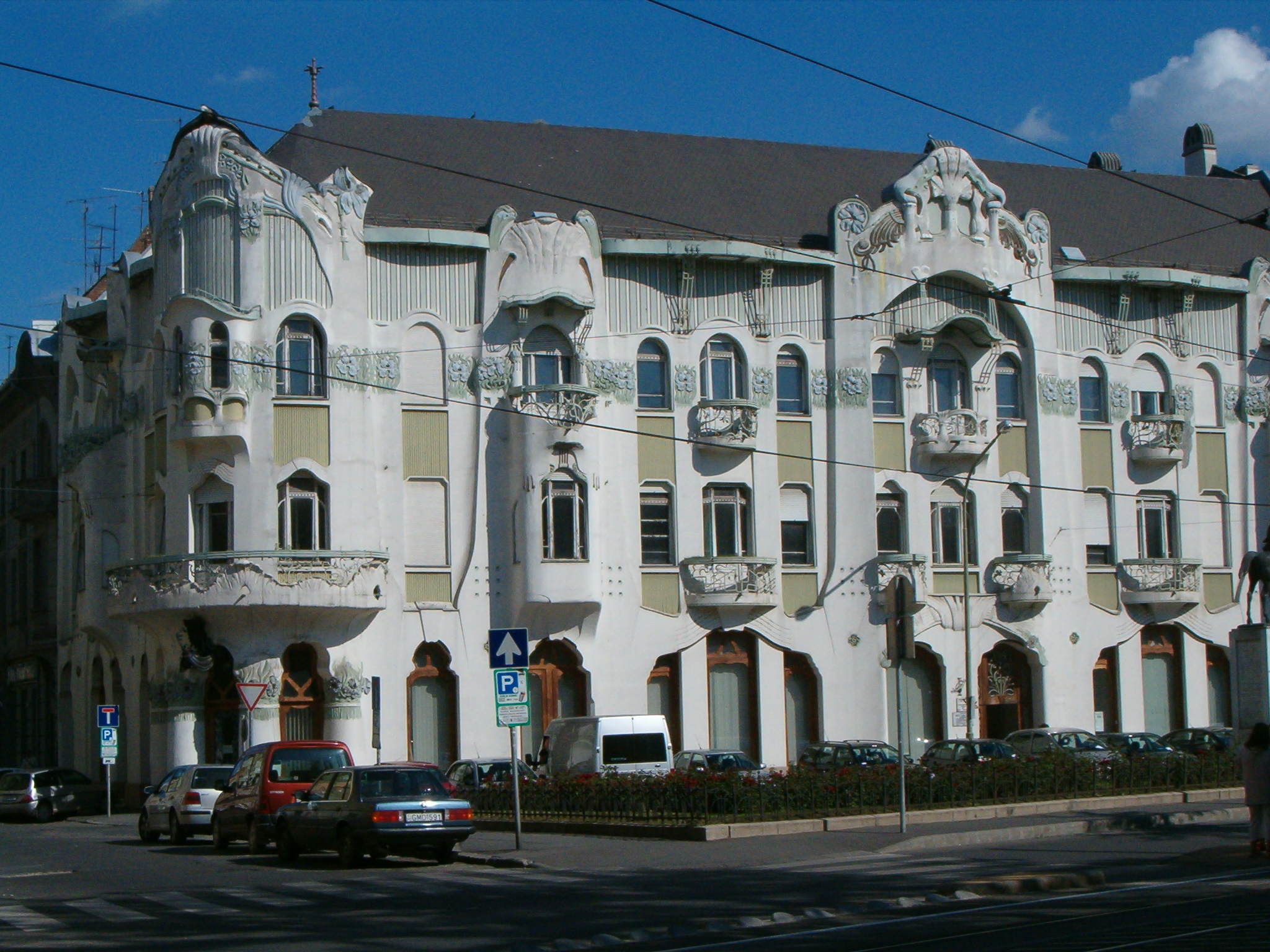
Reök Palace in Szeged by Ede Magyar

The son of Mihály Oszadszki, a cabinet maker, Magyar was three years old when the family changed its name. He became a master builder after studying in Budapest in 1901, and completed further studies abroad. His short but notable career focused on Szeged where he designed the Reök Palace (1907) and numerous other organic buildings. He was only 35 when he committed suicide following disappointment in love. He was buried in Dugonics cemetery where there is a permanent memorial to him tended by the city council since 2004.

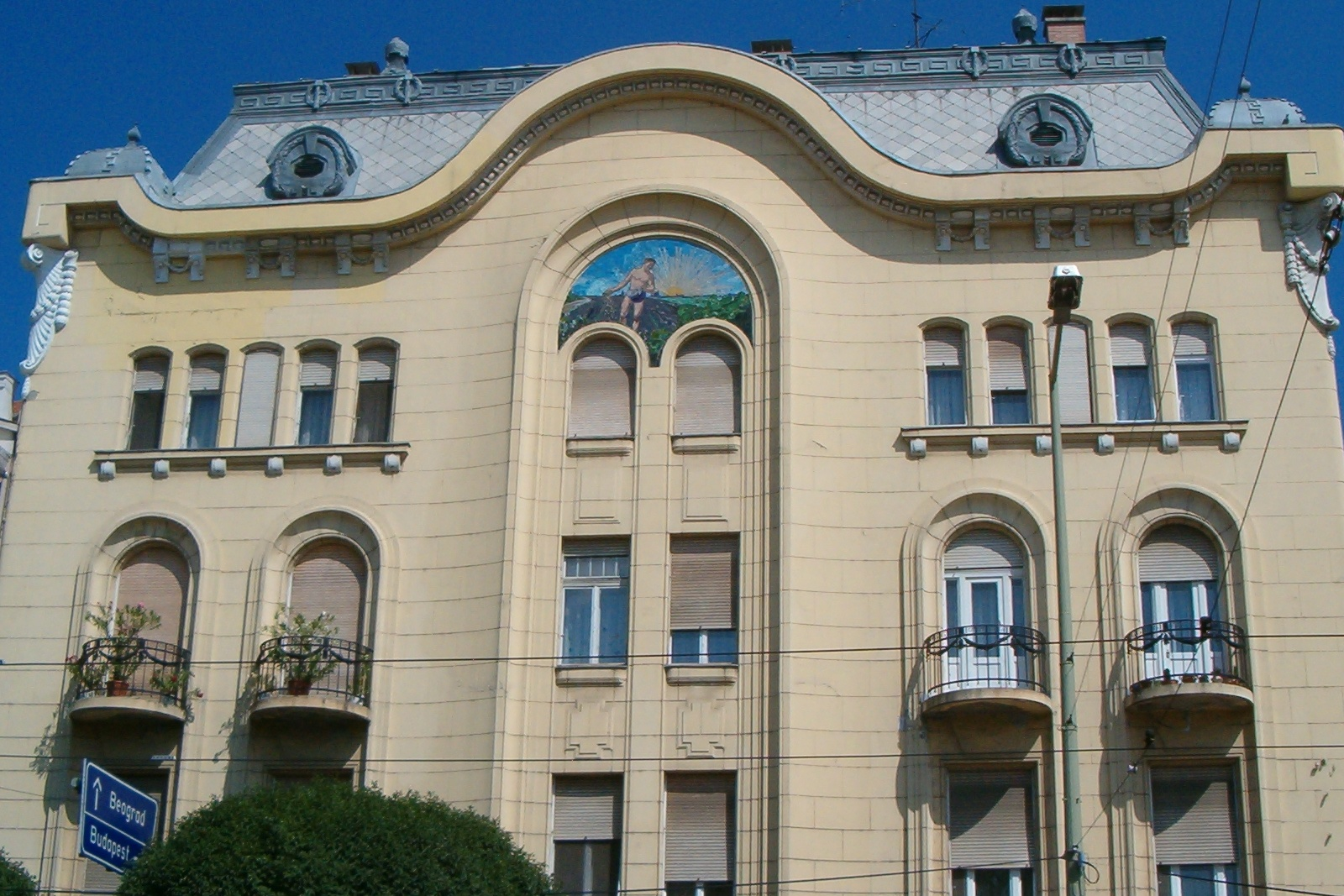
Szeged Reformed Palace

== Works ==
- Szeged: Burghardt House (Cafe Wien); Schaffer House (1904); Reök Palace (1907); Unger-Mayer House (1911), Reformed Palace
- Zenta: Rottmann House (1910); Royal Hotel (1911)
- Kaposvár Theatre (1911) with József Stahl
- Hódmezővásárhely: Simon Palace (1910)
- Gergely Csiky Theatre (1911) with József Stahl
