= Our Lady of the Assumption Cathedral, Kaposvár =

Coordinates: 46.3564°N 17.7877°E

Our Lady of the Assumption Cathedral
- Nagyboldogasszony székesegyház
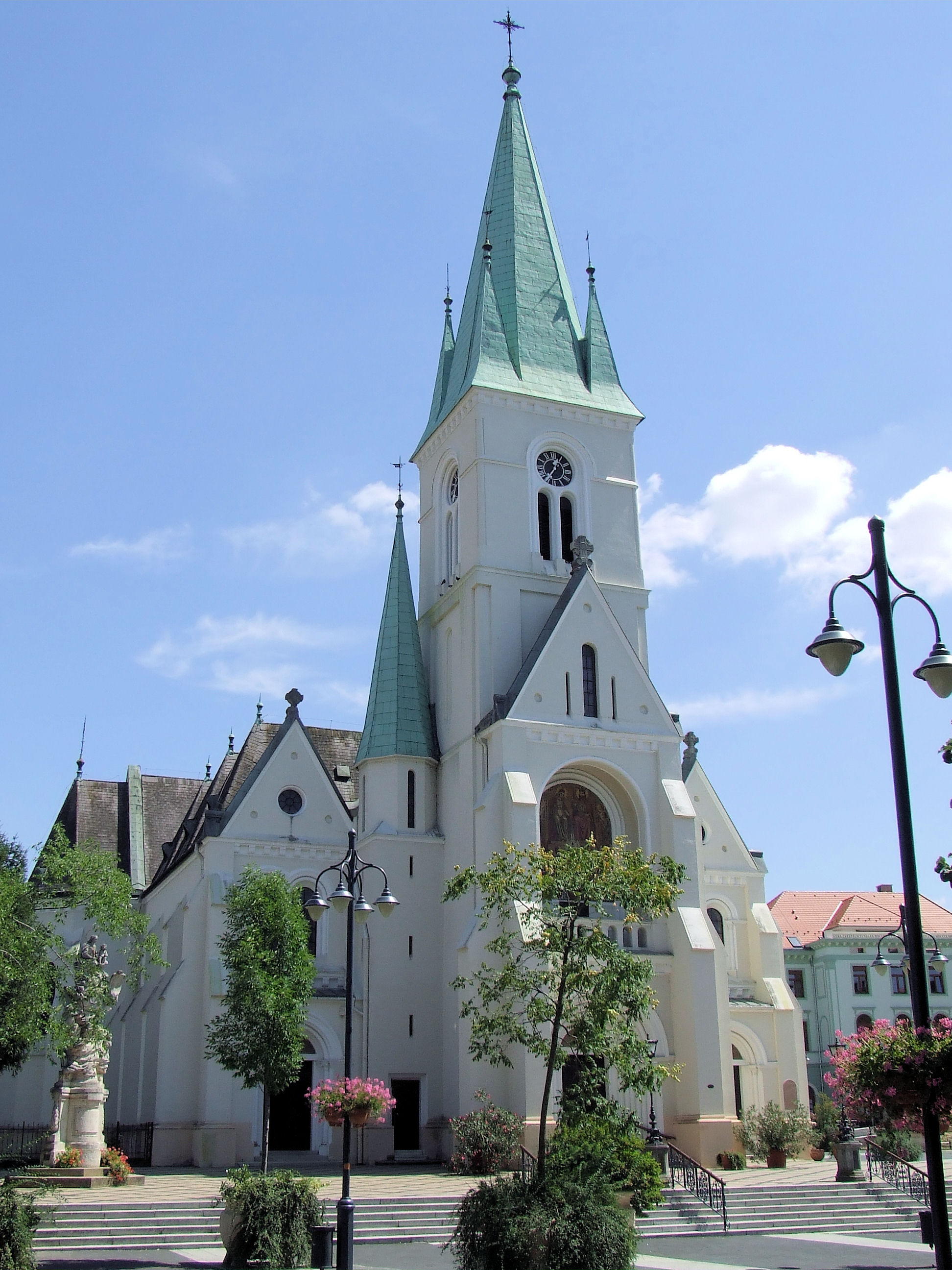
- Our Lady of the Assumption Cathedral
- Location: Kaposvár
- Country: Hungary
- Denomination: Roman Catholic Church

The Our Lady of the Assumption Cathedral (Hungarian: Nagyboldogasszony székesegyház) also called Kaposvár Cathedral It is located in the historic center of Kaposvár, is a religious building affiliated with the Catholic Church which is one of the largest Christian churches in Hungary, serves as the seat of the diocese of Kaposvár. Its construction began in 1885 and was completed in 1886.

The first church was built in 1737–1744 in the Baroque style. The new neo-Romanesque cathedral was completed in 1886, after a year of work. In 1937 an image on the porch, which is representing the pastor, residents and mayor professing his faith in Christ and the veneration of the Virgin Mary in Hungary was placed. In 1958, the church received a new organ and in 1969 underwent a complete renovation. In 1977, its inside was modified to allow the proper functioning of liturgical activities. In 2003 he was placed on the western wall plate red marble memorial priests who have served in the cathedral.

== See also ==
- Roman Catholicism in Hungary
- List of cathedrals in Hungary
- Our Lady of the Assumption

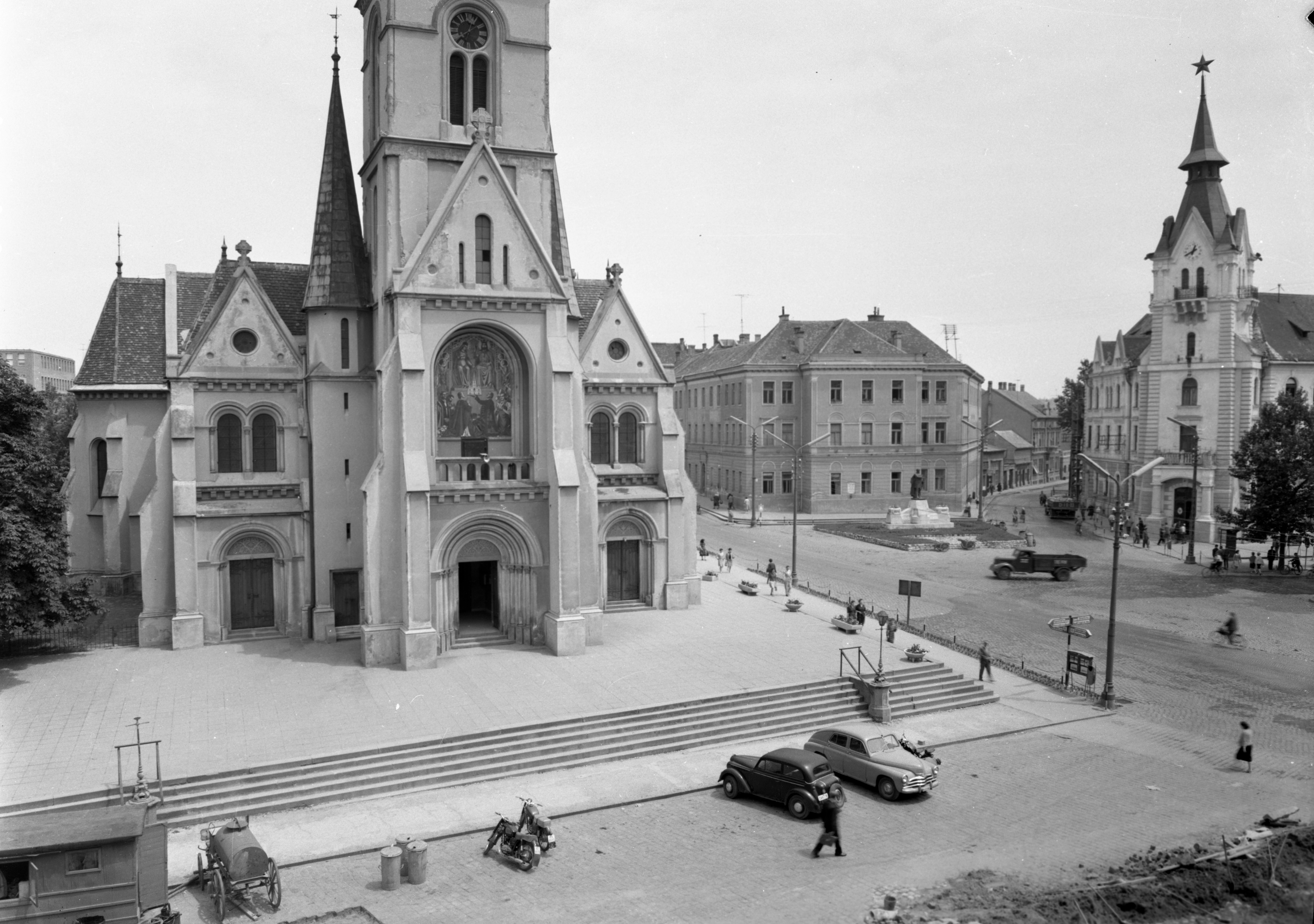
The church in 1962
