= Gergely Csiky Theatre =

Theatre in Kaposvár, Hungary

Csiky Gergely Színház
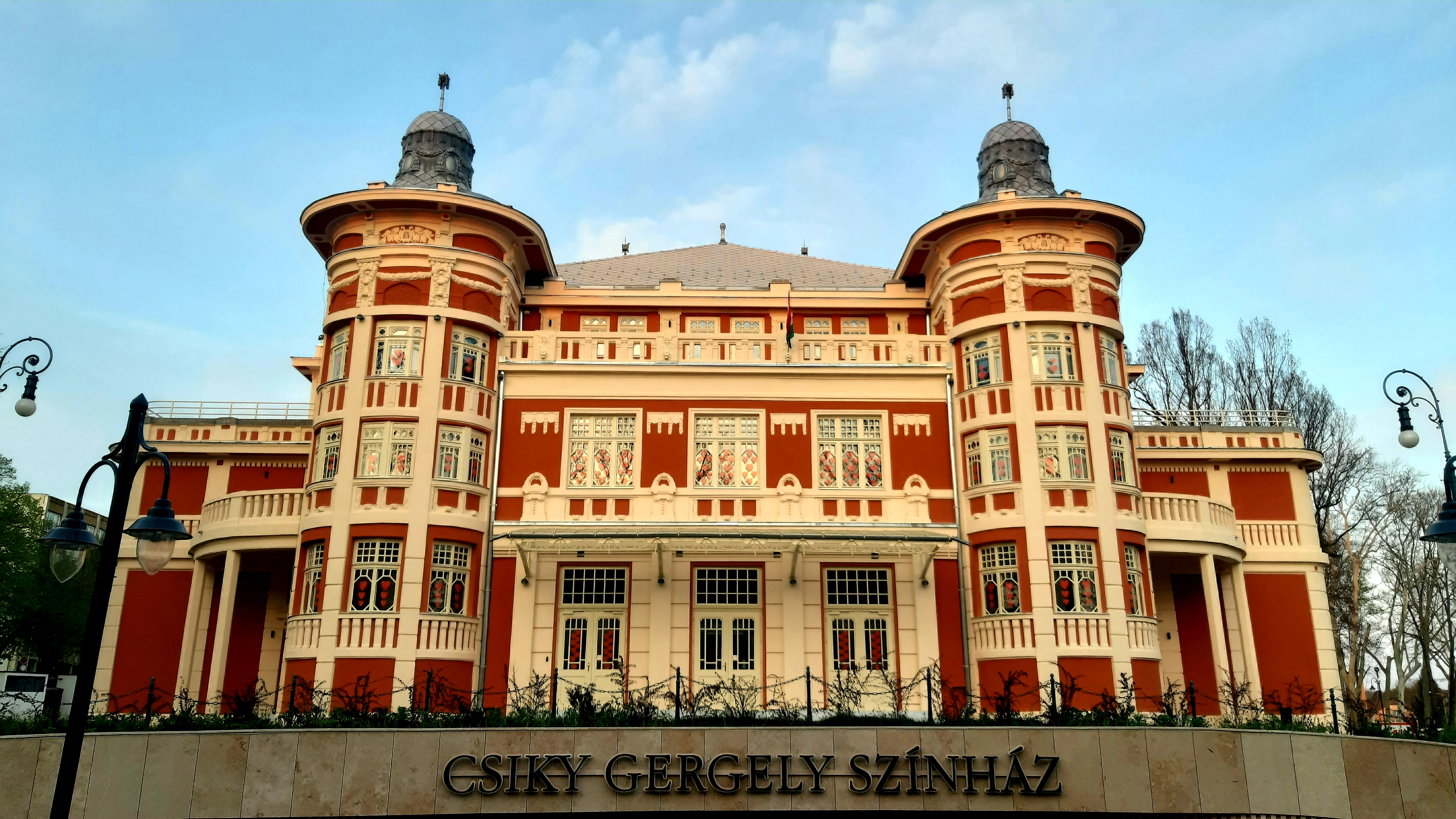
- Interactive map of Csiky Gergely Színház
- Address: Rákóczi square
- Location: Kaposvár, Somogy county, Hungary
- Coordinates: 46°21′13.92″N 17°47′44.89″E
- Capacity: 860
- Type: Theatre

Construction
- Built: 1911
- Opened: 1911

Website
- Csiky Gergely Színház

The Gergely Csiky Theatre is a theatre in Kaposvár, Hungary. Opening in 1911, the theatre became a major cultural center in Somogy County, with its company achieving their greatest successes between 1970–1985.

== The building ==
Designed by the well-known Ede Magyar and József Stahl, and named after 19th century dramatist Gregor Csiky, the theatre was opened in 1911 in the former Búza square of Kaposvár, as the city's first theatre. With its unique semi-cylindrical sides and distinct roofing it is regarded as an outstanding architectural achievement of its time. It was originally planned with a capacity of 1400, but with modifications, this number shrank to 860. Despite this, the theatre is one of the major such institutions in the country. The structure was Hungary's first to utilize ferro-concrete roofing. It saw two major renovations, first in the fifties, extending the stage area, and another during the eighties, this time fully renewing the building, and upgrading its technical apparatus. The park surrounding the theatre is a favoured public place.

== The company ==
Premiering in 1911 with the operetta Cigánybáró, the company of the Csiky Gergely Theatre employed several outstanding actors, achieving the greatest success during the lead of István Komor, Gábor Zsámbéky, and later László Babarczy from the beginning of the 1970s. Several actors were asked to join the National Theatre of Budapest during its renewal in 1978, but many of them quit in 1982 to form the Katona József Theatre. After reassembling the cast under the lead of László Babarczy, the success continued, and the company won all three awards of the 1982 Belgrade International Theatre Festival with the play Marat halála. Notable actors who played in the company include Juli Básti, Eszter Csákányi, Gábor Máté, Róbert Koltai, János Kulka, and Judit Pogány.

== Sources ==
- Mihály, Gábor. A Kaposvár jelenség. Múzsák Közművelődési Kiadó: Budapest, 1984. ISBN 963-563-153-7
- Csiky Gergely Theatre in the Hungarian Theatrical Lexicon (György, Székely. Magyar Színházmuvészeti Lexikon. Budapest: Akadémiai Kiadó, 1994. ISBN 978-963-05-6635-3), freely available on mek.oszk.hu
