= Reök Palace =

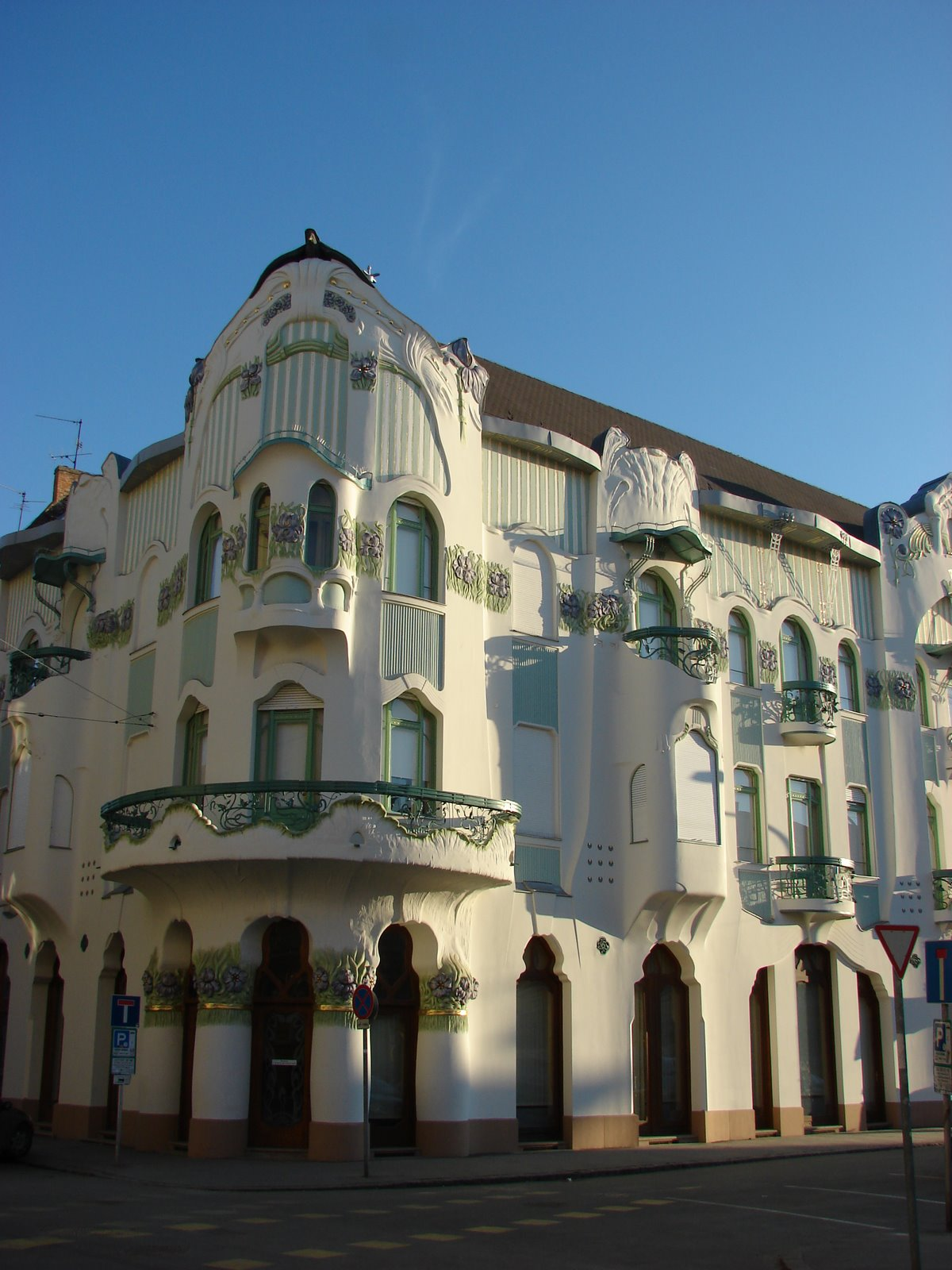
- Interactive map of the Reök Palace area

General information
- Architectural style: Art Nouveau
- Location: Szeged, Hungary, 6720, Magyar Ede tér 2.
- Year built: 1906-1907
- Inaugurated: 1960, 1974 2004-2007

Design and construction
- Architect: Magyar Ede
- Main contractor: Winkler és Társai

Website
- https://www.reok.hu

The Reök Palace (Hungarian: Reök-palota) is a prominent Art Nouveau building located in downtown Szeged, Hungary. Designed by architect Ede Magyar and completed in 1907, it currently functions as the Regional Arts Centre (REÖK), hosting rotating exhibitions of modern and contemporary fine arts.

== History and design ==
The palace was commissioned by Iván Reök, a prominent landowner, member of the Hungarian Parliament, and head of the regional River Engineering Office. Magyar's design was heavily influenced by his contemporary travels across Western Europe, particularly the works of the Belgian and, specifically the works of Victor Horta and Hector Guimard French Art Nouveau movements.

The building is situated at the intersection of Kölcsey utca and Feketesas utca (No. 56 Tisza Lajos körút). Its facade is characterized by fluid, organic forms and floral motifs, which are thought to symbolize the hydraulic engineering profession of its original owner. While originally constructed as a residential apartment house for the Reök family and private tenants, the interior has since been repurposed for public cultural use.
