= Lake Deseda =

Lake in Hungary

Deseda
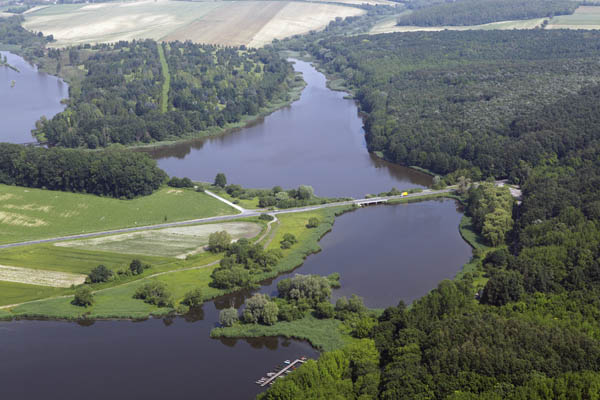
- Aerial photography

- Location within Hungary
- Coordinates: 46°24′23″N 17°48′53″E
- Basin countries: Hungary

Deseda is a lake located in Hungary.
