= Kaposvár =

- City with county rights
- Kaposvár Megyei Jogú Város
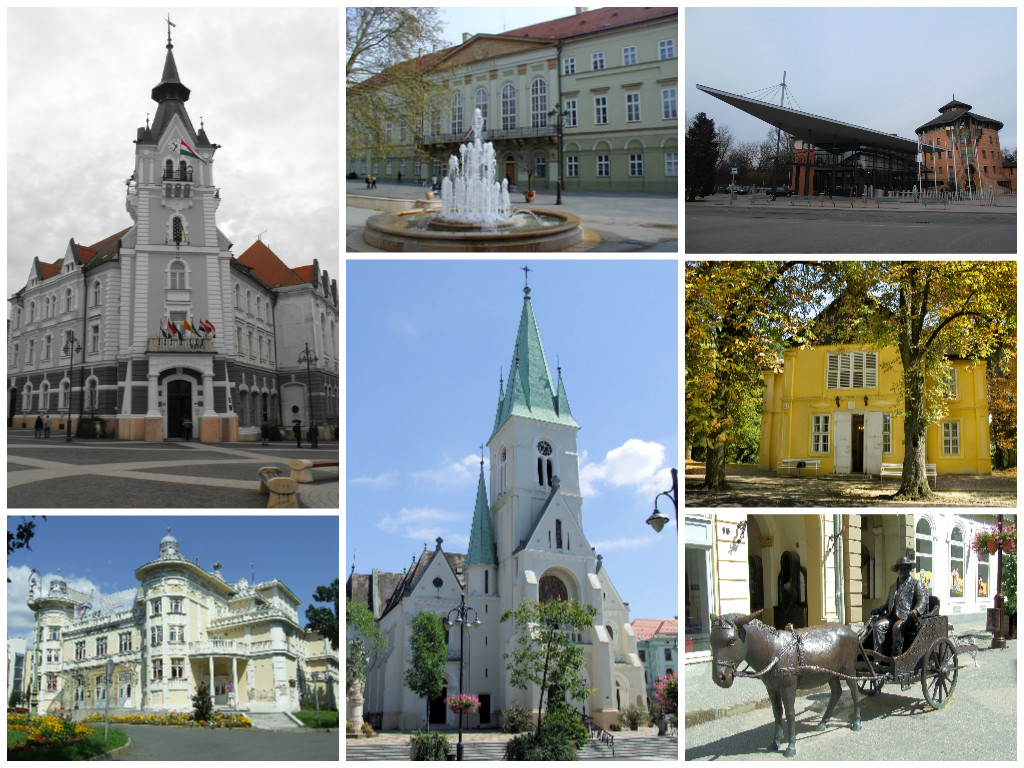
- From the left: City Hall of Kaposvár, County Hall of Somogy, University of Kaposvár, Gergely Csiky Theatre, Our Lady of the Assumption Cathedral, Rippl-Rónai Villa and the statue of József Rippl-Rónai

- Flag Coat of arms
- Nickname: City of Flowers
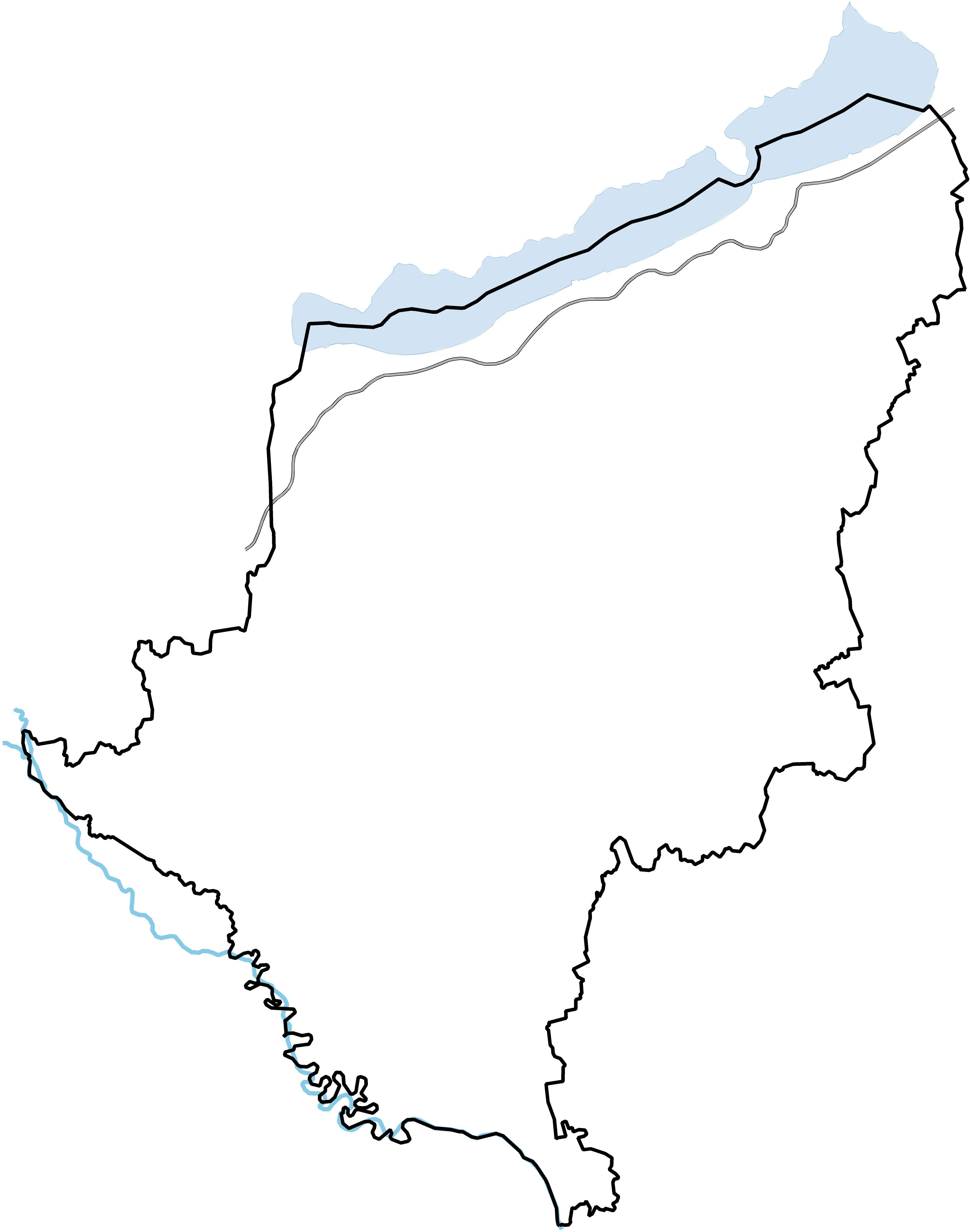
- Location within Somogy County Location within Hungary
- Coordinates: 46.36383°N 17.78225°E
- Country: Hungary
- Region: Southern Transdanubia
- County: Somogy
- District: Kaposvár
- RC Diocese: Kaposvár
- Established: 10th century AD
- Market town status: 1558

Government
  - Mayor: Károly Szita (Fidesz-KDNP)
  - Deputy Mayor: Zsombor Borhi; Lajosné Oláh; Tamás Dér
  - Town Notary: Dr Gábor Csillag

Area
  - City with county rights: 113.59 km^{2} (43.86 sq mi)
- Elevation: 153 m (502 ft)

Population (2017)
  - City with county rights: 64,280
  - Rank: 13th
  - Density: 565.89/km^{2} (1,465.6/sq mi)
  - Urban: 112,253
- Demonym: kaposvári

Population by ethnicity
  - Magyar: 85.6%
  - Romani: 2.2%
  - German: 1.1%
  - Croatian: 0.2%
  - Romanian: 0.1%
  - Armenian: 0.1%
  - Polish: 0.1%
  - Others: 1.2%

Population by religion
  - Roman Catholic: 44.7%
  - Greek Catholic: 0.2%
  - Calvinist: 5.4%
  - Lutheran: 1.5%
  - Jewish: 0.1%
  - Other: 1.5%
  - Non-religious: 18.1%
  - Unknown: 28.5%
- Time zone: UTC+1 (CET)
  - Summer (DST): UTC+2 (CEST)
- Postal code: 7400, 7451, 7461
- Area code: (+36) 82
- Patron Saint: Virgin Mary
- Motorways: M9 (planned); R67 (under construction)
- Distance from Budapest: 191 km (119 mi) Northeast
- Airport: Kaposújlak (non-public); Taszár Air Base (military)
- NUTS 3 code: HU232
- MP: Attila Gelencsér (Fidesz)
- Website: kaposvar.hu/en/

Kaposvár (Hungarian pronunciation: [ˈkɒpoʃvaːr]; also known by alternative names) is a city with county rights in southwestern Hungary, south of Lake Balaton. It is one of the leading cities of Transdanubia, the capital of Somogy County, and the seat of the Kaposvár District and the Diocese of Kaposvár.

== Etymology and names ==
The name Kaposvár is a compound of the name of the Kapos, a nearby river – which comes from the Hungarian word kapu (gate) – and the word vár (castle). Variants of the city's name include Ruppertsburg / Ruppertsberg / Kopisch (German), Kapoşvar (Turkish), Rupertgrad (Slovene), and Kapošvar (Croatian).

== Symbols ==
The shield of Kaposvár features a castle with a rounded arch port surmounted by three battlements with loopholes on a hill of green grass. The flag of Kaposvár consists of the coat of arms placed over a yellow background.

== Geography ==
Kaposvár is surrounded by the hills of the outer Somogy area around the Kapos river and the forests of Zselic. It lies 186 km (116 mi) southwest of Budapest.

Historically, Kaposvár was a crossroads for trade which arrived by the Kapos river. The river also posed a hazard to the river valley region, and flood defense mechanisms were constructed to reduce the threat. Today, the city is a growing junction for railways and other transportation, such as the European Railway line from Budapest towards the Mediterranean Sea.

=== Climate ===
Kaposvár's climate is classified as oceanic climate (Köppen Cfb) closely bordering on a humid subtropical climate (Köppen Cfa). Among them, the annual average temperature is 11.2 °C (52.2 °F), the hottest month in July is 21.8 °C (71.2 °F), and the coldest month is 0.6 °C (33.1 °F) in January. The annual precipitation is 664.7 millimetres (26.17 in), of which June is the wettest with 76.5 millimetres (3.01 in), while January is the driest with only 31.4 millimetres (1.24 in). The extreme temperature throughout the year ranged from −24.5 °C (−12.1 °F) on February 8, 2012, to 39.9 °C (103.8 °F) on July 20, 2007.

Climate data for Kaposvár, 1991−2020 normals
Month	Jan	Feb	Mar	Apr	May	Jun	Jul	Aug	Sep	Oct	Nov	Dec	Year
Record high °C (°F)	18.6 (65.5)	20.2 (68.4)	24.2 (75.6)	30.4 (86.7)	33.1 (91.6)	35.5 (95.9)	39.9 (103.8)	38.8 (101.8)	34.1 (93.4)	28.9 (84.0)	23.3 (73.9)	20.4 (68.7)	39.9 (103.8)
Mean daily maximum °C (°F)	4.2 (39.6)	7.0 (44.6)	12.3 (54.1)	18.0 (64.4)	22.5 (72.5)	26.2 (79.2)	28.5 (83.3)	28.1 (82.6)	22.6 (72.7)	17.1 (62.8)	10.5 (50.9)	4.9 (40.8)	16.8 (62.2)
Daily mean °C (°F)	0.6 (33.1)	2.2 (36.0)	6.4 (43.5)	11.5 (52.7)	16.1 (61.0)	19.9 (67.8)	21.8 (71.2)	21.2 (70.2)	16.1 (61.0)	11.1 (52.0)	6.1 (43.0)	1.5 (34.7)	11.2 (52.2)
Mean daily minimum °C (°F)	−2.8 (27.0)	−2.0 (28.4)	1.4 (34.5)	5.3 (41.5)	10.0 (50.0)	13.6 (56.5)	15.3 (59.5)	14.4 (57.9)	10.3 (50.5)	6.2 (43.2)	2.4 (36.3)	−1.7 (28.9)	6.0 (42.8)
Record low °C (°F)	−18.8 (−1.8)	−24.5 (−12.1)	−22.1 (−7.8)	−6.5 (20.3)	0.2 (32.4)	3.3 (37.9)	5.9 (42.6)	4.4 (39.9)	0.6 (33.1)	−9.1 (15.6)	−15.4 (4.3)	−23.9 (−11.0)	−24.5 (−12.1)
Average precipitation mm (inches)	31.4 (1.24)	37.5 (1.48)	34.5 (1.36)	43.1 (1.70)	67.7 (2.67)	76.5 (3.01)	74.4 (2.93)	67.1 (2.64)	71.0 (2.80)	62.6 (2.46)	54.2 (2.13)	47.7 (1.88)	664.7 (26.17)
Average precipitation days (≥ 1.0 mm)	5.6	6.4	6.2	6.9	9.1	8.3	7.7	6.5	7.6	6.5	7.3	7.4	85.5
Average relative humidity (%)	82.2	76.1	71.1	67.7	70.3	70.9	69.3	70.7	75.1	79.4	82.6	84.3	75.0
Source: NOAA

== History ==
=== Pre-Hungarian conquest ===
According to legend, the area of Kaposvár has been inhabited since around 5,000 BCE and the city itself was founded on seven hills. By around 400 BCE, Celtic tribes populated most of the area. From around 9 AD to 433 AD, it was a part of the Roman province of Pannonia. After the Roman withdrawal, tribes of Germans, Illyrians, and other groups inhabited the area. By 900 AD, there were Slavic and German villages in the area.

=== Middle Ages ===
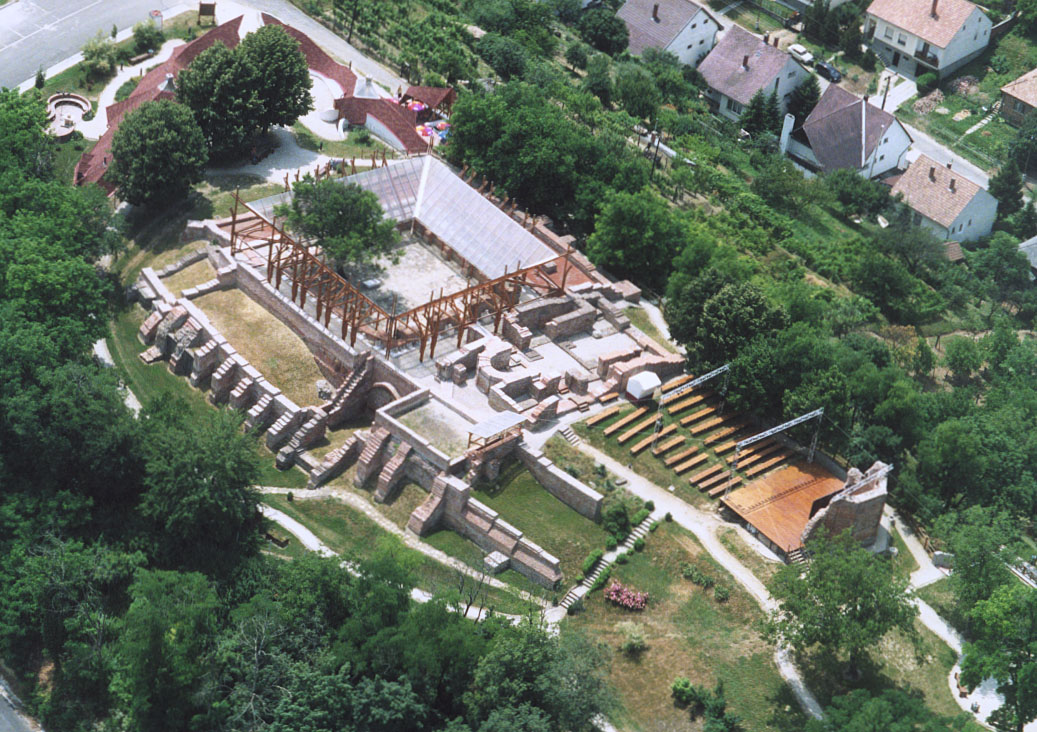
The Zselicszentjakab Abbey

The name of the settlement was first recorded in 1009 as Kapos in Saint Stephen's memorandum of association, which established the borders of the Roman Catholic Diocese of Pécs. In 1061, Atha, the lord lieutenant of Somogy, founded a Benedictine monastery in the settlement. The first castle in Kapos was built in the 1200s by King Béla IV in response to the Mongol invasion of Hungary.

=== Ottoman Rule ===
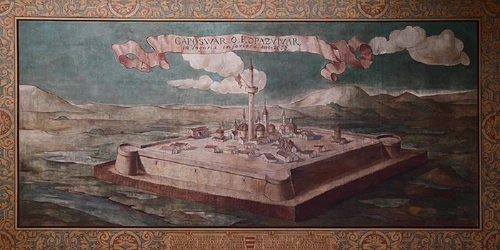
In Ottoman time Kaposvár

In the decades after the Battle of Mohács, Ottoman troops of Suleiman occupied the area, capturing the city's castle in September 1555 after a five-day siege. The Ottomans occupied the city for 131 years, using it as a military camp and small administrative center. In 1686, Habsburg troops reconquered the castle, city, and its surrounding area from the Ottomans.

=== Habsburg Rule ===
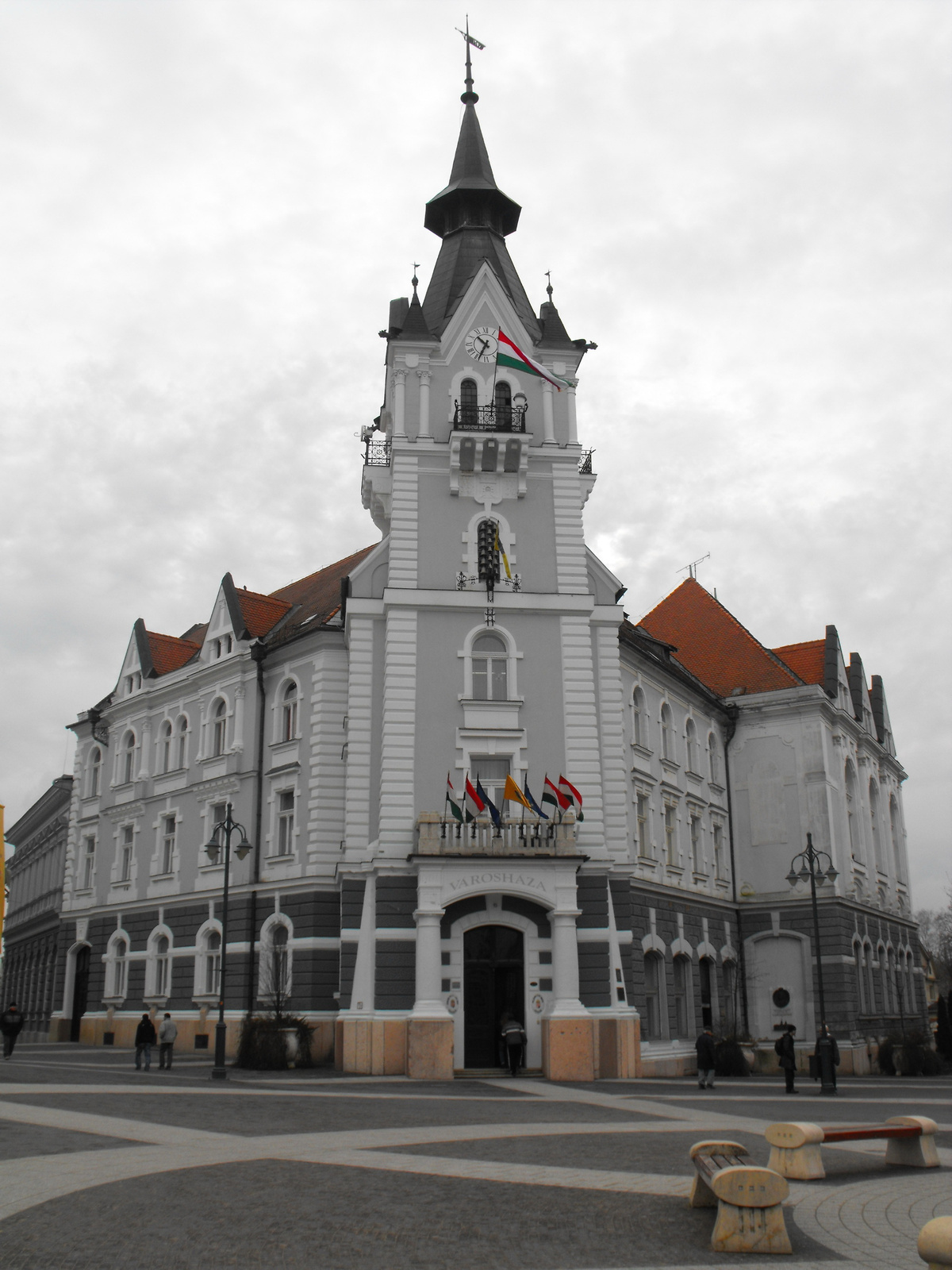
The City Hall of Kaposvár

At the beginning of the 18th century, the city entered into a period of decline. The castle of Kapos was razed by the Habsburgs in 1702, and the remaining structures were destroyed in Rákóczi's War of Independence.

The Esterházy family was responsible in part for the reconstruction and resettlement of the city. Kaposvár gained the right to hold markets in 1703, the first school was built in 1715, and a new church was built in 1748. In 1749, it was designated as the county seat and since then it has been the chief town of its county. Between 1710 and 1780, the population of the city doubled.

In the 1800s, Kaposvár developed into an industrial hub, in part because of its location on the railway line between Buda and Zagreb. Also during the 19th century, new medical and cultural institutions were founded in the city such as a pharmacy, general hospital, and county library. The city center also developed during this period, with the construction of the county hall and town hall.

=== Hungarian Revolution ===
The citizens of Kaposvár supported the Hungarian Revolution of 1848, and the city rose up against the Habsburgs. The city was initially occupied by the Habsburgs, but the insurrectionists eventually took control. The sheriff of Kaposvár, Gáspár Noszlopy, led a territorial army and took control of Somogy County for three months. However, the independence movement failed and the city again fell under foreign rule.

=== Austro-Hungarian Rule ===
Under Austro-Hungarian rule, Kaposvár continued to grow and develop. The Donner district was established on the south side of the Kapos river, and a newspaper and casino were established in 1866. In 1872, a rail line was finished which ran through the city, as opposed to previous lines which only reached its outskirts.

By the turn of the 20th century, numerous industrial companies were based in the city, including a large sugar factory and grain processing plant. The city shifted from agricultural production, and its urban area grew. The first planned city development was constructed while István Németh was mayor of the city from 1895 to 1911.

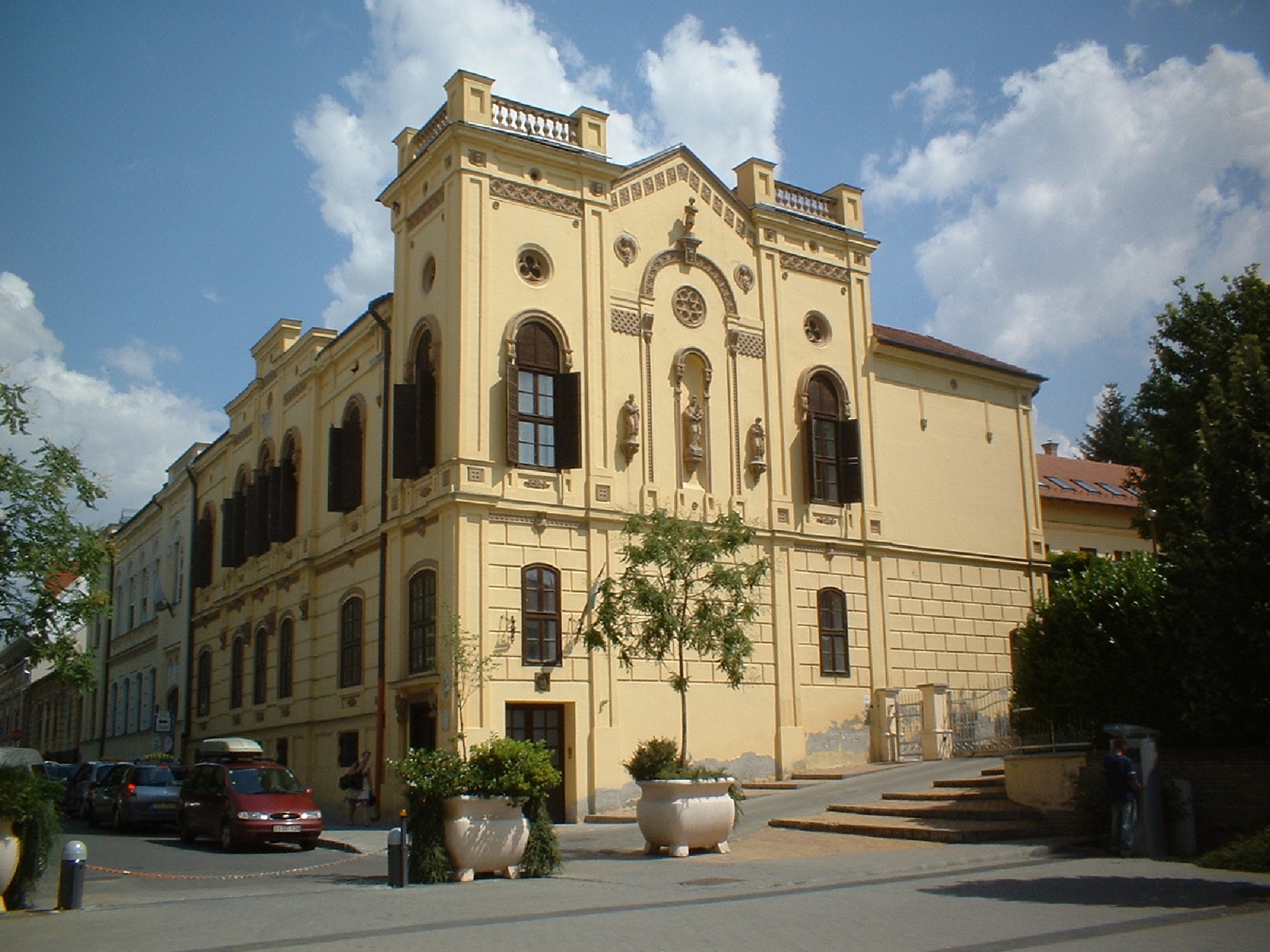
The Convent

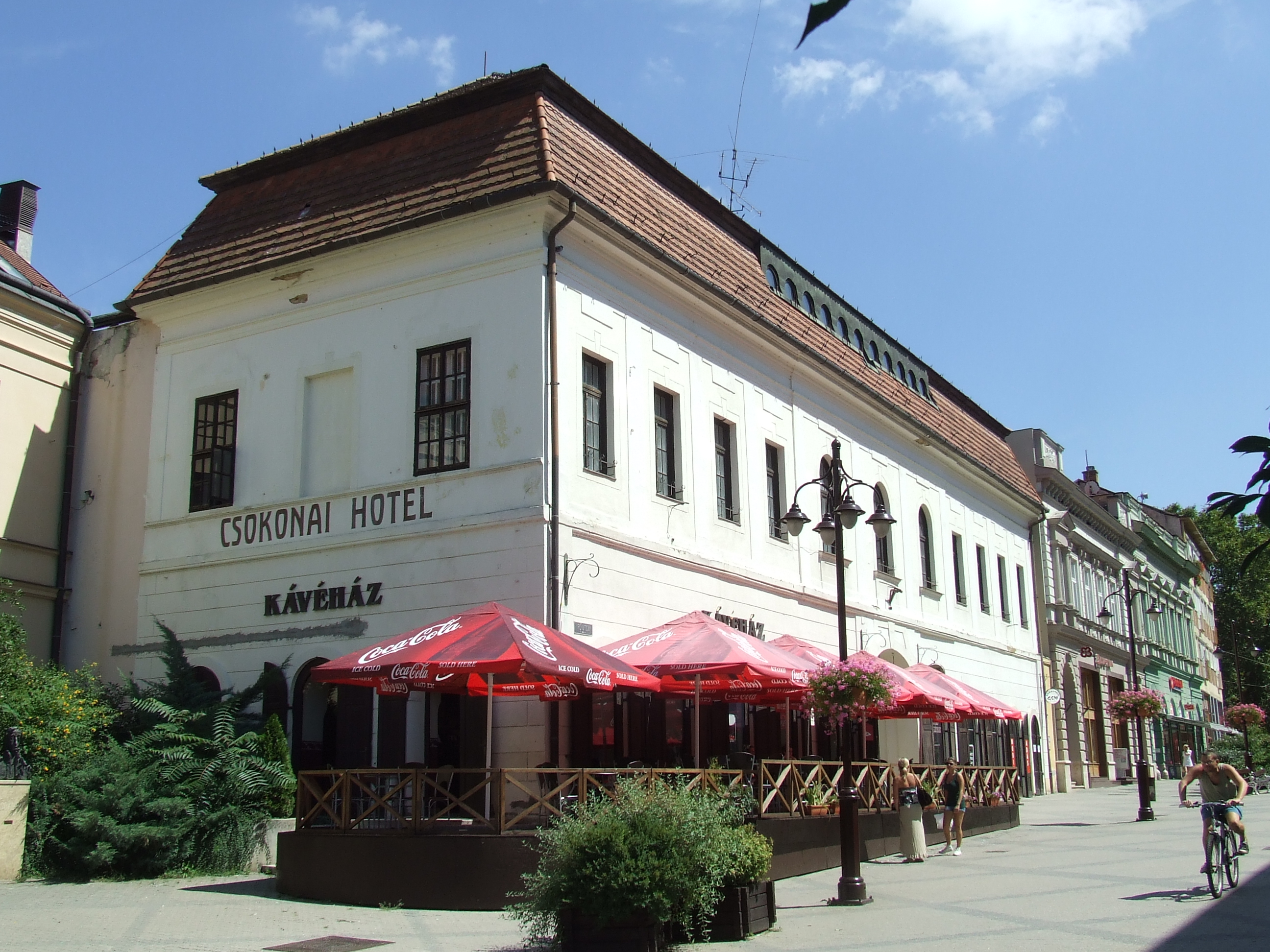
The Dorottya House (Csokonai Hotel)

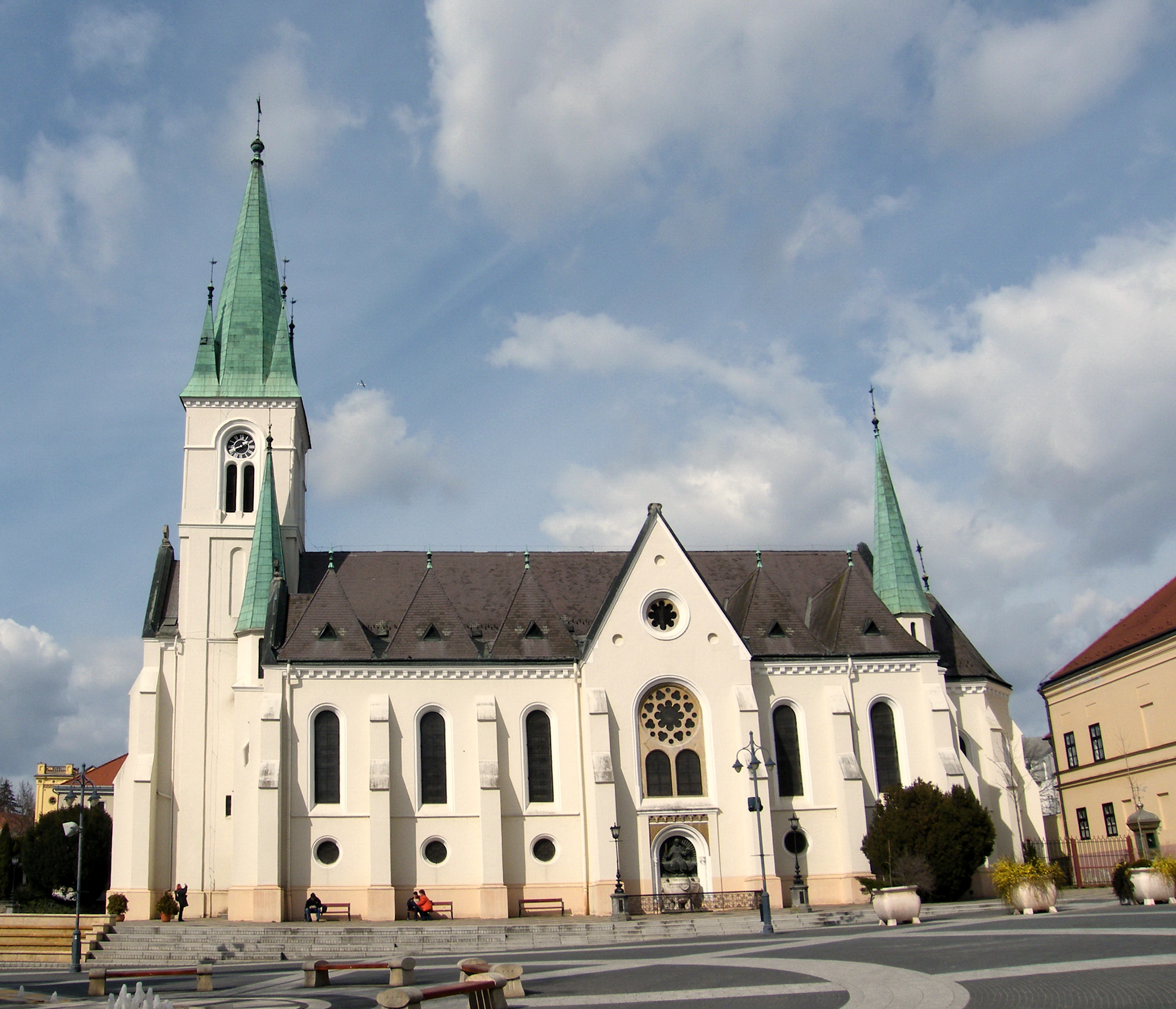
The Cathedral of Kaposvár

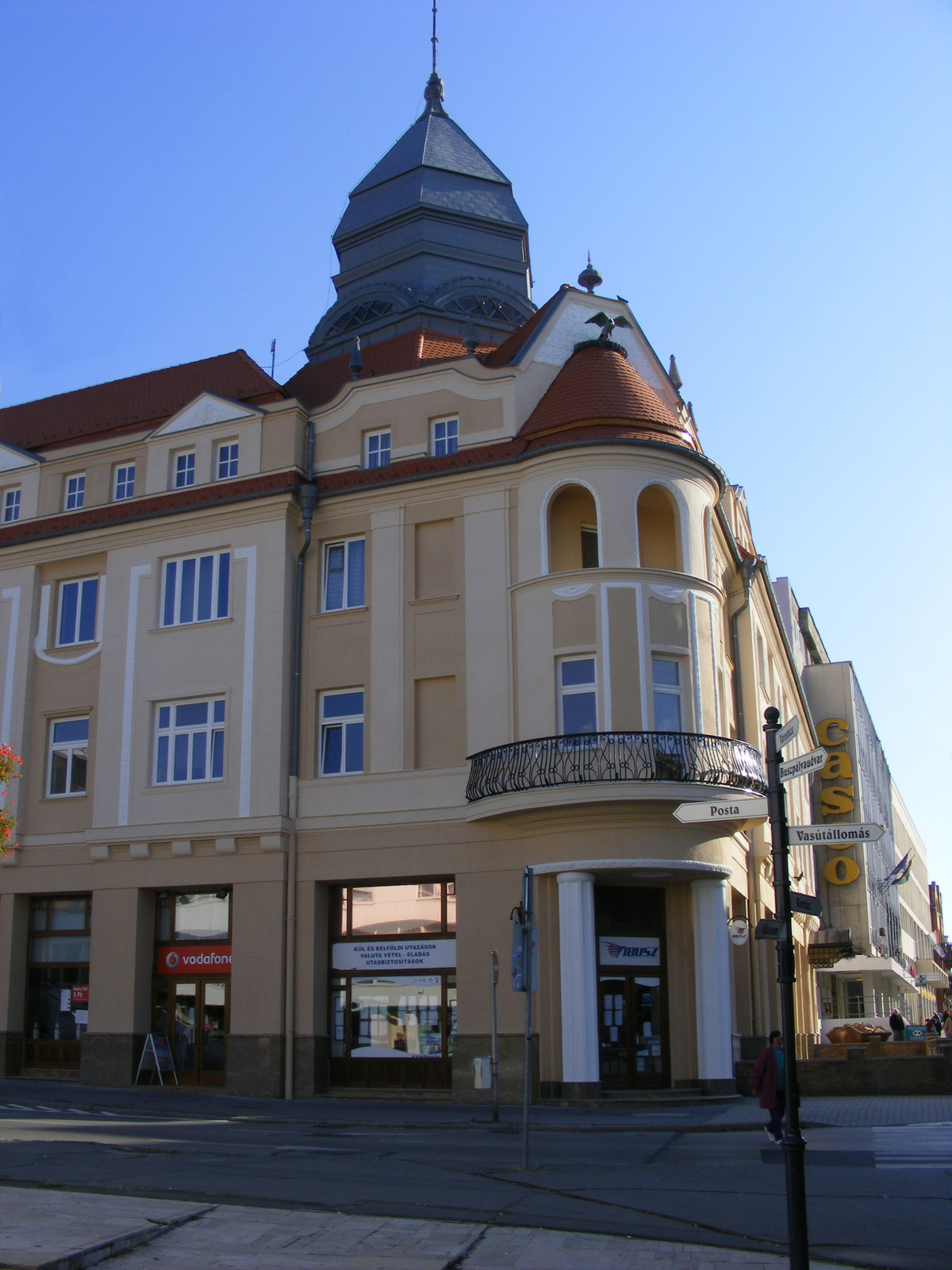
The Dorottya Hotel

The cultural portfolio of the city grew at this time as well. The Somogyi Hírlap, its first daily newspaper, was first issued in April 1904. In September 1911, a new theater opened, which was the largest and most modern theater in Hungary at the time. Additionally, film prospered in the city, and three cinemas were opened in the first decade of the 1900s.

=== 20th century ===
During World War I, Kaposvár experienced hardship, and strikes and left wing ideas gained traction in the city. During the period of Revolutions and interventions from 1918 to 1920, agricultural associations were formed and industrial plants were socialized. However, the revolution ultimately failed and the city again fell into recession.

In the 1930s, Kaposvár transitioned from an industrial city to a commercial and administrative center. When World War II reached the city, almost one thousand inhabitants were killed or disappeared. In March 1944, German soldiers entered the city and deported its Jewish population. In December 1944, Soviet troops captured the city.

After World War II, Kaposvár was able to recover quickly because the war did not cause much infrastructural destruction. New political parties formed, such as the Communist Party and Country Party. Under Communist rule, socialist industrialization commenced, with a new textile factory, meat plant, and electrical site. However, much of the small industry in the city disappeared. In 1956, Kaposvár joined the Hungarian revolution against the Soviets, but on November 4 Soviet tanks put down the insurrection in the city.

After the 1956 revolution, the city's administrative border grew, and it incorporated several neighboring municipalities including Kaposszentjakab in 1950, Kaposfüred and Toponár in 1970, and Töröcske in 1973.

== Tourism ==
Kaposvár is home to numerous tourist sites, including:

- Our Lady of the Assumption Cathedral
- Gergely Csiky Theatre – one of the biggest theatres in Hungary
- Ruins of Zselicszentjakab Abbey (Romanesque and Gothic)
- Rákóczi Stadion
- University of Kaposvár
- Lake Deseda

== Demographics ==
Historical population
Year	Pop.	±%
1850	4,638	—
1890	12,544	+170.5%
1900	18,630	+48.5%
1910	24,572	+31.9%
1920	30,096	+22.5%
1930	33,226	+10.4%
1941	33,515	+0.9%
1949	33,535	+0.1%
1960	43,428	+29.5%
1970	60,937	+40.3%
1980	72,374	+18.8%
1990	71,788	−0.8%
2001	68,697	−4.3%
2011	66,245	−3.6%
2022	59,260	−10.5%

Kaposvár is the most populous city in Somogy County and the second most populous city in Southern Transdanubia after Pécs.

The majority of its population is Hungarian (85.6%), according to the 2011 census. The largest minority ethnic group is the Roma (2.2%), the second largest are the Germans (1.1%) and third are the Croats (0.2%).

Religious affiliation of the citizens show a significant Roman Catholic (44.7%) and Greek Catholic (0.2%) and considerable Calvinist (5.4%) and Lutheran (1.5%) communities. 18.1% are non-religious.

== Economy ==
Kaposvár is still an industrial city and is home to companies such as the Austrian house construction company Wolf System, the Hungarian agricultural company KITE, Turkish textile producer Metyx, and the only sugar factory in the country Magyar Cukor Zrt.

== Politics ==
The current mayor of Kaposvár is Károly Szita (Fidesz-KDNP).

The local Municipal Assembly, elected at the 2019 local government elections, is made up of 18 members (1 Mayor, 12 Individual constituencies MEPs and 5 Compensation List MEPs) divided into these political parties and alliances:

Party	Seats	Current Municipal Assembly
Fidesz-KDNP	13	M
Opposition coalition (Note: Coalition of Kaposváriakért Egyesület-DK-Jobbik-LMP-Momentum-MSZP.)	4	
Winegrovers	1	

== Sports ==
Kaposvár is a "National City of Sport" in Hungary. The most popular sports in the city are football, volleyball, and basketball. The most popular sports team in the city is Kaposvári Rákóczi FC who play in the Stadion Kaposvár Rákóczi. Other notable teams are Kaposvári MTE Kaposvári Honvéd SE that played in the second and third divisions of the Hungarian league system.

== Twin Towns – Sister Cities ==
Kaposvár is twinned with:

- Bath, England, United Kingdom
- Cần Thơ, Vietnam
- Darkhan, Mongolia
- Glinde, Germany
- Koprivnica, Croatia
- Miercurea Ciuc, Romania
- Rauma, Finland
- Saint-Sébastien-sur-Loire, France
- Schio, Italy
- Tver, Russia
- Üsküdar, Turkey

=== Partnerships ===
Kaposvár also cooperates with:

- Cixi, China
- Mostar, Bosnia and Herzegovina
- Villach, Austria

== Gallery ==
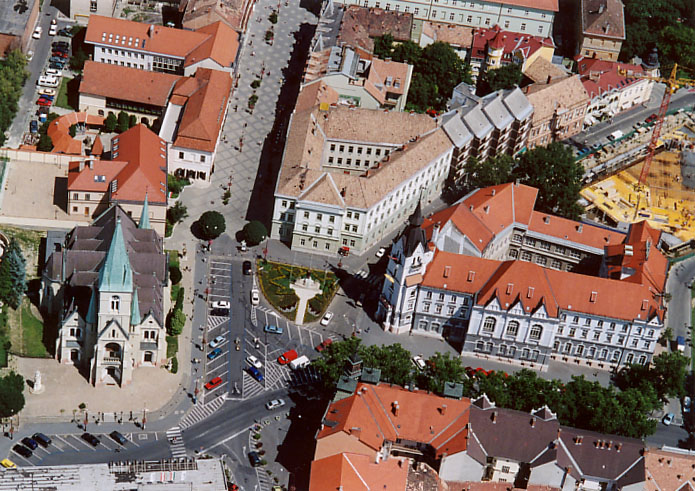
The city centre

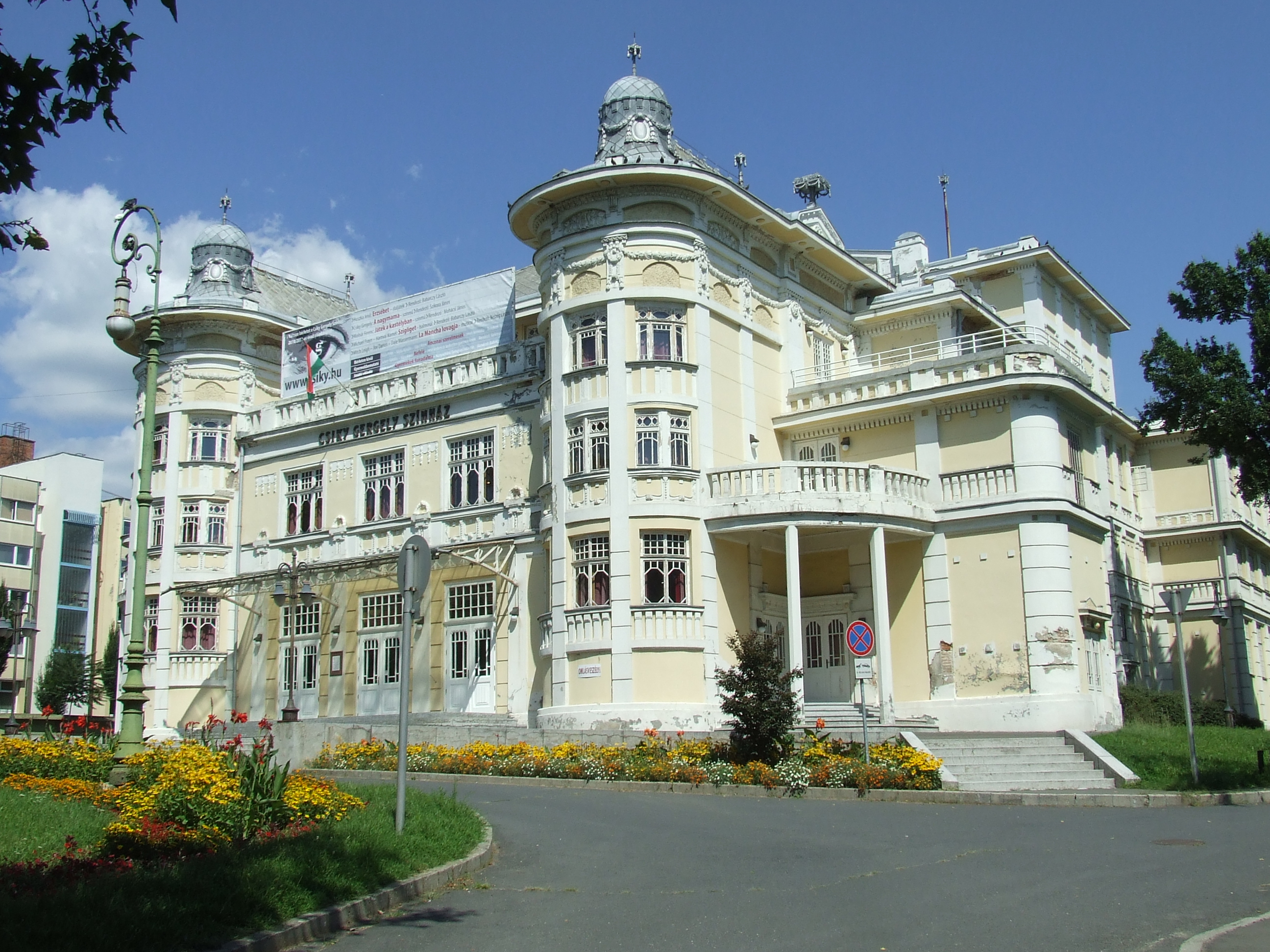
Gergely Csiky Theatre

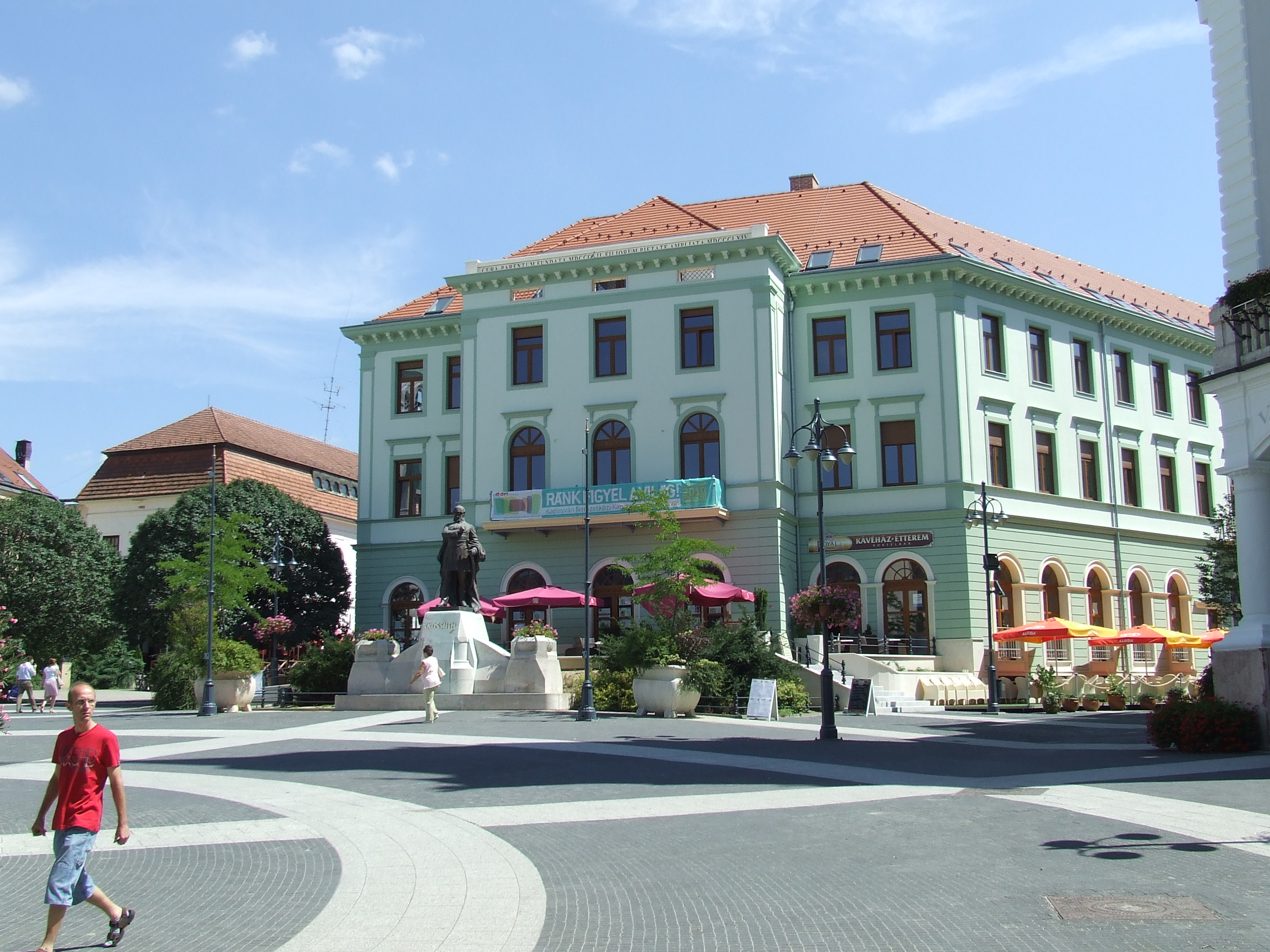
Palace of Finances of Kaposvár

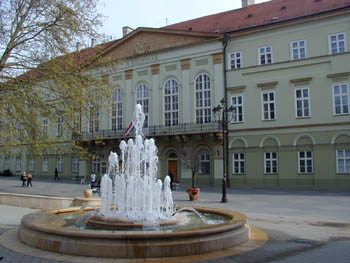
The County Hall of Somogy and the Rippl-Rónai Museum

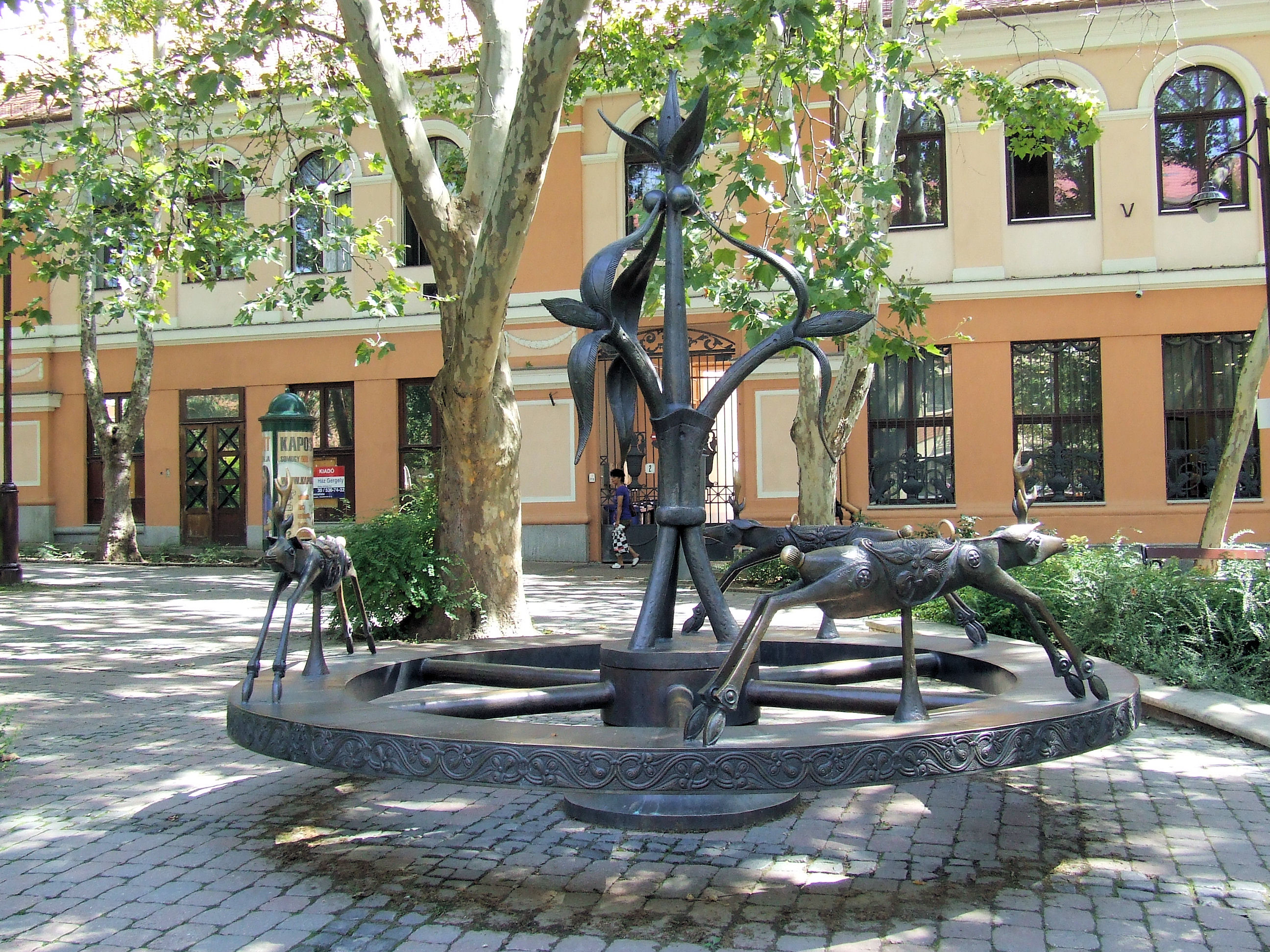
A statue in the city centre

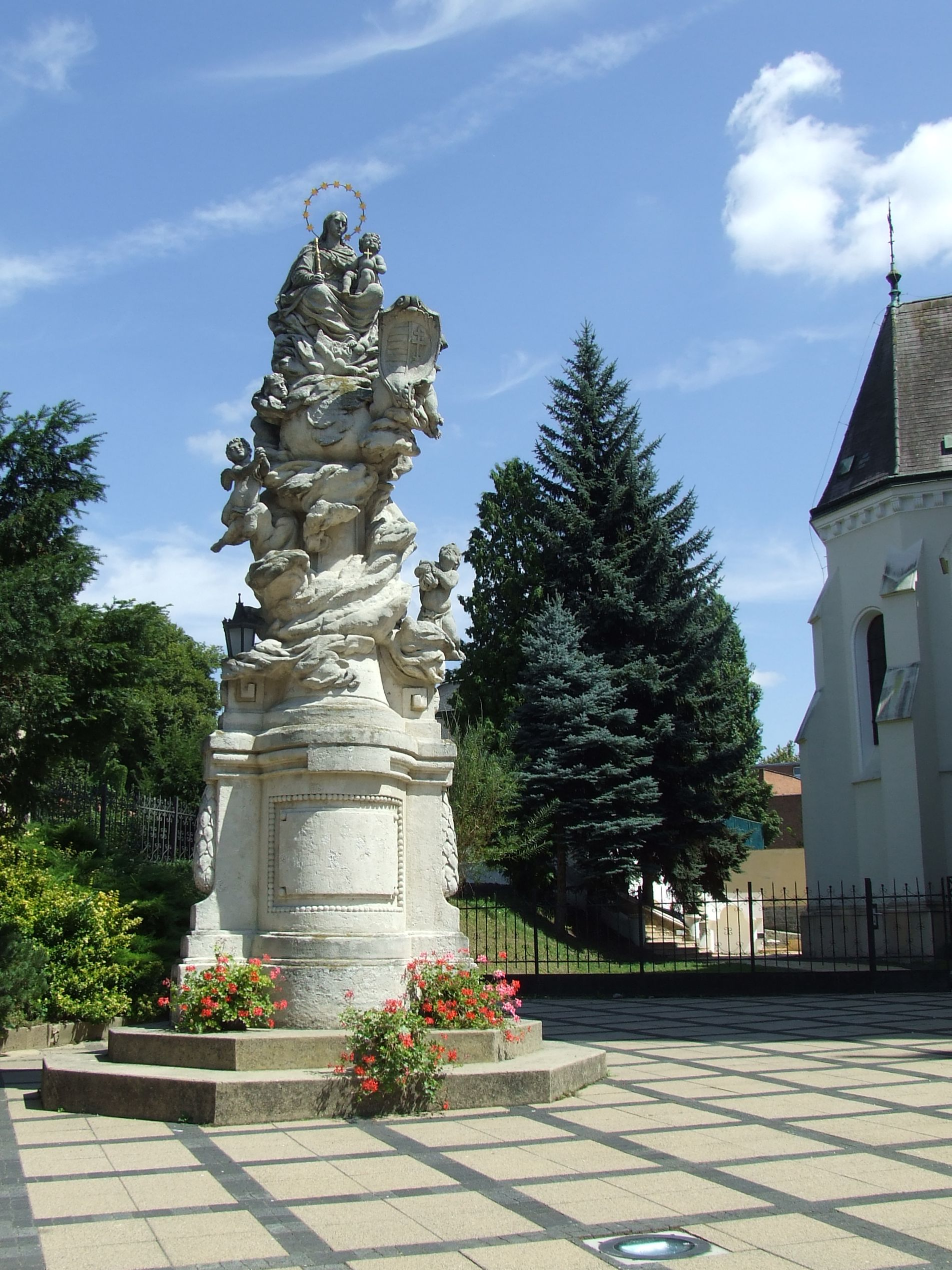
The Rococo Maria Column is one symbol of the city

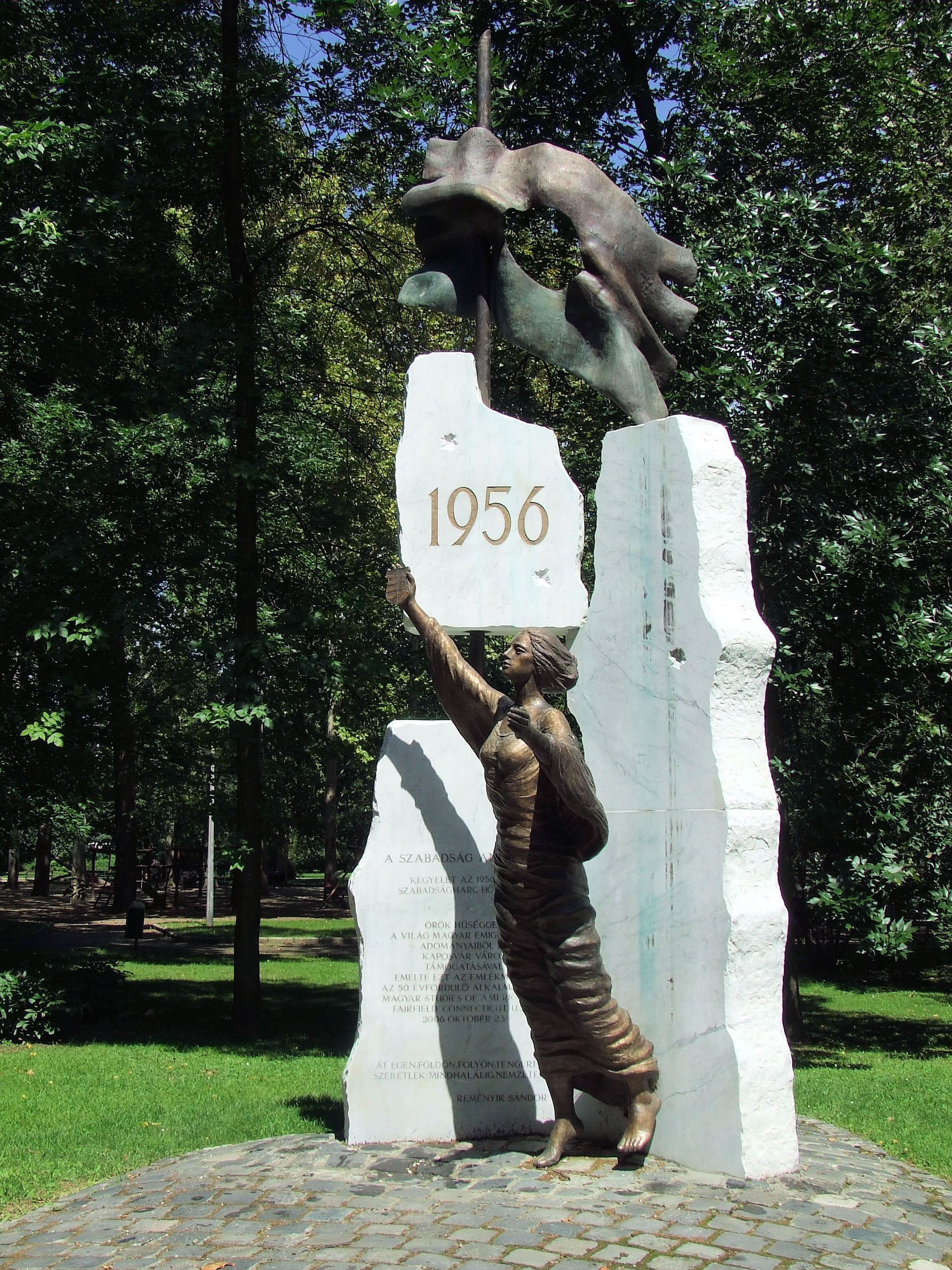
Monument of the Hungarian Revolution of 1956

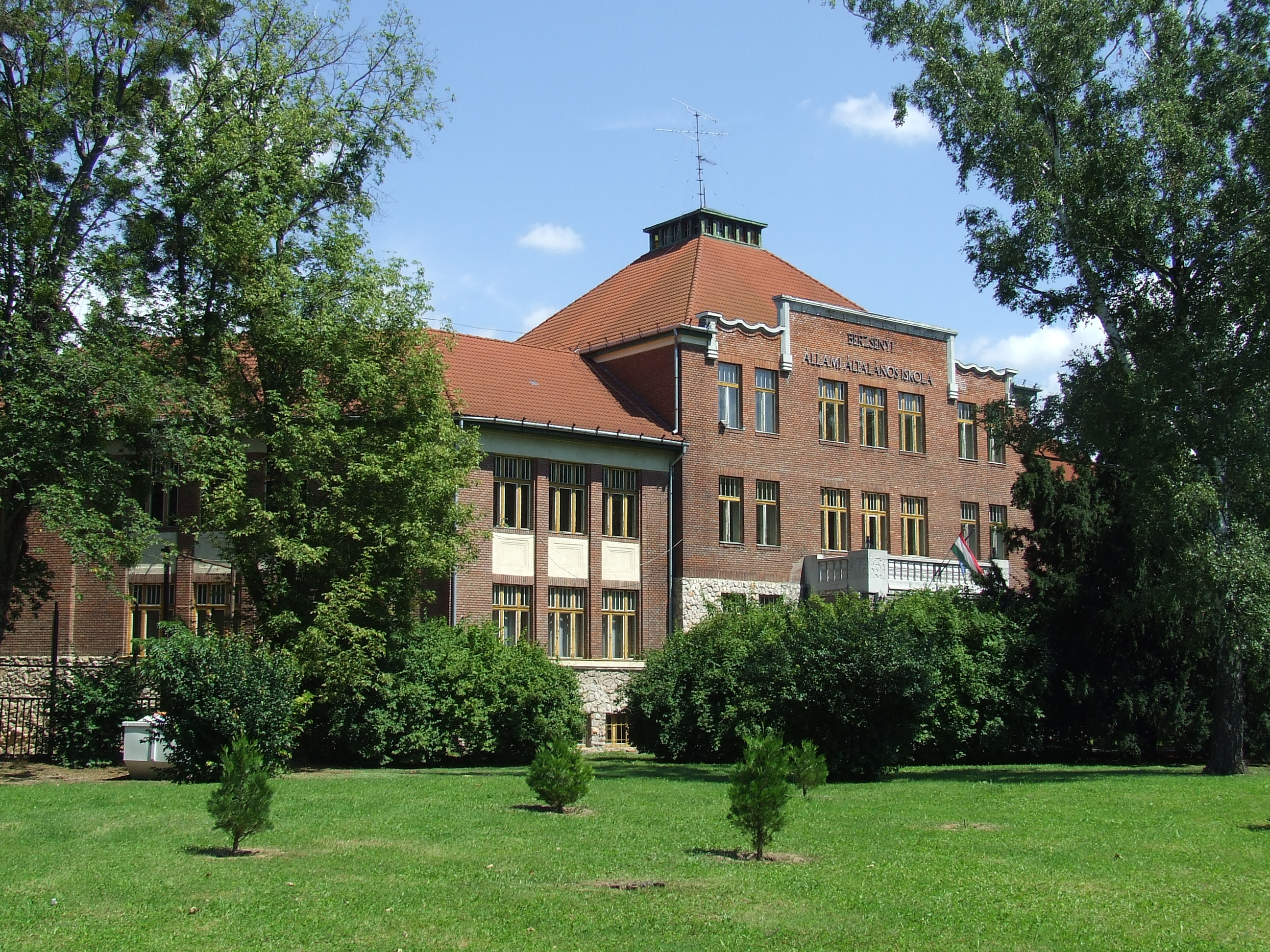
Dániel Berzsenyi Elementary School

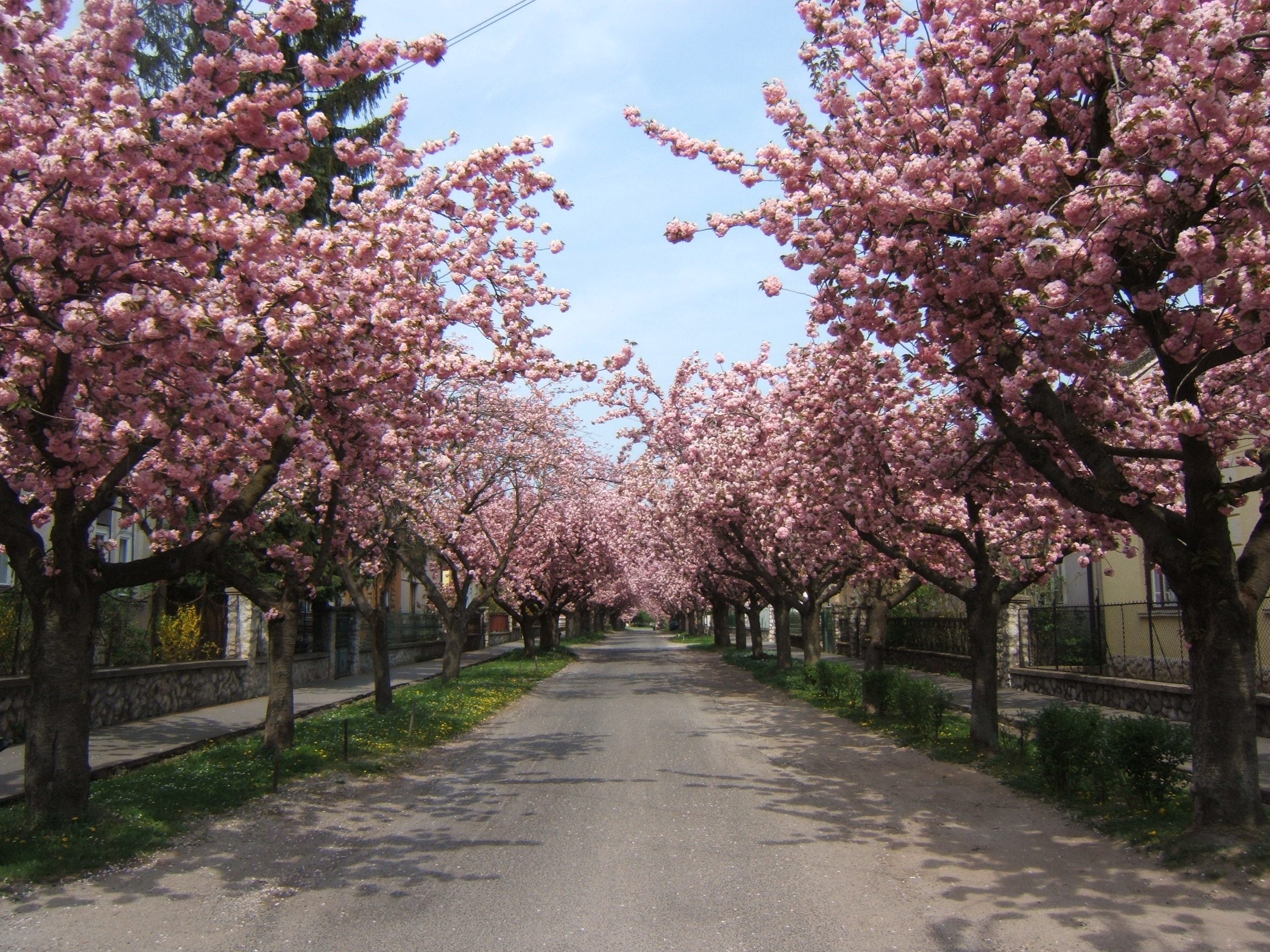
Temesvár street

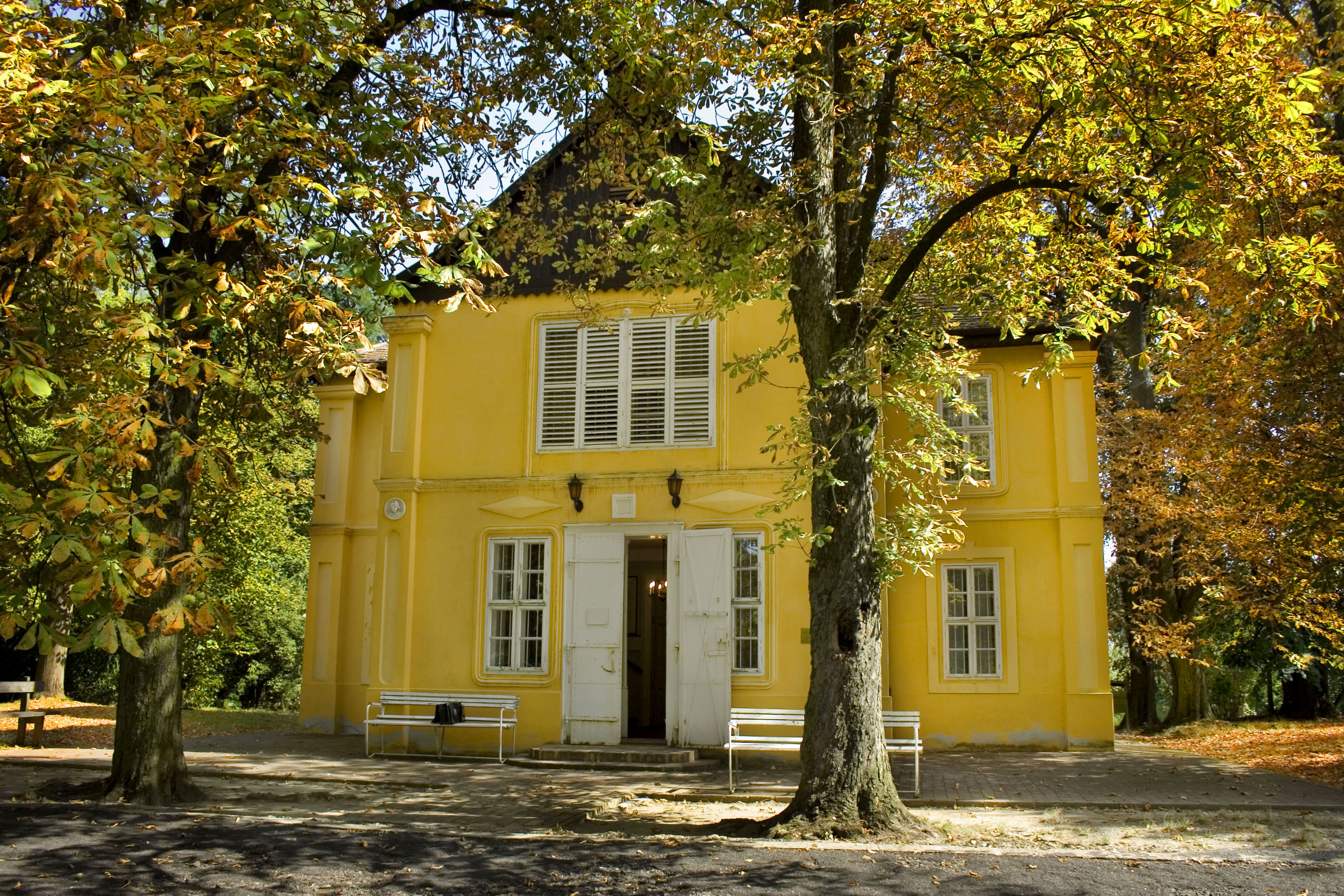
House of József Rippl-Rónai

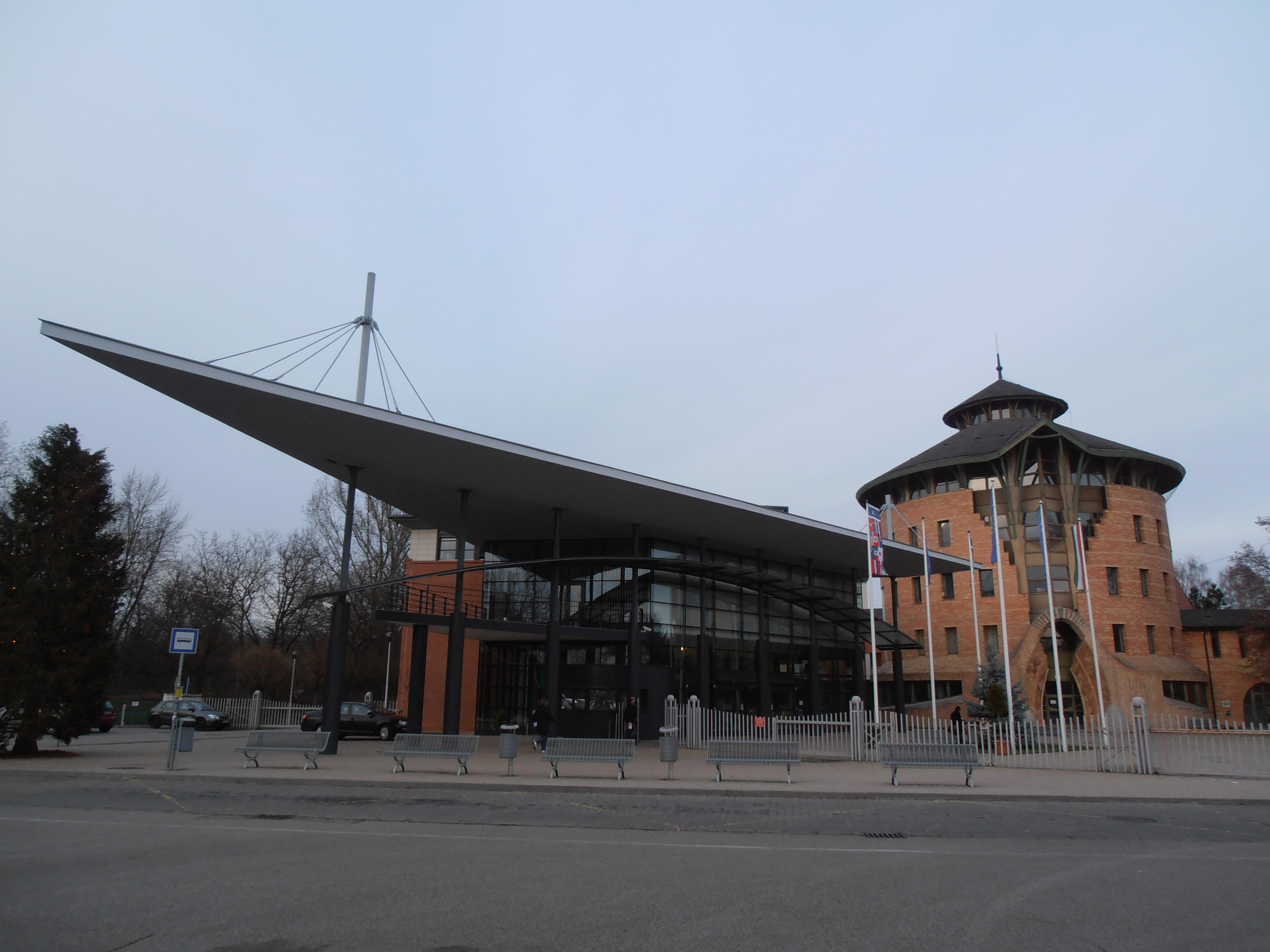
University of Kaposvár

== See also ==
- University of Kaposvár
- Diocese of Kaposvár
- Gergely Csiky Theatre
- Lake Deseda
