= University of Kaposvár =

Public university in Hungary

Coordinates: 46°23′06″N 17°49′34″E

- Kaposvári Egyetem
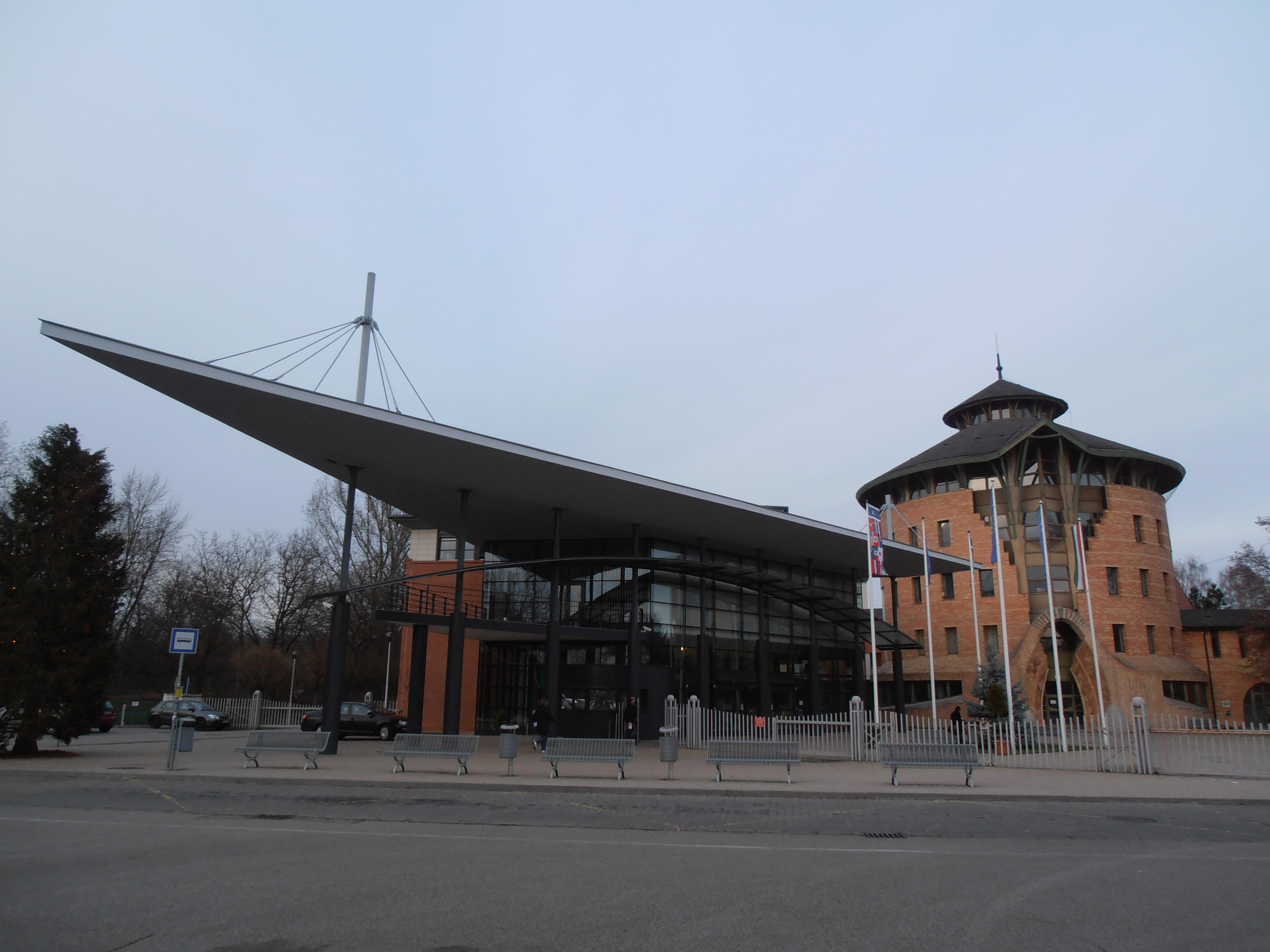
- Type: Public
- Established: 2000
- Rector: Prof. Ferenc Szávai
- Location: Kaposvár, Hungary
- Website: ke.hu

The University of Kaposvár (Hungarian: Kaposvári Egyetem) is a university in Kaposvár, Hungary. It was established in 2000. It offers undergraduate and postgraduate education. The Health Sciences Center and the Feed Crops Research Institute in Iregszemcse are parts of the University.

== Faculties ==
Its four faculties are:

- Faculty of Animal Science
- Faculty of Economic Sciences
- Faculty of Pedagogy
- Faculty of Arts
