= List of railway lines in Hungary =

Hungary railway map

This is a list of railway lines in Hungary.

== Broad gauge railways ==
The whole broad gauge railway network built after the second world war. In the Záhony transfer area made many organizer (rendező) and transfer (átrakó) station. The aim was to establish favorable relationships with the Soviet railway. It has served the Ukrainian-Hungarian freight traffic since 1991. The operators are the MÁV and the UZ.

Nr.	Operator	Start station	End station	Length (km)	Electrification	Current status
100FP	MÁV	Komoró	Eperjeske-Rendező	8.7	non-electrified	only cargo
100DM	MÁV/UZ	Eperjeske-Rendező	(Ukraine) Batyovo	19.0	non-electrified	only cargo
100FO	MÁV	Tuzsér	Záhony	7.8	non-electrified	only cargo
100DL	MÁV/UZ	Záhony	(Ukraine) Chop	7.7	non-electrified	only cargo
100FR	MÁV	Tuzsér wye (Záhony–Eperjeske-Rendező)		1.1	non-electrified	only cargo
100FQ	MÁV	Tornyospálca-Átrakó	Eperjeske-Rendező	9.2	non-electrified	only cargo

== Normal gauge railways ==
The present list not follow a perfect numeric and alphabetic row, but a logical geographical connection order. Each railway line is listed only once here. Same sections from the different lines (from the timetable) are not repeated. This principle is also valid for tramlines.

Nr.	Operator	Start station	End station	Length (km)	Electrification	Current status
1	MÁV	Budapest Keleti	Hegyeshalom	185.1	25 kV 50 Hz	active
1Q	MÁV	Felsőgalla	Tatabánya junction	1.5	non-electrified	last train: 9 June 2001
1T	MÁV/ŽSR	Komárom	(Slovakia) Komárno	9.6	25 kV 50 Hz	last train: 11 December 2004
303	MÁV	Gönyű	Győrszentiván	9.0	non-electrified	only cargo
1	GySEV/ŽSR	Hegyeshalom	(Slovakia) Bratislava-Petržalka	29.7	25 kV 50 Hz	active
1U	MÁV/ÖBB	Hegyeshalom	(Austria) Parndorf	22.9	15 kV 16.7 Hz	active
1AK	MÁV	Ferencváros	Rákospalota-Újpest	16.6	25 kV 50 Hz	active
1AL	MÁV	Ferencváros	Kőbánya-Kispest	5.3	25 kV 50 Hz	active
120J	MÁV	Józsefváros	Kőbánya felső	3.7	25 kV 50 Hz	last train: 10 December 2005
1AO	MÁV	Kőbánya-Hizlaló	Kőbánya felső	2.8	non-electrified	inactive
1AP	MÁV	Örs vezér tere	Kőbánya-Teher	2.1	non-electrified	connection line with H8
1AP	MÁV	Kőbánya-Teher	Kőbánya felső	1.3	25 kV 50 Hz	only cargo
1AR	MÁV	Kőbánya felső wye (Rákos–Rákosszentmihály)		1.4	25 kV 50 Hz	active
1AS	MÁV	Angyalföld junction	Angyalföld	2.0	25 kV 50 Hz	active
1AV	MÁV	Rákospalota-Újpest wye (Rákosszentmihály–Rákosrendező)		2.6	25 kV 50 Hz	last train: 3 November 2026
2	MÁV	Budapest Nyugati	Esztergom	53.2	25 kV 50 Hz	active
H5	MÁV	Budapest Batthyány tér	Szentendre	20.9	1100 V DC	active
H5A	MÁV	Margit híd	Komjádi junction	0.6	1100 V DC	last train: 4 August 2005
H5B	MÁV	Aquincum wye (Kaszásdűlő–Óbuda)		2.3	1100 V DC	last train: 4 August 2005
4	MÁV	Esztergom-Kertváros	Almásfüzitő	37.2	non-electrified	active
4K	MÁV	Esztergom wye (Dorog–Tokod)		3.0	non-electrified	only cargo
5	MÁV	Székesfehérvár	Komárom	81.9	non-electrified	active
5J	MÁV	Moha Rakodó	Kincsesbánya	3.6	non-electrified	last train: 31 December 1972
5K	MÁV	Bodajk	Balinka	9.1	non-electrified	last train: 31 December 1972
5L	MÁV	Mór	Pusztavám	11.8	non-electrified	last train: 30 September 1974, demolished between Mór and Mór-Sporttelep
6	MÁV	Bicske	Székesfehérvár	47.7	non-electrified	last train: 1 June 1980, demolished between Felcsút and Alcsút.
8	GySEV	Győr	Sopron	84.3	25 kV 50 Hz	active
8E	GySEV	Sopron	(Austria) Wulkaprodersdorf	16.8	25 kV 50 Hz	active
8G	GySEV	Győr West wye (Győr-GYSEV–Ikrény)		1.5	25 kV 50 Hz	only cargo
8GR	GySEV	Győr	Győr-GYSEV	2.2	25 kV 50 Hz	only cargo
8R	GySEV	Sopron wye (Fertőboz–Harka)		2.2	25 kV 50 Hz	only cargo
9	GySEV	Fertőszentmiklós	(Austria) Neusiedl am See	52.7	25 kV 50 Hz	active
10	MÁV	Győr	Győrszabadhegy	3.9	non-electrified	active
10	GySEV	Győrszabadhegy	Celldömölk	66.5	non-electrified	active
10K	MÁV	Győr East wye (Győrszentiván–Győrszabadhegy)		0.8	non-electrified	only cargo
10L	GySEV	Celldömölk wye (Külsővat–Celldömölk-Rendező)		1.3	non-electrified	last train: 25 August 2019
11	GySEV	Győrszabadhegy	Veszprém	73.3	non-electrified	active
11B	GySEV	Dudar mine	Zirc	9.0	non-electrified	only cargo
12	MÁV	Tatabánya	Oroszlány	15.0	25 kV 50 Hz	active
13	MÁV	Környe	Veszprémvarsány	58.0	non-electrified	last train: 3 March 2007
13	GySEV	Veszprémvarsány	Pápa	27.5	non-electrified	last train: 3 March 2007
14	GySEV	Pápa	Csorna	36.5	non-electrified	active
524	ÖBB/GySEV	(Austria) Wiener Neustadt Hauptbahnhof	Sopron	32.8	non-electrified	active
15	GySEV	Sopron	Szombathely	61.9	25 kV 50 Hz	active
15D	GySEV/ÖBB	Harka	(Austria) Deutschkreutz	4.6	25 kV 50 Hz	active
15D	ÖBB	(Austria) Deutschkreutz	(Austria) Oberloisdorf	37.3	non-electrified	Inactive. The last trains were the followings: Deutschkreutz–Neckenmarkt-Horitschon 30 June 2013, Neckenmarkt-Horitschon–Lackenbach 9 June 2001, Lackenbach–Oberpullendorf 28 May 1988 and Oberpullendorf–Oberloisdorf 28 April 1968.
16	GySEV	Hegyeshalom	Porpác	93.5	25 kV 50 Hz	active
17	GySEV	Szombathely	Zalaszentiván	48.9	25 kV 50 Hz	active
17	GySEV	Zalaszentiván	Nagykanizsa	54.4	non-electrified	active
18	GySEV	Szombathely	Kőszeg	17.3	non-electrified	Active. The original connection demolished with Oberloisdorf in 1969.
20	GySEV	Székesfehérvár	Szombathely	169.4	25 kV 50 Hz	active
20O	GySEV	Ajka	Padragkút Coal mines	5.9	non-electrified	inactive
20P	GySEV	Ajka	Felsőcsinger transfer	6.5	non-electrified	inactive
20Q	GySEV	Boba wye (Kerta–Jánosháza)		1.9	25 kV 50 Hz	active
21	GySEV	Szombathely	Szentgotthárd	53.2	25 kV 50 Hz	active
21	GySEV/ÖBB	Szentgotthárd	(Austria) Fehring	19.6	non-electrified	active
22	GySEV	Körmend	Zalalövő	22.3	non-electrified	last train: 12 December 2009
23	GySEV	Zalaegerszeg	Rédics	48.8	non-electrified	active
24	GySEV	Zalabér-Batyk	Zalaszentgrót	5.9	non-electrified	last train: 3 March 2007
25	GySEV	Boba	Zalaegerszeg	55.8	25 kV 50 Hz	active
25K	GySEV	Zalaegerszeg wye (Zalaszentiván–Andráshida)		3.3	25 kV 50 Hz	last train: 27 August 2023
25V	GySEV	Zalaegerszeg	Zalalövő	24.6	25 kV 50 Hz	active
25V	GySEV/SŽ	Zalalövő	(Slovenia) Hodoš	19.6	25 kV 50 Hz	active
26	GySEV	Balatonszentgyörgy	Keszthely	9.8	25 kV 50 Hz	active
26	GySEV	Keszthely	Ukk	53.0	non-electrified	active
26K	GySEV	Tapolca	Zalahaláp	4.9	non-electrified	only cargo
26L	GySEV	Uzsa	Uzsa mine	3.4	non-electrified	only cargo
27	MÁV	Lepsény	Csajág	8.2	non-electrified	last train: 3 March 2007
27	GySEV	Csajág	Hajmáskér	21.9	non-electrified	last train: 3 March 2007
29	MÁV	Szabadbattyán	Balatonfüred	54.1	25 kV 50 Hz	active
29	MÁV	Balatonfüred	Tapolca	52.6	non-electrified	active
30	MÁV	Budapest Déli	Balatonszentgyörgy	180.2	25 kV 50 Hz	active
30	GySEV	Balatonszentgyörgy	Murakeresztúr	53.8	25 kV 50 Hz	active
30H	GySEV/HŽ	Murakeresztúr	(Croatia) Kotoriba	4.3	non-electrified	last train: 8 December 2012
30M	MÁV	Érd Upper junction	Tárnok	3.7	25 kV 50 Hz	active
35	MÁV	Kaposvár	Siófok	99.7	non-electrified	active
36	MÁV	Kaposvár	Fonyód	51.7	non-electrified	active
37	MÁV	Somogyszob	Balatonmáriafürdő junction	52.9	non-electrified	last train: 12 December 2009
37K	GySEV	Balatonszentgyörgy junction	Sármellék	8.1	non-electrified	last train: 25 May 1974
38	MÁV	Nagyatád-Bodvica	Nagyatád	1.7	non-electrified	last train: 31 December 1976
38	MÁV	Nagyatád	Somogyszob	8.1	non-electrified	last train: 31 July 2023
40	MÁV	Budapest-Kelenföld	Pécs	222.3	25 kV 50 Hz	active
32	MÁV	Érd Lower junction	Érd	1.7	25 kV 50 Hz	active
40E	MÁV	Százhalombatta	Ercsi junction	11.3	25 kV 50 Hz	active
41	MÁV	Dombóvár	Gyékényes	100.7	25 kV 50 Hz	active
41H	GySEV/HŽ	Gyékényes	(Croatia) Koprivnica	14.4	25 kV 50 Hz	active
42	MÁV	Pusztaszabolcs	Dunaújváros	27.0	25 kV 50 Hz	active
42	MÁV	Dunaújváros	Mezőfalva junction	13.1	non-electrified	active
42	MÁV	Mezőfalva junction	Paks	38.7	non-electrified	last train: 12 December 2009
43	MÁV	Mezőfalva junction	Rétszilas	19.3	non-electrified	active
44	MÁV	Pusztaszabolcs	Börgönd	19.8	non-electrified	active
44	MÁV	Börgönd	Szabadbattyán	11.0	non-electrified	last train: 30 August 2015
45	MÁV	Székesfehérvár	Sárbogárd	38.2	non-electrified	active
46	MÁV	Rétszilas	Bátaszék	74.6	non-electrified	active
47	MÁV	Godisa	Komló	18.7	non-electrified	active
48	MÁV	Keszőhidegkút-Gyönk	Tamási	12.5	non-electrified	last train: 1 April 1990
49	MÁV	Enying	Lepsény	7.6	non-electrified	last train: 25 June 1999
40M	MÁV	Dombóvár wye (Dombóvár alsó– Dombóvár junction)		1.0	25 kV 50 Hz	active
50	MÁV	Dombóvár junction	Bátaszék	58.7	non-electrified	active
50K	MÁV	Hidas-Bonyhád	Bonyhád transfer	3.1	non-electrified	last train: 31 December 1960
60	GySEV	Murakeresztúr	Gyékényes	16.1	25 kV 50 Hz	active
60	MÁV	Gyékényes	Szentlőrinc	99.2	non-electrified	active
61	MÁV	Szentlőrinc	Sellye	23.7	non-electrified	active
62	MÁV	Középrigóc	Villány junction	91.7	non-electrified	Inactive. The last trains were the followings: Középrigóc–Sellye 7 May 2006, Sellye–Villány junction 3 March 2007.
64	MÁV	Pécs-Külváros	Bátaszék	57.2	non-electrified	Inactive. The last trains were the followings: Pécs-Külváros–Pécsvárad 12 December 2009, Pécsvárad–Palotabozsok 31 May 1997, Palotabozsok–Bátaszék 22 January 2003.
65	MÁV	Villány	Mohács	24.2	non-electrified	active
66	MÁV	Pécs	Pécsbánya-Rendező	1.9	25 kV 50 Hz	active
66	MÁV	Pécsbánya-Rendező	Villány	44.8	non-electrified	active
66	MÁV/HŽ	Villány	(Croatia) Osijek	46	non-electrified	active
70	MÁV	Budapest Nyugati	Vác	33.4	25 kV 50 Hz	active
70	MÁV/ŽSR	Vác	(Slovakia) Štúrovo	44.0	25 kV 50 Hz	active
1AT	MÁV	Rákosrendező	Vasúttörténeti Park	1.9	25 kV 50 Hz	last train: 2 November 2008
71	MÁV	Rákospalota-Újpest	Vácrátót	31.3	25 kV 50 Hz	active
H8	MÁV	Budapest Örs vezér tere	Gödöllő	25.6	1100 V DC	active
H9	MÁV	Cinkota	Csömör	4.3	1100 V DC	active
H9	MÁV	Csömör	Kistarcsa junction	4	non-electrified	last train: 14 June 2019
75	MÁV	Vác	Drégelypalánk	47.8	non-electrified	active
76	MÁV	Diósjenő	Romhány	17.1	non-electrified	last train: 3 March 2007
77	MÁV	Aszód	Vác	33.4	25 kV 50 Hz	active
78	MÁV	Galgamácsa	Balassagyarmat	49.4	non-electrified	active
75A	MÁV	Drégelypalánk	Balassagyarmat	21.6	non-electrified	active
78	MÁV	Balassagyarmat	Nógrádszakál	28.1	non-electrified	last train: 9 June 2023
78L	ŽSR/MÁV	(Slovakia) Veľký Krtíš	Nógrádszakál	16.3	non-electrified	last train: 31 May 1992
161	MÁV/ŽSR	Nógrádszakál	(Slovakia) Lučenec	25.2	non-electrified	Inactive. The last trains were the followings: Nógrádszakál–Ipolytarnóc 9 June 2023, Ipolytarnóc–Kalonda 31 May 1992, Kalonda–Lučenec 2 February 2003.
80	MÁV	Budapest Keleti	Nyíregyháza	269.3	25 kV 50 Hz	active
80S	MÁV	Visontai Kombinát	Nagyút	12.8	25 kV 50 Hz	only cargo
80Q	MÁV	Mezőkeresztes-Mezőnyárád	Bükkábrány	2.5	25 kV 50 Hz	only cargo
80U	MÁV	Miskolc-Tiszai wye (Miskolc-Rendező–Miskolc-Gömöri)		0.5	25 kV 50 Hz	active
80C	MÁV	Mezőzombor	Sátoraljaújhely	42.2	25 kV 50 Hz	active
80C	MÁV/ŽSR	Sátoraljaújhely	(Slovakia) Slovenské Nové Mesto	1.7	non-electrified	last train: 13 December 2008
80V	MÁV	Nyíregyháza wye (Nyíregyháza-Északi kitérő–Sóstóhegy)		1.4	25 kV 50 Hz	only cargo
81	MÁV	Hatvan	Somoskőújfalu	64.7	non-electrified	active
81	MÁV/ŽSR	Somoskőújfalu	(Slovakia) Fiľakovo	13.2	non-electrified	last train: 1 May 2011
82	MÁV	Hatvan	Újszász	52.0	25 kV 50 Hz	active
82K	MÁV	Hatvan wye (Jászfényszaru–Tura)		3.8	25 kV 50 Hz	only cargo
83	MÁV	Mátramindszent	Mátranovák-Homokterenye	5.1	non-electrified	last train: 28 May 1994
84	MÁV	Kisterenye	Kál-Kápolna	54.3	non-electrified	last train: 3 March 2007
85	MÁV	Vámosgyörk	Gyöngyös	12.5	25 kV 50 Hz	active
86	MÁV	Vámosgyörk	Újszász	61.3	non-electrified	active
87A	MÁV	Füzesabony	Eger	16.4	25 kV 50 Hz	active
87	MÁV	Eger	Eger-Felnémet	7.9	25 kV 50 Hz	active
87	MÁV	Eger-Felnémet	Szilvásvárad	25.9	non-electrified	active
87	MÁV	Szilvásvárad	Putnok	34.5	non-electrified	last train: 12 December 2009
87N	MÁV	Eger wye (Maklár–Eger-Felnémet)		2.0	25 kV 50 Hz	only cargo
88	MÁV	Mezőcsát	Hejőkeresztúr	16.4	non-electrified	last train: 3 March 2007
89	MÁV	Tiszapalkonya Power Station	Tiszaújváros	4.4	25 kV 50 Hz	last train: 14 December 2013
89	MÁV	Tiszaújváros	Nyékládháza	17.3	25 kV 50 Hz	active
90	MÁV	Felsőzsolca	Hidasnémeti	56.6	25 kV 50 Hz	active
169	MÁV/ŽSR	Hidasnémeti	(Slovakia) Barca	21.5	3 kV DC	active
92	MÁV	Miskolc Tiszai	Kazincbarcika	24.6	25 kV 50 Hz	active
92	MÁV	Kazincbarcika	Bánréve	20.9	non-electrified	active
92A	MÁV	Bánréve	Ózd	11.7	non-electrified	active
92Q	MÁV/ŽSR	Bánréve	(Slovakia) Lenartovce	1.6	non-electrified	last train: 13 December 2008
93	MÁV	Ládi Rakodó	Diósgyőr-Vasgyár	2.4	non-electrified	only cargo
93	MÁV	Diósgyőr-Vasgyár	Miskolc-Rendező	5.9	25 kV 50 Hz	only cargo
94	MÁV	Sajóecseg	Tornanádaska	49.3	non-electrified	active
94	MÁV	Tornanádaska	Hidvégardó transfer	5.1	non-electrified	last train: 7 February 1966
94	MÁV/ŽSR	Hidvégardó transfer	(Slovakia) Turňa nad Bodvou	3.5	non-electrified	last train: 8 May 1945
94L	MÁV	Sajóecseg	Sajóbábony	4.7	non-electrified	last train: 26 May 1963
95	MÁV	Kazincbarcika	Rudabánya	14.5	non-electrified	last train: 3 March 2007
98	MÁV	Szerencs	Abaújszántó	20.7	non-electrified	active
98	MÁV	Abaújszántó	Hidasnémeti	30.3	non-electrified	last train: 31 July 2023
100	MÁV	Budapest Nyugati	Záhony	335.7	25 kV 50 Hz	active
1AW	MÁV	Budapest Nyugati wye (Rákosrendező–Kőbánya-Teher)		1.4	25 kV 50 Hz	last train: 12 December 2009
1CM	MÁV	Vecsés	Soroksár	14.6	non-electrified	inactive
1CQ	MÁV	Pestszentimre wye (Kispest–Soroksár)		0.6	non-electrified	last train: 9 June 2001
100T	MÁV	Szolnok wye (Abony–Újszász)		23.9	25 kV 50 Hz	last train: 13 June 2021
100FM	MÁV	Komoró	Eperjeske-Átrakó	3.9	25 kV 50 Hz	only cargo
100FL	MÁV/UZ	Tuzsér	(Ukraine) Batyovo	20.3	non-electrified	only cargo
100	MÁV/UZ	Záhony	(Ukraine) Chop	4.7	non-electrified	active
100FN	MÁV	Mándok	Eperjeske-Rendező	4.2	non-electrified	only cargo
101	MÁV	Püspökladány	Biharkeresztes	50.2	25 kV 50 Hz	active
101	MÁV/CFR	Biharkeresztes	(Romania) Episcopia Bihor	12.5	non-electrified	active
102	MÁV	Kál-Kápolna	Kisújszállás	73.8	non-electrified	active
103	MÁV	Karcag	Tiszafüred	44.4	non-electrified	last train: 31 July 2023
104	MÁV	Kaba	Nádudvar	9.7	non-electrified	last train: 31 December 1971, demolished in 1972, but rebuilt in 1985
105	MÁV/CFR	Debrecen	(Romania) Valea lui Mihai	38.5	non-electrified	active
106	MÁV	Debrecen	Nagykereki	52.7	non-electrified	last train: 18 October 2025
107	MÁV	Sáránd	Létavértes	20.2	non-electrified	last train: 12 December 2009
108	MÁV	Debrecen	Füzesabony	103.0	non-electrified	active
109	MÁV	Tócóvölgy	Tiszalök	62.0	non-electrified	active
110	MÁV	Apafa	Nyírbátor	50.0	non-electrified	active
111	MÁV	Mátészalka	Záhony	57.2	non-electrified	active
112	MÁV	Nagykálló junction	Nyíradony	22.8	non-electrified	last train: 3 March 2007
113	MÁV	Nyíregyháza	Zajta	100.2	non-electrified	active
114	MÁV	Kocsord alsó	Csenger	25.7	non-electrified	last train: 31 July 2023
115	MÁV	Mátészalka	Tiborszállás	17.3	non-electrified	active
115	CFR/MÁV	Tiborszállás	(Romania) Carei	15.9	non-electrified	last train: 9 December 2023
116	MÁV	Nyíregyháza	Vásárosnamény	58.3	non-electrified	active
117	MÁV	Ohat-Pusztakócs	Tiszalök	64.6	non-electrified	last train: 12 December 2009
117	MÁV	Tiszalök	Görögszállás	17.7	non-electrified	active
120	MÁV	Szajol	Kétegyháza	102.1	25 kV 50 Hz	active
120	MÁV/CFR	Kétegyháza	(Romania) Arad	40.3	25 kV 50 Hz	active
120A	MÁV	Rákos	Szolnok	92.3	25 kV 50 Hz	active
120S	MÁV	Szajol wye (Törökszentmiklós–Tiszatenyő)		12.6	25 kV 50 Hz	only cargo
121	MÁV	Kétegyháza	Mezőhegyes	39.5	non-electrified	active
121	MÁV	Mezőhegyes	Újszeged	66.4	non-electrified	last train: 31 July 2023
125	MÁV	Mezőtúr	Mezőhegyes	97.1	non-electrified	active
125	MÁV	Mezőhegyes	Battonya	17.1	non-electrified	last train: 31 July 2023
126	MÁV	Kisszénás	Kondoros	5.7	non-electrified	last train: 12 December 2009
127	MÁV	Körösnagyharsány	Vésztő	31.1	non-electrified	last train: 12 December 2009
127	MÁV	Vésztő	Dévaványa	34.1	non-electrified	active
127B	MÁV	Dévaványa	Gyoma	18.2	non-electrified	active
128	MÁV	Kötegyán	Vésztő	28.1	non-electrified	active
128B	MÁV	Szeghalom	Püspökladány	46.1	non-electrified	active
129	MÁV	Murony	Békés	7.3	non-electrified	last train: 3 Marc 2007
130	MÁV	Tiszatenyő	Hódmezővásárhely-Népkert	91.4	non-electrified	active
130B	MÁV	Hódmezővásárhely	Makó junction	31.0	non-electrified	last train: 12 December 2009
135	MÁV	Szeged	Békéscsaba	96.6	non-electrified	active
135	MÁV	Békéscsaba	Kötegyán	35.5	non-electrified	active
135	MÁV/CFR	Kötegyán	(Romania) Salonta	13.2	non-electrified	active
136	ŽS/MÁV	Szeged-Rendező	(Serbia) Horgoš	17.6	25 kV 50 Hz	active
137	MÁV	Szeged wye (Kiskundorozsma–Röszke)		11.3	25 kV 50 Hz	only cargo
140	MÁV	Cegléd	Szeged	117.9	25 kV 50 Hz	active
140N	MÁV	Cegléd wye (Nyársapát–Abony)		23.9	25 kV 50 Hz	last train: 13 June 2021
142	MÁV	Kőbánya-Kispest	Kecskemét	86.5	non-electrified	active
145	MÁV	Kecskemét	Szolnok	66.0	non-electrified	active
146	MÁV	Kiskunfélegyháza	Lakitelek	25.4	non-electrified	active
146	MÁV	Lakitelek	Kunszentmárton junction	27.4	non-electrified	last train: 31 July 2023
146K	MÁV	Kecskemét wye (Kecskemét alsó–Városföld)		2.2	non-electrified	only cargo
147	MÁV	Kiskunfélegyháza	Orosháza	79.3	non-electrified	active
1AM	MÁV	Józsefváros	Ferencváros	5.6	25 kV 50 Hz	last train: 10 December 2005
150	MÁV	Ferencváros	Kiskunhalas	128.9	25 kV 50 Hz	last train: 30 April 2022
150	MÁV/ŽS	Kiskunhalas	(Serbia) Subotica	40.0	25 kV 50 Hz	last train: 30 April 2022
1BL	MÁV	Soroksári út	Budapest Port	4.6	non-electrified	only cargo
151	MÁV	Kunszentmiklós-Tass	Dunapataj	49.6	non-electrified	last train: 3 March 2007
151K	MÁV	Kunszentmiklós-Tass wye (Szalkszentmárton–Bösztör)		16.4	non-electrified	only cargo
151L	MÁV	Szalkszentmárton	Danube bridgehead	5.0	non-electrified	inactive, only an interim pontoon bridge existed in military practises
42L	MÁV	Dunaújváros Port	Dunaújváros	7.7	non-electrified	a bridgehead is beside of the port
152	MÁV	Fülöpszállás	Kecskemét alsó	38.5	non-electrified	last train: 3 March 2007
152K	MÁV	Fülöpszállás wye (Izsák–Csengőd)		1.0	non-electrified	only cargo
153	MÁV	Kiskőrös	Kalocsa	30.3	non-electrified	last train: 3 March 2007
153K	MÁV	Kalocsa	Foktő	7.1	non-electrified	only cargo
154	MÁV	Bátaszék	Kiskunhalas	96.0	non-electrified	active
154K	MÁV	Bácsalmás	Csikéria	10.5	non-electrified	last train: 1 November 1960
154M	MÁV	Baja Port	Baja	3.4	non-electrified	only cargo
154N	MÁV	Kiskunhalas wye (Külsőhalas–Harkakötöny)		9.4	non-electrified	last train: 22 April 2025
155	MÁV	Kiskunhalas	Kiskunfélegyháza	45.7	25 kV 50 Hz	active
H6	MÁV	Budapest Közvágóhíd	Ráckeve	40.1	1100 V DC	active
H7	MÁV	Boráros tér	Csepel	6.7	1100 V DC	active
131	MÁV	Szeged MÁV station	Szeged-Rókus MÁV station	6.1	600 V DC	active
131A	MÁV	Hódmezővásárhely-Népkert MÁV station	Hódmezővásárhely MÁV station	3.5	600 V DC	active
132	SzKT	Szeged Pál Vásárhelyi út	Szeged Európa liget	1.8	600 V DC	active
133	SzKT	Szeged Tarján	Szeged Fonógyári út	8.0	600 V DC	active
134	SzKT	Szeged Dugonics tér	Szeged Kecskés	2.6	600 V DC	active
100B	DKV	Debrecen MÁV station	Debrecen University	4.4	600 V DC	active
100C	DKV	Debrecen Kálvin tér	Debrecen Doberdó út	3.6	600 V DC	active
96	MVK	Miskolc Tiszai MÁV station	Miskolc Felső-Majláth	10.8	600 V DC	active
96A	MVK	Miskolc Újgyőri piac	Miskolc Újgyőri főtér	1.7	600 V DC	active, across Vasgyár
M1	BKV	Vörösmarty tér	Mexikói út	4.4	600 V DC	active
M2	BKV	Budapest Déli MÁV station	Örs vezér tere	10.3	825 V DC (third rail)	active
M3	BKV	Kőbánya-Kispest MÁV station	Újpest-Központ	17.3	825 V DC (third rail)	active
M4	BKV	Kelenföld MÁV station	Budapest Keleti MÁV station	7.4	825 V DC (third rail)	active
201	BKV	Bécsi út	Kelenföld MÁV station	18.2	600 V DC	active
202	BKV	Jászai Mari tér	Közvágóhíd	6.0	600 V DC	active
203	BKV	Nagykőrösi út	Nagy Lajos király útja	10.4	600 V DC	active
204	BKV	Széll Kálmán tér	Újbuda-Központ	8.5	600 V DC	active
206	BKV	Petői híd, budai hídfő	Móricz Zsigmond körtér	0.6	600 V DC	active
212	BKV	Rákospalota-Újpest MÁV station	Rákospalota, Kossuth utca	1.7	600 V DC	active
214	BKV	Lehel tér	Káposztásmegyer, Megyeri út	11.1	600 V DC	active
217	BKV	Török utca wye (Szent Lukács Gyógyfürdő–Mechwart liget)		0.2	600 V DC	active
219	BKV	Vörösvári út	Kelenföld MÁV station	11.2	600 V DC	active
224	BKV	Budapest Keleti MÁV station	Soroksári út	4.2	600 V DC	active
228	BKV	Blaha Lujza tér	Magdolna tér	1.3	600 V DC	active
229	BKV	Pongrác úti lakótelep	BNV main entrance	0.5	non-electrified	last train: 29 September 1996
236	BKV	Orczy tér	Kőbánya alsó	3.0	600 V DC	active
236	BKV	Kőbánya alsó	Kápolna tér	0.6	600 V DC	last train: 1 September 1994
237	BKV	Teleki László tér	Izraelita temető	9.3	600 V DC	active
241	BKV	Budafok kocsiszín	Kamaraerdei Ifjúsági Park	4.9	600 V DC	active
242	BKV	Határ út	Kispest, Tulipán utca	3.0	600 V DC	active
242	BKV	Kispest, Tulipán utca	Kispest, Villanytelep	1.0	600 V DC	inactive
244	BKV	Dózsa György út	Bosnyák tér	2.6	600 V DC	last train: 24 December 1995
247	BKV	Móricz Zsigmond körtér	Városház tér	5.9	600 V DC	active
248	BKV	Budafok kocsiszín	Savoya park	0.7	600 V DC	active
249	BKV	Deák Ferenc tér	Szent Gellért tér	1.9	600 V DC	active
250	BKV	Határ út	Pestszentlőrinc, Béke tér	8.0	600 V DC	active
251	BKV	Ferenc körút	Török Flóris utca	5.2	600 V DC	active
252	BKV	Határ út	Jókai Mór utca	11.4	600 V DC	active, across Pesterzsébet-Pacsirtatelep
256	BKV	Budapest Déli MÁV station	Rudas Gyógyfürdő	2.2	600 V DC	active
259	BKV	Budapest Déli MÁV station	Márton Áron tér	3.3	600 V DC	active
260	BKV	Városmajor	Széchenyihegy	3.7	1500 V DC	active, cog-wheel
261	BKV	Hűvösvölgy	Móricz Zsigmond körtér	11.0	600 V DC	active
267	BKV	Zugló MÁV station	Erzsébet királyné útja	0.8	600 V DC	last train: 10 March 1997
269	BKV	Mexikói út	Újpalota, Erdőkerülő utca	6.5	600 V DC	active
300	BKV	Clark Ádám tér	Szent György tér	0.1	electrified	active, funicular
Nr.	Operator	Start station	End station	Length (km)	Electrification	Current status

Operated by MÁV
Operated by GySEV
BHÉV lines of the MÁV
Tram lines
Metro lines
Special railways

== Narrow gauge railways ==
Most railways have a track gauge of 760 mm (2 ft 5 15/16 in), but few of them 600 mm (1 ft 11 5/8 in). None of the narrow gauge railways are electrified.

Nr.	Operator	Start station	End station	Length (km)	Track gauge	Current status
6	FUNA	Puskás Academy	Alcsút Arboretum	5.7	760 mm	active, on the place of the normal gauge line.
7	MÁV	Hűvösvölgy	Széchenyihegy	11.2	760 mm	active, children's railway
8A	GySEV	Fertőboz GySEV station	Barátság	1.2	760 mm	active, children's railway
8B	GySEV	Barátság	Nagycenk Kastély	3.3	760 mm	active, children's railway
39	MÁV	Balatonfenyves MÁV station	Csisztafürdő	11.8	760 mm	active
39B	MÁV	Imremajor	Somogyszentpál	8.1	760 mm	active
39K	MÁV	Táska junction	Táska	5.8	760 mm	last train in 2002
118	MÁV	Nyíregyháza Átrakó	Balsa Tiszapart	38.4	760 mm	last train in 2009
119	MÁV	Herminatanya	Dombrád	27.9	760 mm	last train in 2009
148	MÁV	Törökfái	Kiskőrös MÁV station	45.6	760 mm	last train in 2009
149	Metavia Rail	Kecskemét alsó MÁV station	Kiskunmajsa MÁV station	51.6	760 mm	only with draisine
305	Zalaerdő	Lenti MÁV station	Kistolmács lake	32	760 mm	active
305K	Zalaerdő	Zajda-Doboskert	Szilvágy	17	760 mm	only cargo
305L	Zalaerdő	Törösznek	Feketeberek	10	760 mm	only cargo
305M	Zalaerdő	Pördefölde	Hosszúrét	4	760 mm	only cargo
305N	Zalaerdő	Víznyomó	Márki rét	16	760 mm	only cargo
305O	Zalaerdő	Oltárc	Eger-völgy	2	760 mm	only cargo
305P	Zalaerdő	Haraszt junction	Bánkürtös	9	760 mm	only cargo
305Q	Zalaerdő	Várfölde	Kövecsecs	7	760 mm	only cargo
307	Kaszó Zrt.	Szenta MÁV station	Baláta Lake	6	760 mm	last train in 2012
307	Kaszó Zrt.	Baláta Lake	Kaszó	2	760 mm	active
308	Mecsekerdő	Almamellék	Sasrét fűrésztelep	7	600 mm	active
308A	Mecsekerdő	Lukafa junction	Lukafa	1	600 mm	inactive
310	Gemenc	Pörböly MÁV station	Malomtelelő	8	760 mm	active
310	Gemenc	Malomtelelő	Gemenc-Danube bank	12	760 mm	last train in 2020
310A	Gemenc	Gemenc wye	Keselyűs	5	760 mm	last train in 2020
310A	Gemenc	Keselyűs	Bárányfok	6	760 mm	last train in 2014
311	SEFAG	Mesztegnyő MÁV station	Felsőkak	8.4	760 mm	active
312	MKA	Pécs Zoo	Dömör-kapu	0.6	760 mm	active
317	Ipolyerdő	Kismaros MÁV station	Királyrét	11.6	760 mm	active
317A	Ipolyerdő	Királyrét	Királyrét alsó	0.8	760 mm	only with draisine
318	BKv Nkft	Szob MÁV station	Márianosztra	6.7	760 mm	active
318	Börzsöny 2000	Márianosztra	Nagyirtás	6.4	760 mm	active
318	NEKV	Nagyirtás	Nagybörzsöny	7.6	760 mm	active
319	KBKE	Kemence	Feketevölgy	4.0	600 mm	active
319	KBKE	Feketevölgy	Halyagos	3.2	600 mm	inactive
321	Egererdő	Felsőtárkány Fűtőház	Stimeczház	4.8	760 mm	active
323	Egererdő	Szilvásvárad Fatelep	Szalajka-Fátyolvízesés	4.5	760 mm	active
324	Egererdő	Gyöngyös junction	Szalajkaház	11.6	760 mm	active
325	Egererdő	Gyöngyös	Mátrafüred	6.3	760 mm	active
330	Északerdő	Miskolc Dorottya utca	Garadna	13.9	760 mm	active
331	Északerdő	Papírgyár	Mahóca	10.6	760 mm	only cargo
332	Északerdő	Pálháza	Rostalló	7	760 mm	active
333	DKV	Debrecen Fatelep	Hármashegyalja	16	760 mm	active
334	Culturpark	Debrecen Amusement park	Debrecen Amusement park	1.1	760 mm	active, circle railway
335	HNP	Hortobágyi Halastó MÁV station	Kondás-tó	5.2	760 mm	last train in 2023
336	Local government	Tiszakécske	Tópart	2.8	760 mm	active, children's railway
337	Szegedfish	Lake Fehér	Sándorfalva	11.9	760 mm	only cargo
338	KNP	Tömörkény Halastó	Csaj tó	8	760 mm	last train in 2021
339	Local government	Szegvár	Hemp Factory		760 mm	last train in 2012
340	EVE	Gödöllő Arboretum	Csemete rét	0.5	760 mm	last train in 2023

Operator is a traffic organizer company
Operator is a forestry
Operator is not a forestry or traffic organizer company

== See also ==
- Hungarian State Railways (MÁV)
- Raaberbahn (GySEV)
- Budapesti Közlekedési Zrt. (BKV)
- BHÉV (Suburban railways to Budapest)
- Budapest Metro
- Trams in Budapest
- Trams in Szeged
- Trams in Debrecen
- Trams in Miskolc
