= Szatymaz =

- Village
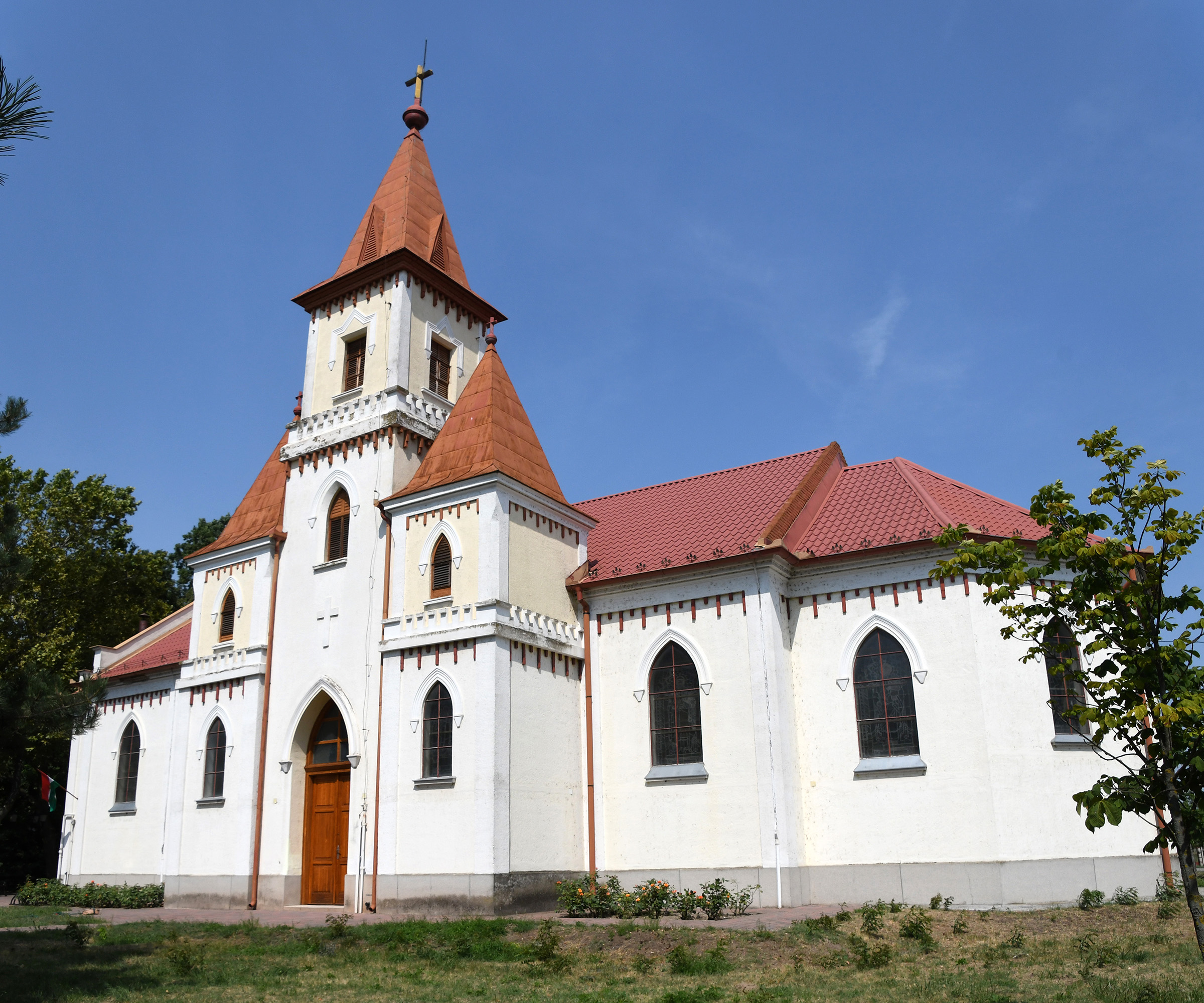
- Roman Catholic church in Szatymaz

- Coat of arms

- Location within Csongrád County Location within Hungary
- Coordinates: 46°21′N 20°03′E
- Country: Hungary
- County: Csongrád-Csanád
- District: Szeged

Area
  - Total: 53.72 km^{2} (20.74 sq mi)

Population (2019)
  - Total: 4,728
  - Density: 88.01/km^{2} (227.9/sq mi)
- Time zone: UTC+1 (CET)
  - Summer (DST): UTC+2 (CEST)
- Postal code: 6763
- Area code: 62

Szatymaz is a village in Csongrád county, in the Southern Great Plain region of southern Hungary. The village lies 12 kilometers northwest of Szeged, neighboring Lake Fehér, a part of Kiskunság National Park. Szatymaz is accessible via the M5-Motorway, and by rail via Szeged-Budapest train lines, including the Intercity trains which pass through the village.

== History ==
The area around Szatymaz has been inhabited since the early Bronze Age (2500–1700 B.C.). Archaeological remains of settlements dating from the time of the Pannonian Avars, and the early Kingdom of Hungary have been found in Szatymaz and its surroundings. The name "Szatymaz" likely derives from an old Cuman family name. Szatymaz was first mentioned in writing as a location on a 1676 Habsburg map, which identified it as a postal stop between Szeged and Kistelek.

During the first half of the 18th century, inhabitants of Szeged bought land, and built small buildings around the postal stop to be used for agriculture and animal husbandry. These initial settlements soon developed into permanently inhabited farms, and grapes were cultivated. Vineyards bearing the names Ádokhegy, Neszűrjhegy and Szűcsök hegye were established. Following the completion of the Szeged-Budapest railway in 1854, the vineyards of Szatymaz became a popular vacation spot for Szeged's middle class, some of whom even built villas there, which are no longer standing. Following this settlement, today's village of Szatymaz took shape, and in 1902 the village church was constructed using donations from locals.

In August 1919, following the Hungarian Soviet Republic's 131-day reign of terror which left over 500 dead, 10 Jewish communists were publicly hanged in Szatymaz under the command of Pál Prónay, and one was shot by general Bibó Dénes.

== Geography ==
It covers an area of 53.72 km^{2} (21 sq mi) and has a population of 4675 people (2015). Szatymaz lies in the Southern Great Plain region of Hungary.

== Demographics ==
Szatymaz has a current population of 4728 inhabitants. The village is 50.7% female, and 49.3% male, and 71.5% of its population is between the ages of 15 and 65.

Population of Szatymaz
1980	1990	2001	2011	2015	2019
3781	3469	4276	4658	4675	4728

In 2001, 100.0% of the village inhabitants identified themselves as Hungarian.

According to the 2011 census, Szatymaz is 98.6% Hungarian, 0.2% Gypsy, 0.5% German, 0.2% Romanian, and 0.5% Serb, and is 48.4% Roman Catholic, 2.5% Calvinist, 0.5% Evangelical, 0.2% Greek Orthodox, 20.7% non-denominational Christian, and 25.8% of the population chose not to answer.
