= Almamellék State Forest Railway =

Railway line in Hungary

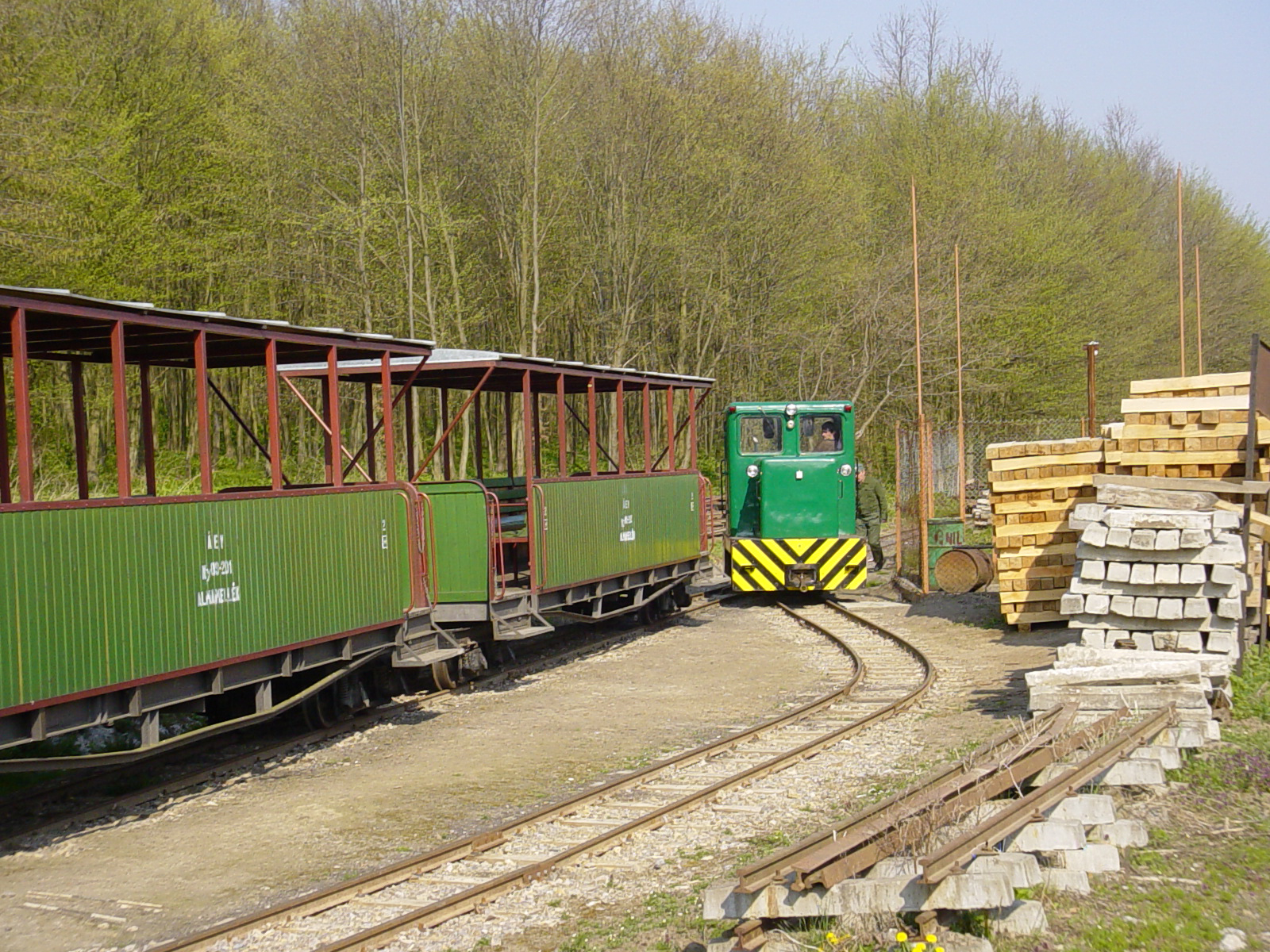
- C-50 diesel locomotive shunting at Sasrét

Overview
- Native name: Almamelléki Állami Erdei Vasút
- Locale: Hungary
- Coordinates: 46°10′4″N 17°53′21″E
- Stations: 6

Technical
- Line length: 8 km (5 miles)
- Track gauge: 600 mm (1 ft 11 5/8 in)

The Almamellék State Forest Railway (Hungarian: Almamelléki Állami Erdei Vasút) is a 600 mm (1 ft 11 5/8 in) railway line built on the former Kaposvár-Szigetvár railway line in Hungary. It is currently operational between Almamellék and Sasrét. The Lukafa branch line was formerly regularly operated, but it is now disused.

== Motive Power ==
Identity	Type	Builder	Notes
C21-406		MÁV Északi	Stored offsite at Esztergom
C50-401	4wDM	MÁV Északi	
C50-402	4wDM	MÁV Északi	
C50-403	4wDM	MÁV Északi	Regauged in 1970
MD40			Exhibit
