= Eperjeske =

Village in Szabolcs-Szatmár-Bereg, Hungary

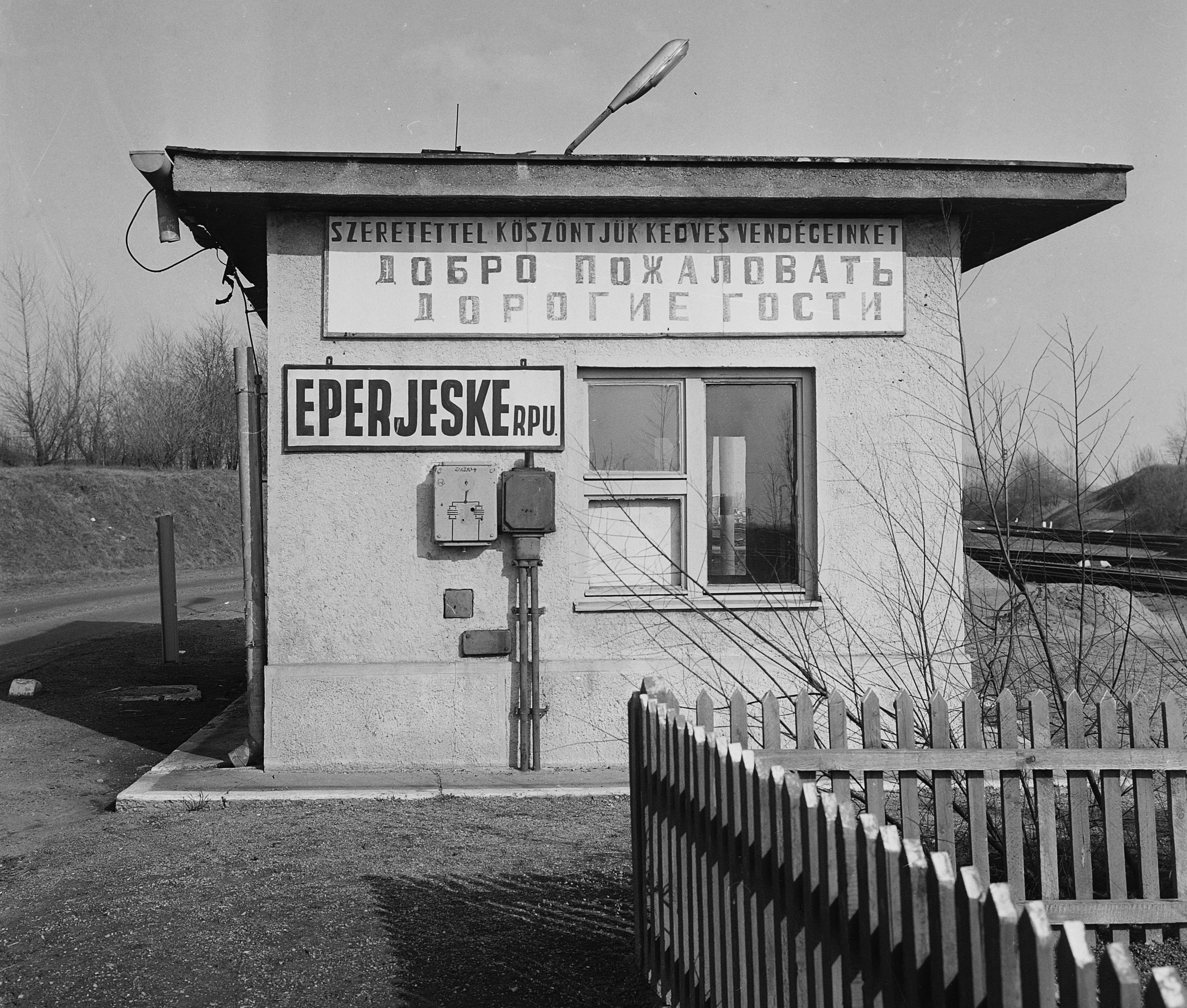
- Building at the border’s marshaling yard (1977)

- Location within Szabolcs-Szatmár-Bereg County Location within Hungary
- Coordinates: 48°21′N 22°13′E
- Country: Hungary
- County: Szabolcs-Szatmár-Bereg

Area
  - Total: 13.57 km^{2} (5.24 sq mi)

Population (2015)
  - Total: 1,260
  - Density: 93.1/km^{2} (241/sq mi)
- Time zone: UTC+1 (CET)
  - Summer (DST): UTC+2 (CEST)
- Postal code: 4646
- Area code: 45

Eperjeske is a village in Szabolcs-Szatmár-Bereg County, in the Northern Great Plain region of eastern Hungary.

== Geography ==
It covers an area of 13.57 km^{2} (5 sq mi) and has a population of 1260 people (2015).
