= Kötegyán =

Coordinates: 46°44′N 21°29′E

- Interactive map of Kötegyán
- Country: Hungary
- County: Békés

Area
  - Total: 42.97 km^{2} (16.59 sq mi)

Population (2015)
  - Total: 1,463
  - Density: 34.1/km^{2} (88/sq mi)
- Time zone: UTC+1 (CET)
  - Summer (DST): UTC+2 (CEST)
- Postal code: 5725
- Area code: 66

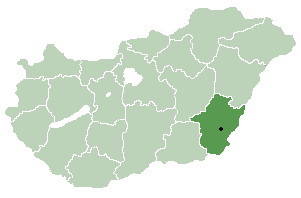
Location of Békés County in Hungary

Kötegyán is a village in Békés County, in the Southern Great Plain region of south-east Hungary.

== Geography ==
It covers an area of 42.97 km^{2} and has a population of 1463 people (2015).
