= Tiborszállás =

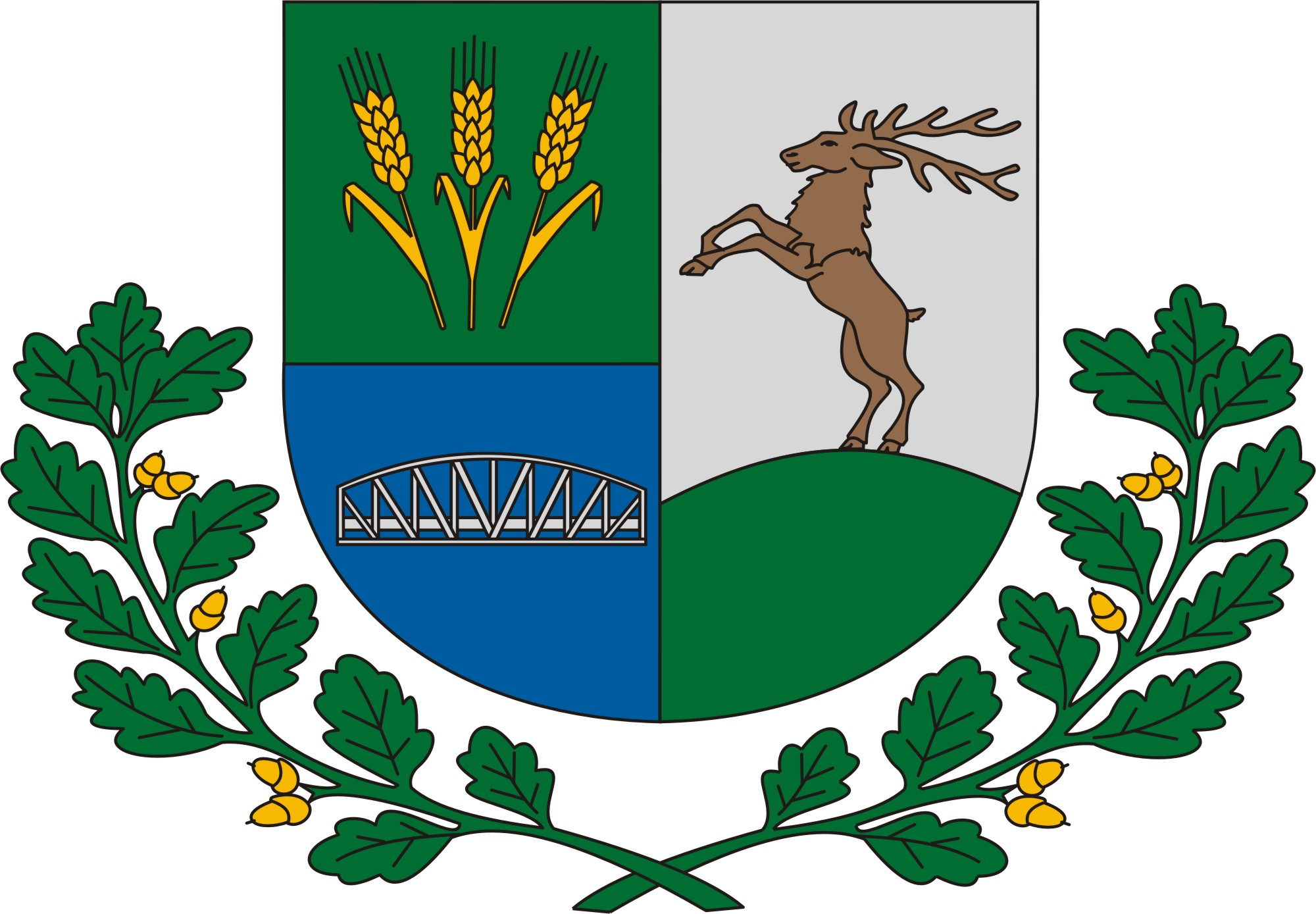
- Coat of arms

- Location of Tiborszállás in Hungary
- Coordinates: 47°49′N 22°25′E
- Country: Hungary
- Region: Northern Great Plain
- County: Szabolcs-Szatmár-Bereg

Area
  - Total: 25.52 km^{2} (9.85 sq mi)

Population (2015)
  - Total: 1,023
  - Density: 40.09/km^{2} (103.8/sq mi)
- Time zone: UTC+1 (CET)
  - Summer (DST): UTC+2 (CEST)
- Postal code: 4353
- Area code: +36 44
- Website: http://www.tiborszallas.hu/

Tiborszállás is a village in Szabolcs-Szatmár-Bereg county, in the Northern Great Plain region of eastern Hungary.

== Geography ==
It covers an area of 25.52 km^{2} (10 sq mi) and has a population of 1023 people (2015).

== History ==
The village was named after Tibor Károlyi, a member of the Károlyi family.

The three homesteads were part of the estate of Count Charles. Tiborszállás was established in the late 1800s, when Count Tibor Károlyi and his family moved to this region. Count Tibor's daughter was taken by her cousin, Gyula Károlyi. Significant progress was made in his time. The count, who was also the Prime Minister between 31 August 1931 and 21 September 1932, set up a model farm on his estate here: the Vadaskert, in the center of which was the forest and game management area, the Halmos farm and the associated lands . In Tiborszállás, farming was also the main occupation.

Today's Tiborszállás was organized from three farm settlements, Tiborszállás, formerly belonging to Mérk, Vadaskert and Halmos Farm, into an independent village in 1955.

=== Szentmarton ===
On the outskirts of the settlement is the site of the destroyed village of Szentmárton.

Its name first appears from known sources in 1217, when Gende (Gende de v. Senmartin), a local serf of the Sárvár monastery, accused a man from the countryside.

The village is one of the ancient estates of the Gutkeled clan.

Sárvár Monastery's 12th-century founders attached it to their church as a donation. It was already called a village in 1217. Its fate was shared with the monastery, and after its destruction, the village began to decay. It was still inhabited in 1427, but three abandoned stone churches showed a large decline in population.

According to Maksai, the village lay between Mérk and Fábiánháza, allegedly swallowed by a bog, and its ruins were found in a small island in the forest of St. Martin. This area now belongs to Tiborszállás.

The village has no historically recognized landmarks.
