= Szob-Nagybörzsöny forest railway =

Railway line in Hungary

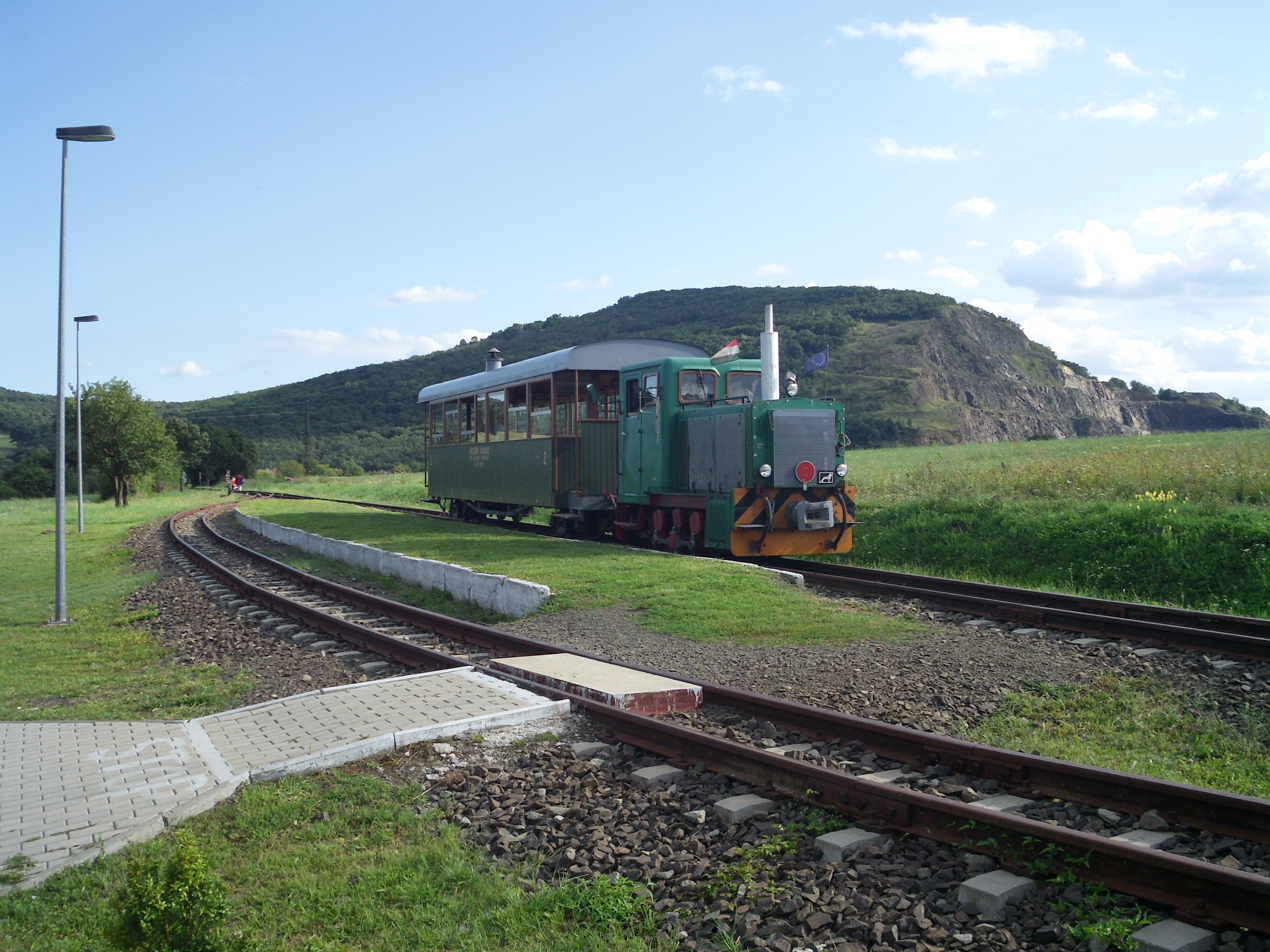
- Narrow-gauge train of Börzsöny Kisvasút at the station in Márianosztra

Overview
- Native name: Szob–Nagybörzsöny erdei vasút
- Locale: Hungary
- Termini: Szob; Nagybörzsöny
- Stations: 12

Service
- Route number: 318

Technical
- Line length: 20.8 km (13 mi)
- Track gauge: 760 mm (2 ft 5 15/16 in) Bosnian gauge
Route map
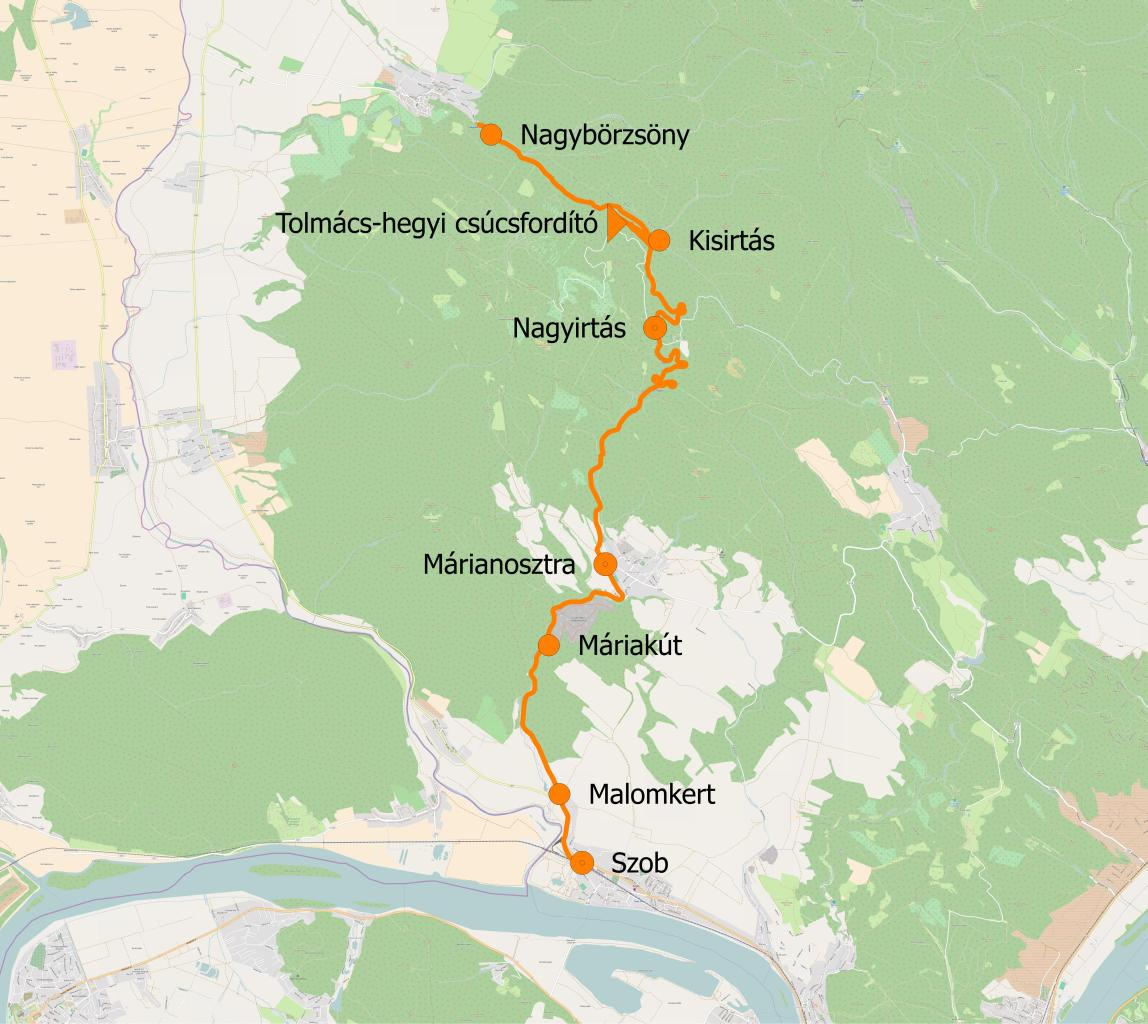

The Szob-Nagybörzsöny forest railway (Hungarian: Szob–Nagybörzsöny erdei vasút) is a 760 mm (2 ft 5 15/16 in) forest railway in Hungary. It runs from Szob to Nagybörzsöny, and was formed by the merger of three separate organisations. The railway is notable for having switch-back operation.

== Motive power ==
Vehicles are restricted to certain sections of the line.

| Identity | Builder | Year built | Status | Notes | Image |
|---|---|---|---|---|---|
| D04-601 | | | Szob–Márianosztra | | |
| MD40-001 | | | Szob–Márianosztra | | |
| 98 55 8242 002-4 | | | Szob–Márianosztra | Previously 2601 | |
| 3737 | | | Szob–Márianosztra | | |
| GV 3739 | MÁV Északi Főműhely | 1954 | Nagyirtás–Nagybörzsöny | | |
| GV 3756 | MÁV Északi Főműhely | 1955 | Nagyirtás–Nagybörzsöny | | |
| 98 55 8444 001-5 | Börzsöny Kft | 2016 | Nagyirtás–Nagybörzsöny | M06-401 Railcar | |
