= Zalaszentiván =

Coordinates: 46°53′N 16°54′E

- Village
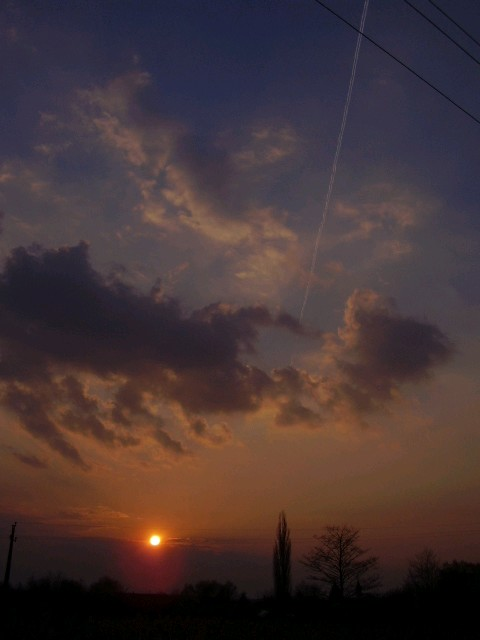

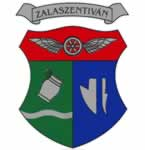
- Seal
- Interactive map of Zalaszentiván
- Country: Hungary
- Region: Western Transdanubia
- County: Zala County

Area
  - Total: 5.06 sq mi (13.10 km^{2})

Population (January 2008)
  - Total: 1,075
  - Density: 212.5/sq mi (82.06/km^{2})
- Time zone: UTC+1 (CET)
  - Summer (DST): UTC+2 (CEST)
- Zipcode: 8921
- Area code: 92

Zalaszentiván is a village in Zala County, Hungary. It lies on the course of the Sárvíz stream, which passes through the village shortly before flowing into the left bank of the Zala river.
