= Debrecen amusement park railway =

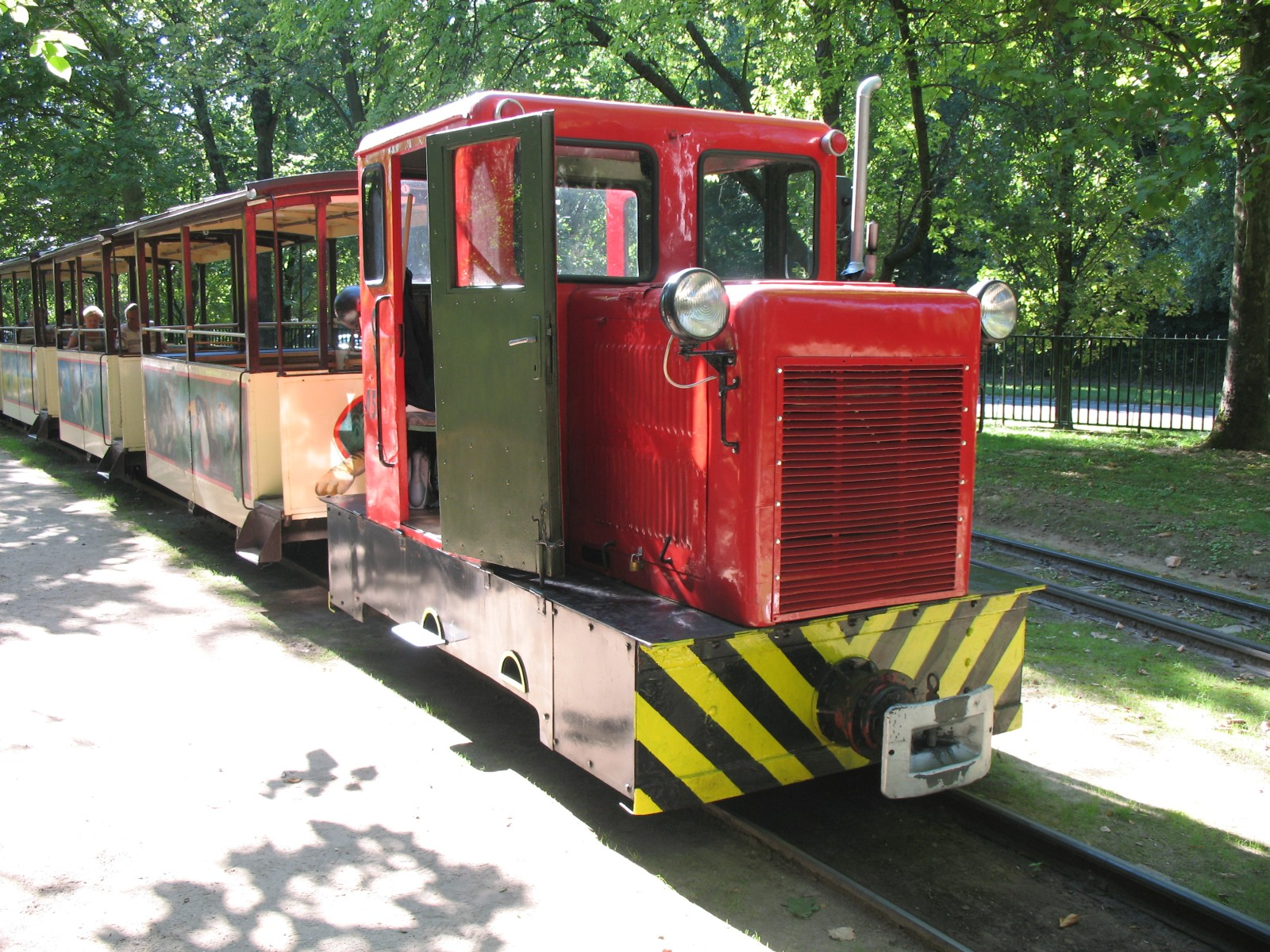
- GV-4505 stands at the terminus

Overview
- Native name: Debreceni Vidámparki Kisvasút
- Locale: Hungary
- Coordinates: 47.554°N 21.637°E
- Stations: 1

Technical
- Line length: 1,100 m (1,203 yd)
- Track gauge: 760 mm (2 ft 5 15/16 in) Bosnian gauge

The Debrecen amusement park railway (Hungarian: Debreceni Vidámparki Kisvasút) is a short 760 mm (2 ft 5 15/16 in) narrow gauge railway located in Debrecen, Hungary. Its fleet consists of a single C50 diesel locomotive GV-4505.
