= Csajág =

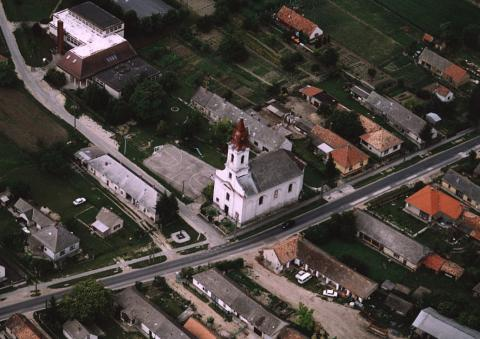

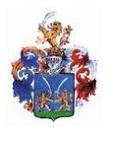
- Coat of arms

- Location of Veszprém county in Hungary

- Location of Csajág
- Coordinates: 47.04509°N 18.18526°E
- Country: Hungary
- County: Veszprém

Area
  - Total: 22.37 km^{2} (8.64 sq mi)

Population (2004)
  - Total: 889
  - Density: 39.74/km^{2} (102.9/sq mi)
- Time zone: UTC+1 (CET)
  - Summer (DST): UTC+2 (CEST)
- Postal code: 8163
- Area code: 88

Csajág is a village in Veszprém county, Hungary. As of January 1, 2025, its total permanent population was 853.
