= Sóstóhegy =

Nyíregyháza-Sóstóhegy
- Location of Nyíregyháza-Sóstóhegy
- Coordinates: 48.001007°N 21.745462°E
- Country: Hungary
- County: Szabolcs-Szatmár-Bereg

Population (2009)
  - Total: 4,683
- Time zone: UTC+1 (CET)
  - Summer (DST): UTC+2 (CEST)
- Postal code: 4481
- Area code: 42

Nyíregyháza-Sóstóhegy is located 7 kilometres north of Nyíregyháza in Hungary. The district is in the suburban zone of Nyíregyháza and most of inhabitants works in the city. There are only family and detached houses. Only a rail line severs Sóstóhegy from its neighbour named Sóstógyógyfürdő which is a recreation area. This district is also part of Nyíregyháza where there are parks, restaurants, hotels, a salty lake, an open-air museum, a forest, a spa with several pools and a water park. The most well-known attraction is the local zoo.

== Approach ==
Sóstóhegy can be approached from many directions:

- On two roads: Korányi Frigyes and Sóstói-Kemecsei Road from Nyíregyháza
- On several streets from Nyíregyháza-Sóstógyógyfürdő
- From Nyírszőlős
- From Nyírtura
- On a well-maintained dirt road from Nyírpazony
- On the Kemecsei Road from Nagyhalász-Kótaj
- By train along the Nyíregyháza-Záhony line
- By bus (Number 14, 14F or several coaches)

== Statistics ==
KSH:

- Population: 4683
- Number of flats: 1475
- Uninhabited holiday homes: 83
- Other inhabited units: 3
