= Cegléd–Szeged railway =

Railway line in Hungary

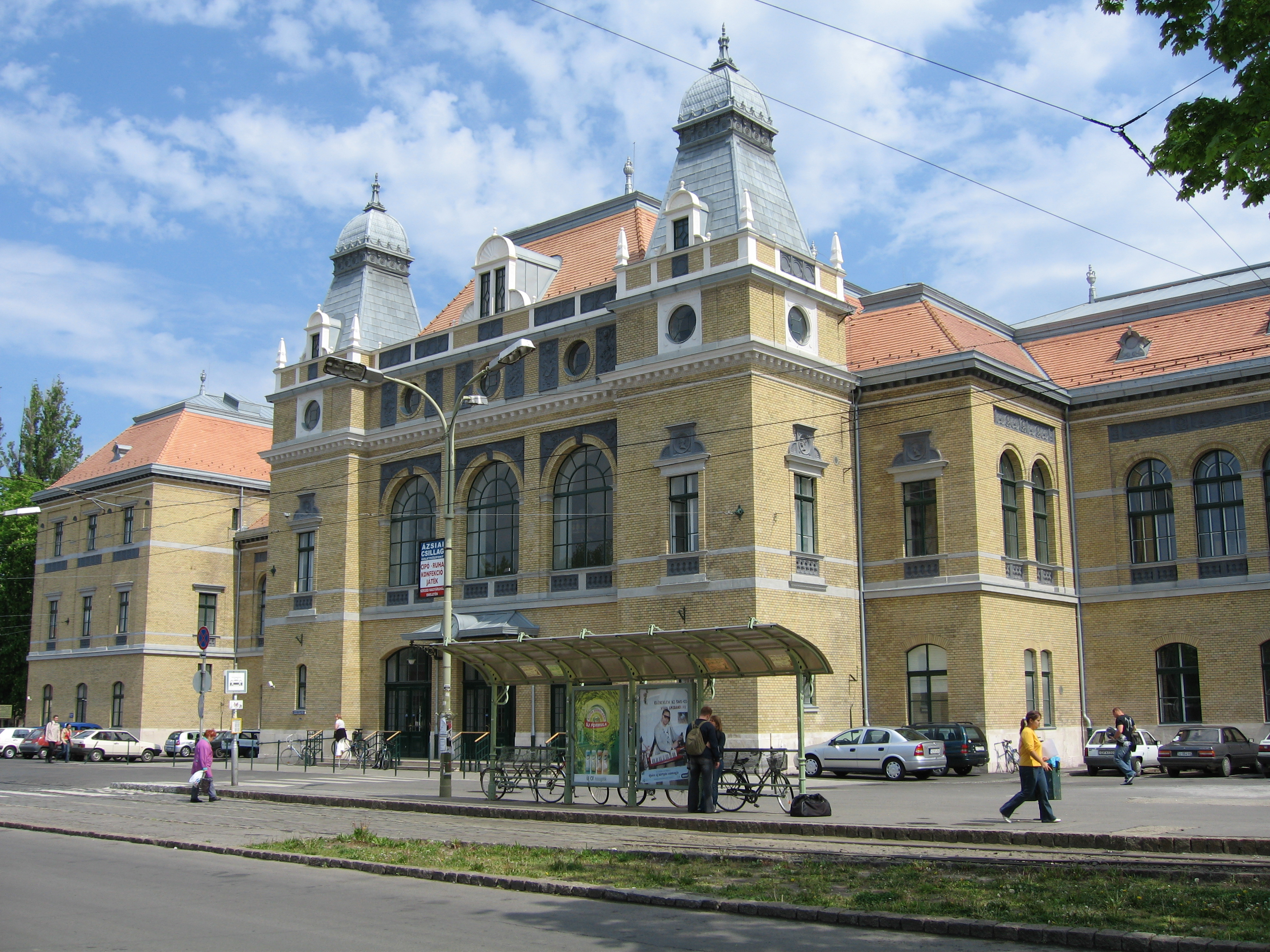
- Szeged állomás

Overview
- Line number: 140

Technical
- Line length: 118 km
- Track gauge: 1435 mm
- Electrification: 25 kV 50 Hz AC
- Operating speed: 120 (100) max.

Cegléd–Szeged railway line is the number 140 line of the MÁV. It is a simple/double track, electrified track. It goes on as Line number 100, which connects Budapest or Szolnok, Debrecen, Nyíregyháza. The line from Cegléd to Szeged is 118 km long.

== History ==
After Pest had been connected with the railway northwards, it was also considered constructing railways in the southeastern direction. In 1846, a private company was founded in Szeged, associating itself with the Hungarian Central Railway, for the purpose of building a new railway from Cegléd via Kecskemét, Szeged to Temesvár. At the end of 1847, the most plan was once complete with the estimated budget. In May 1850, the company sent a deputation to Vienna in order to request the national financial support. The trade minister guaranteed the construction of the railway at the public expense and assigned Ghega to examine the plan and the financial report. Through the resolution of 5 May 1851, the section Cegléd–Szeged was arranged to be constructed at the public expense. On 3 September 1853, the section Cegléd–Félegyháza, and on 4 March 1854, the section Félegyháza–Szeged was respectively opened for traffic. For connection with the Banat, the railway bridge had to be built on the Tisa.

With the acquisition of the State Railway Company (StEG) in 1855, the railway became part of it. On the other hand, the section Szeged–Temesvár was then on the construction. According to the document of the concession, the state was under the duty to construct the rest section to the end.

== Pictures ==
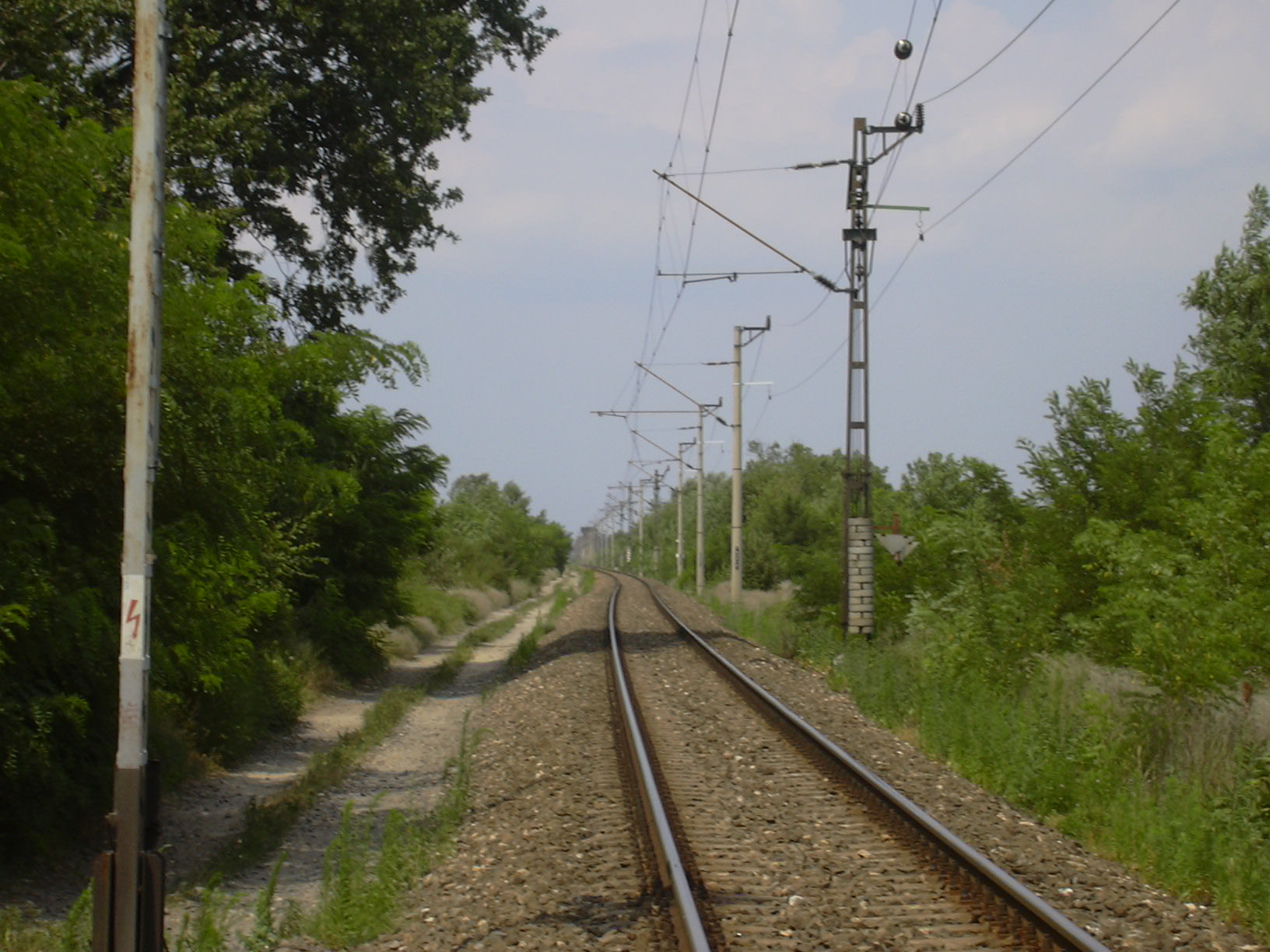
The line

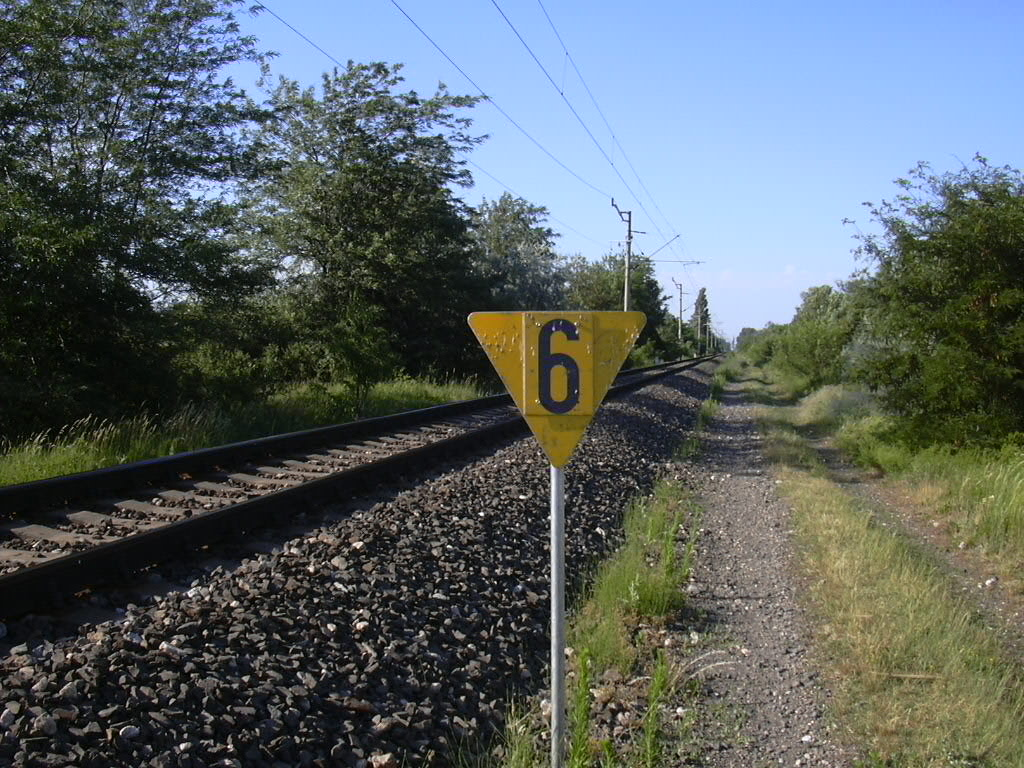
The old line before renovation

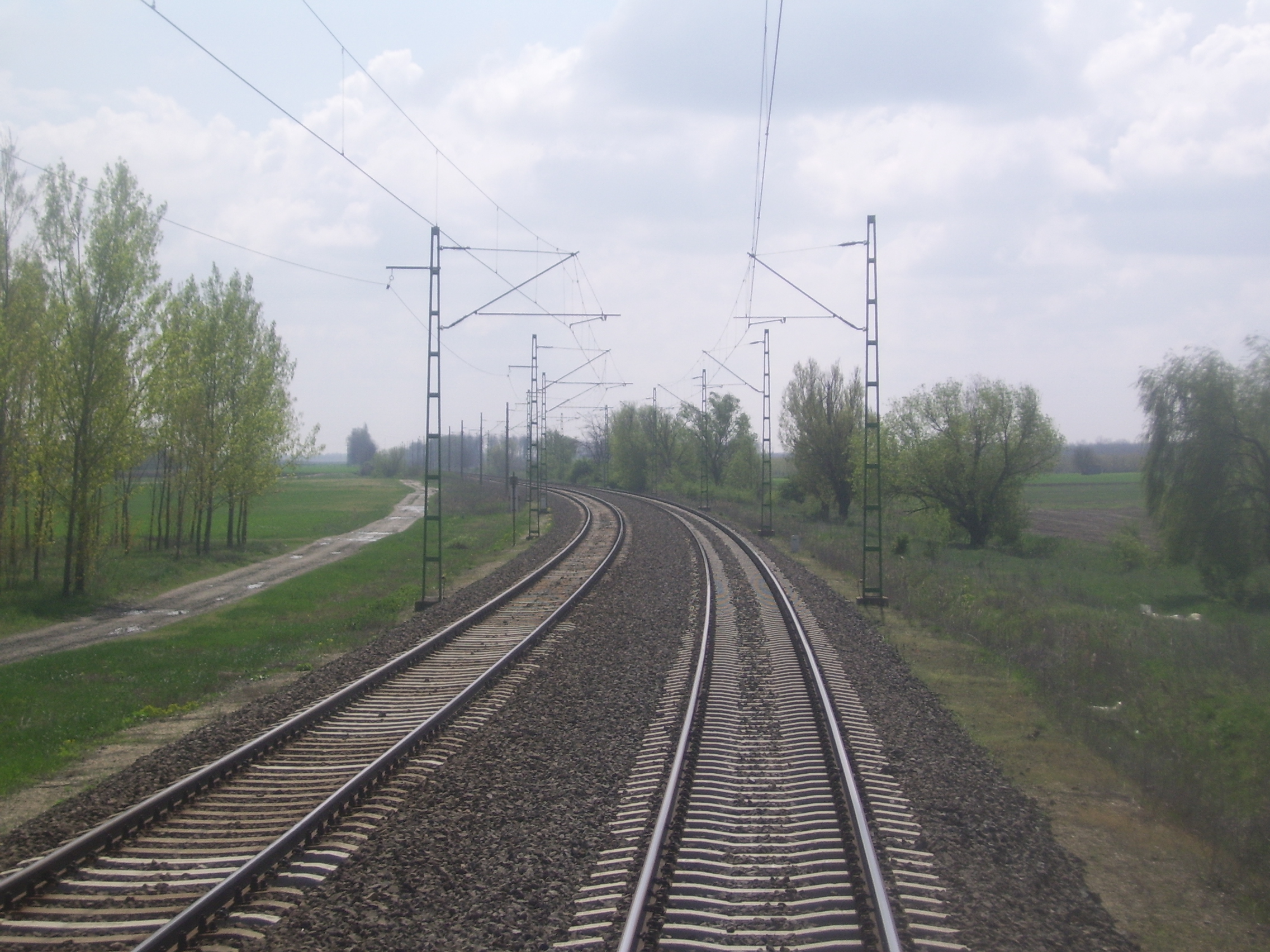
Near Kunszállás with double track

== Railway stations ==
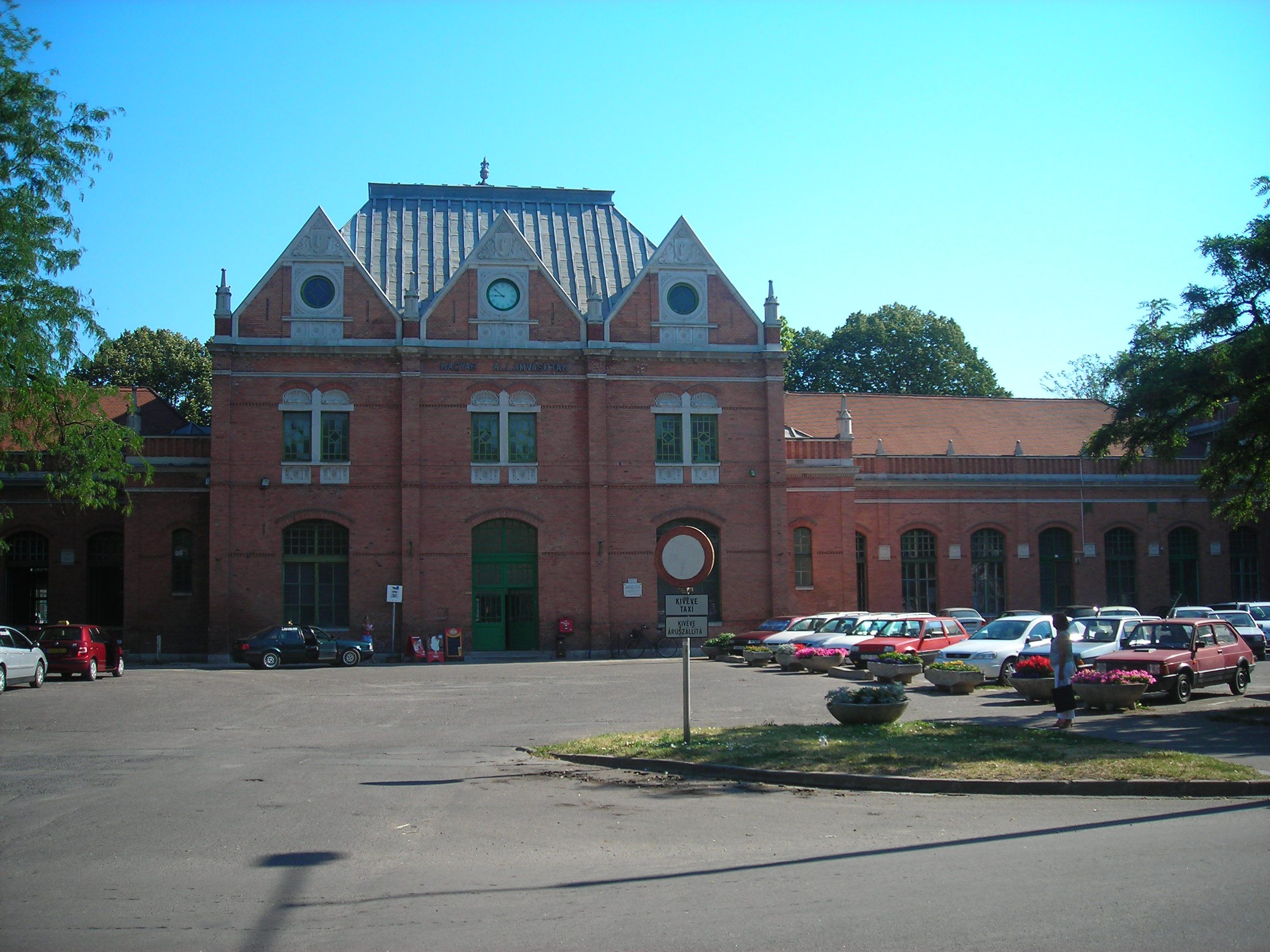
Cegléd railway station

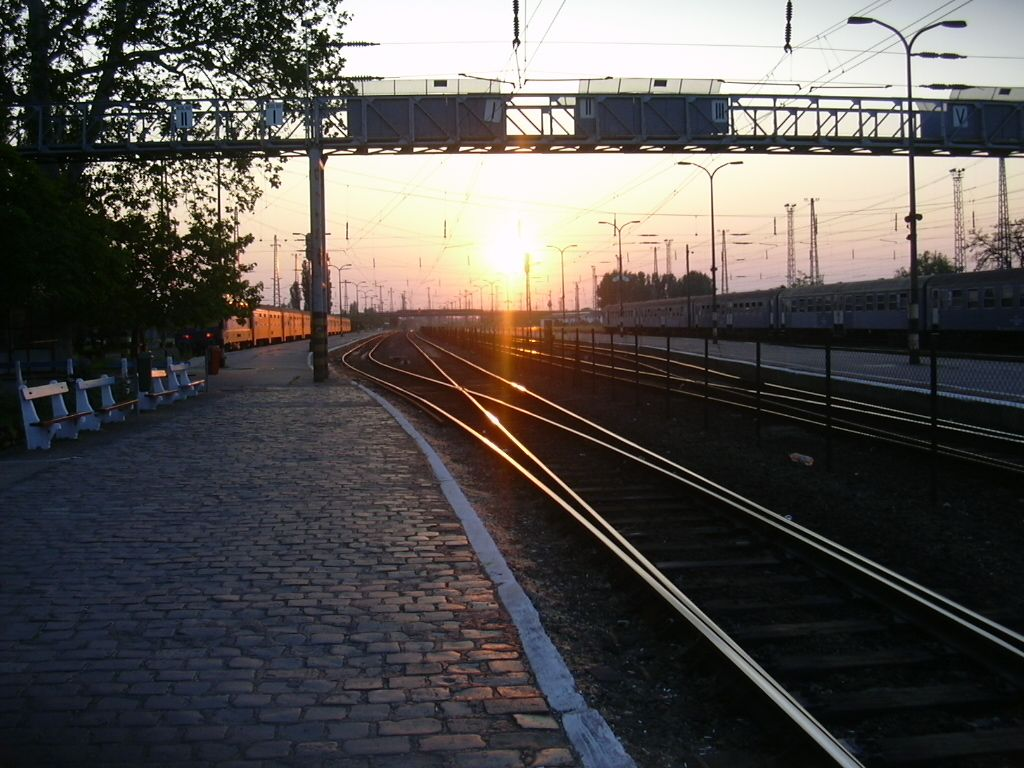
Cegléd railway station before renovation

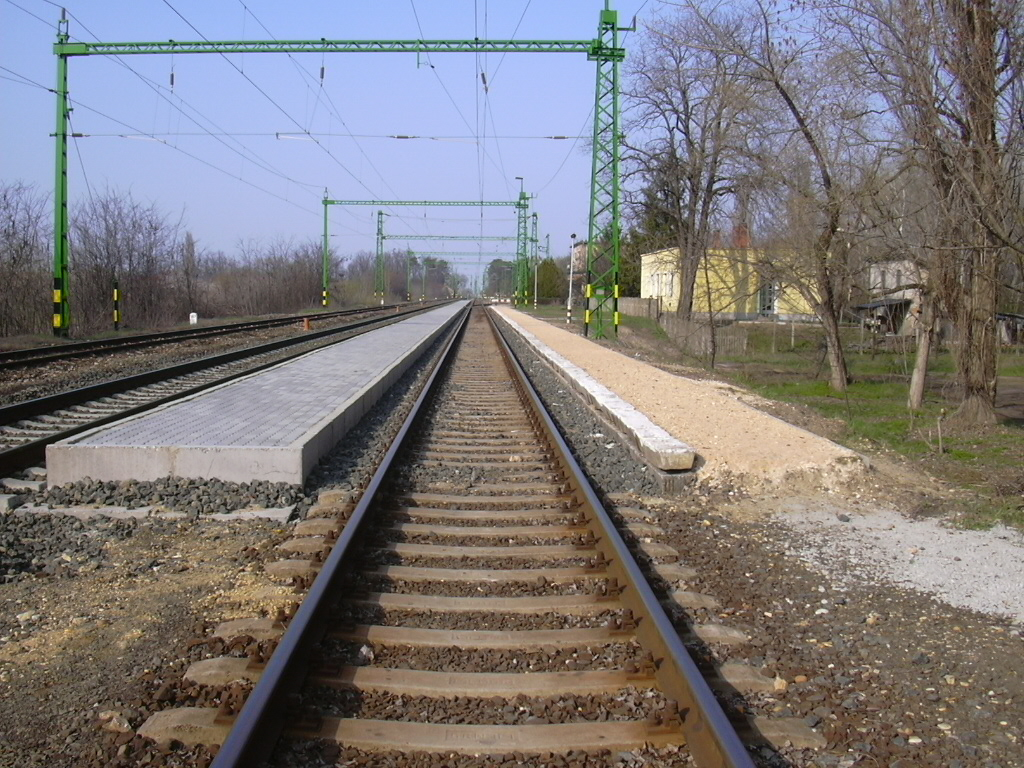
Katonatelep railway station (winter picture)

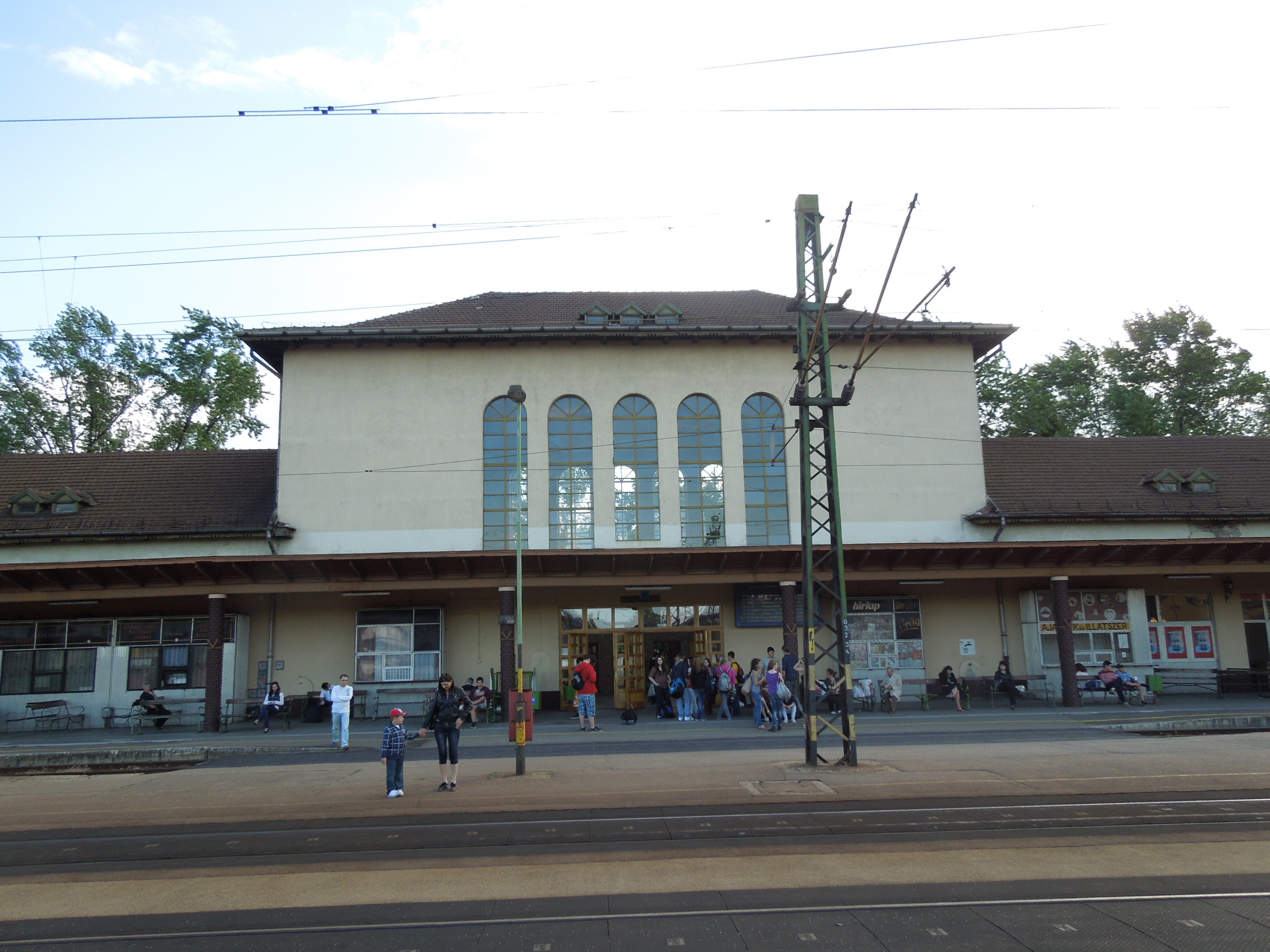
Kecskemét railway station

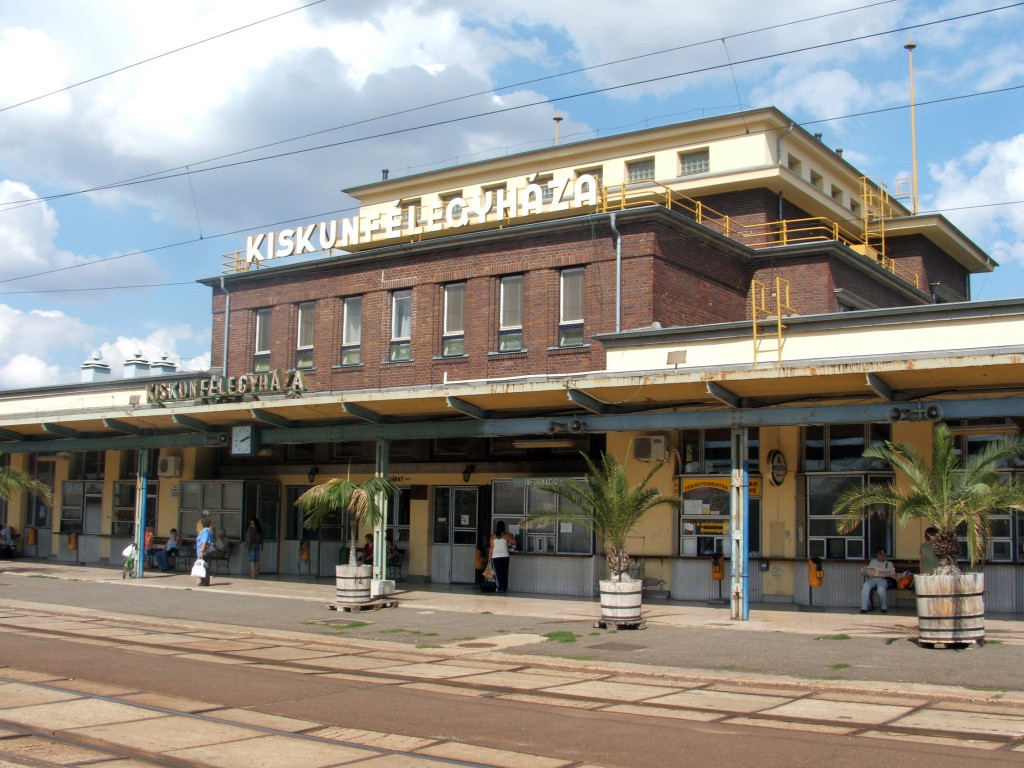
Kiskunfélegyháza railway station

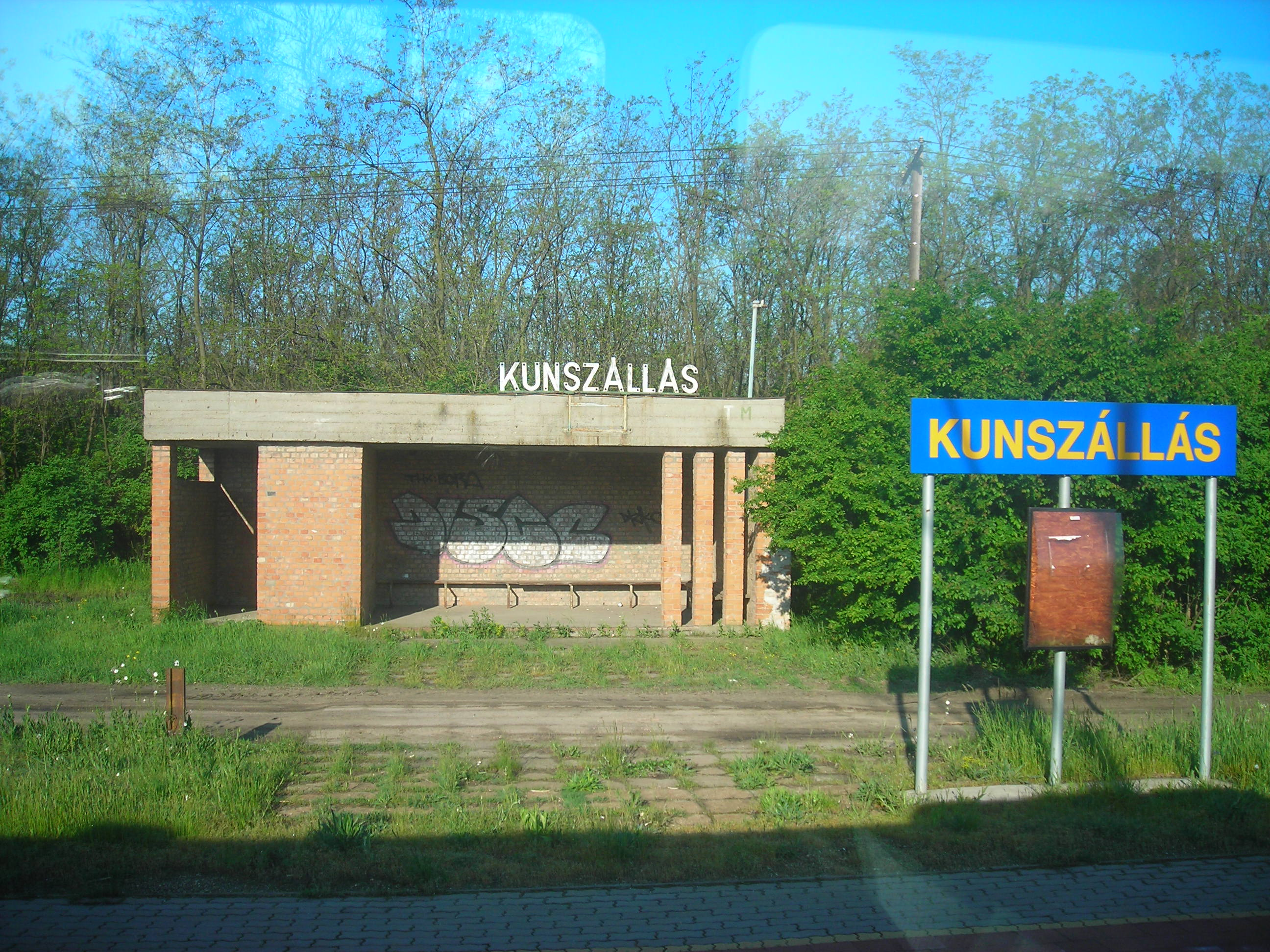
Kunszállás train stop

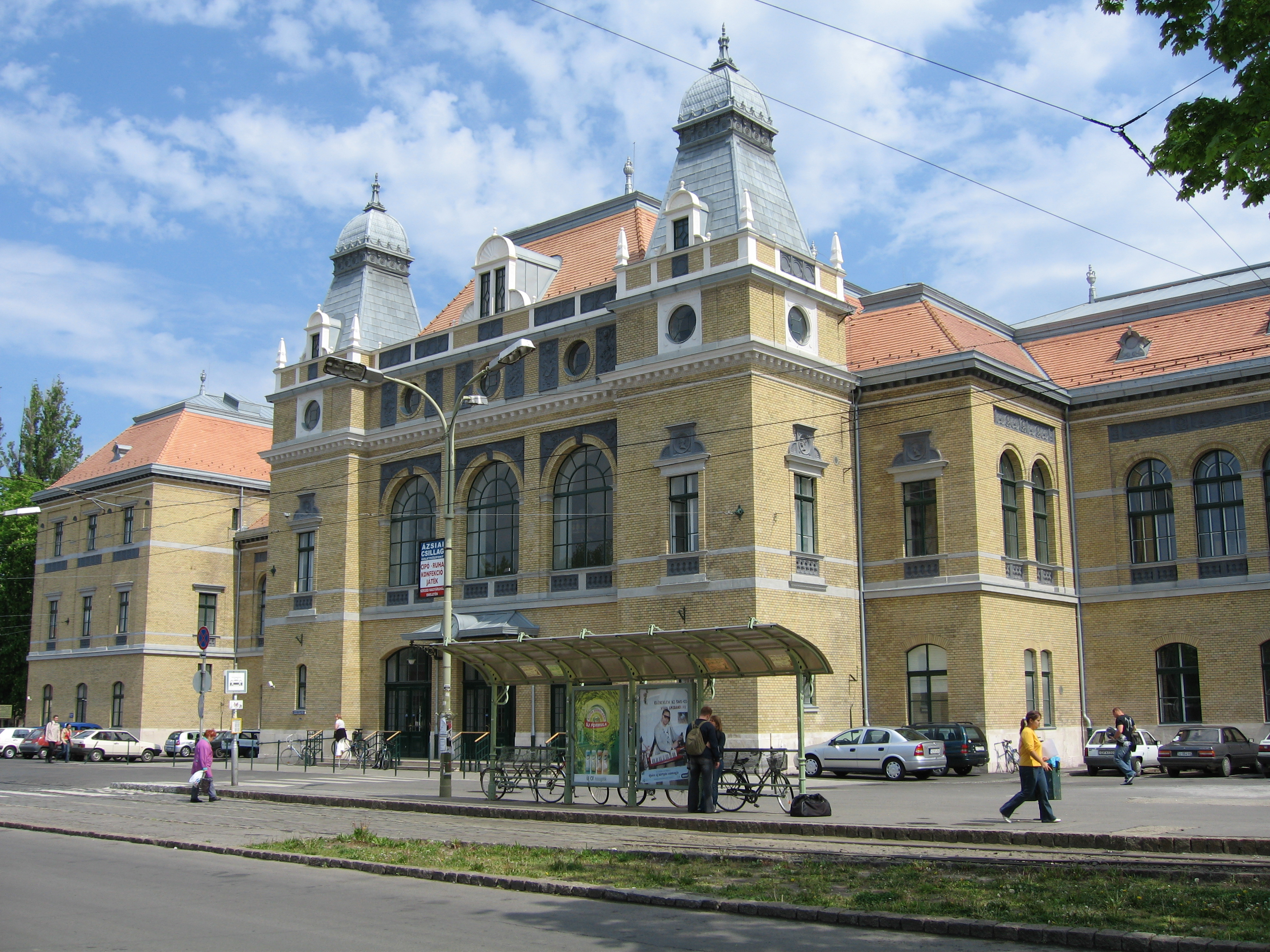
Szeged railway station
