= Fülöpszállás =

Village in Bács-Kiskun, Hungary

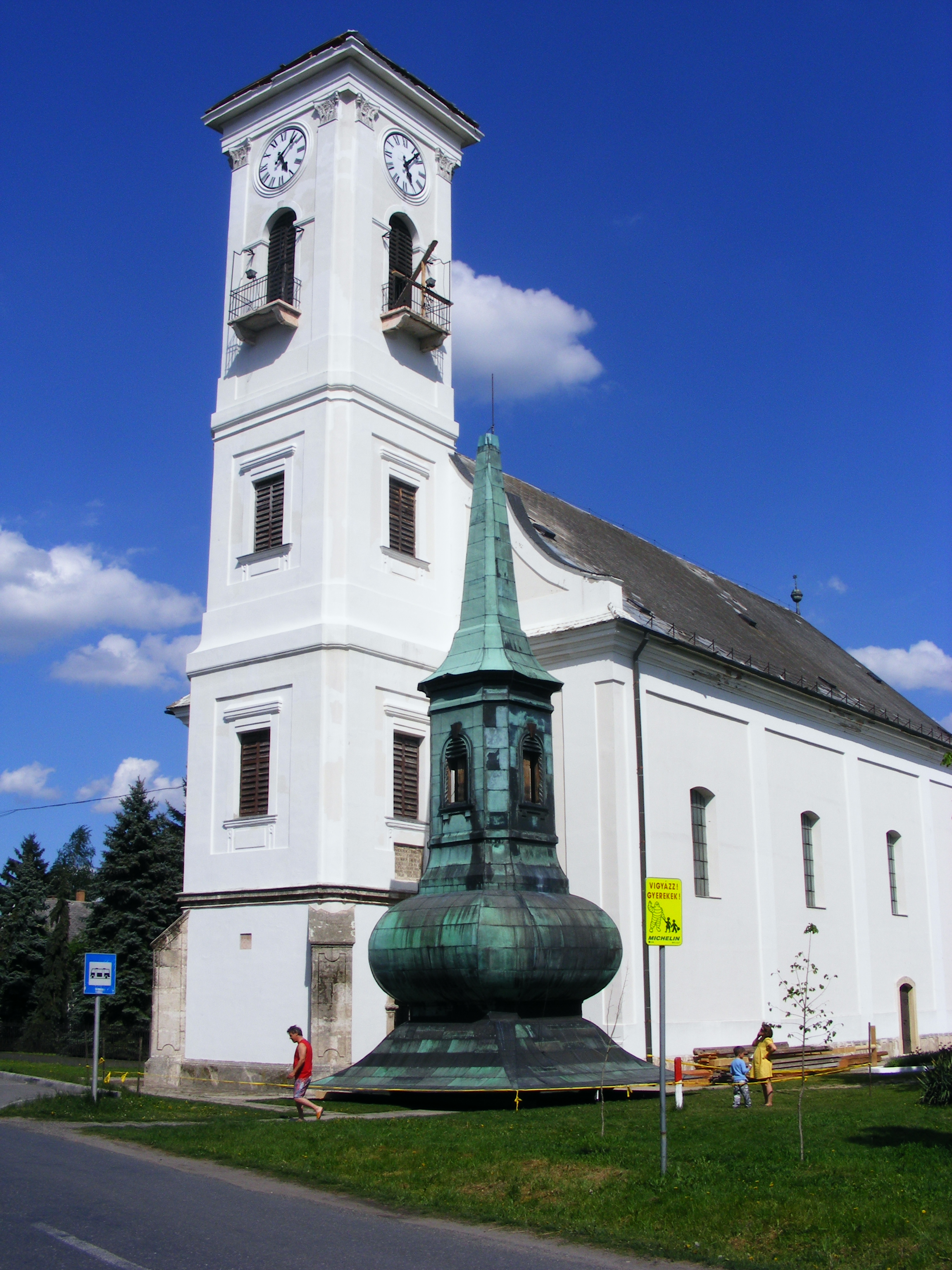
- Fülöpszállás Reformed Parish during a 2004 renovation with its steeple resting on the ground.

- Flag Coat of arms

- Location within Bács-Kiskun County Location within Hungary Location within Europe
- Coordinates: 46°49′15.6″N 19°14′6″E
- Country: Hungary
- County: Bács-Kiskun
- District: Kiskőrös

Area
  - Total: 104.94 km^{2} (40.52 sq mi)

Population (2025)
  - Total: 2,255
- Time zone: UTC+1 (CET)
  - Summer (DST): UTC+2 (CEST)
- Postal code: 6085
- Area code: 78

Fülöpszállás is a village in Bács-Kiskun county, in the Southern Great Plain region of southern Hungary.

== Geography ==
It covers an area of 104.94 km^{2} (41 sq mi) and had a population of 1657 people as of 2005.

== Gallery ==
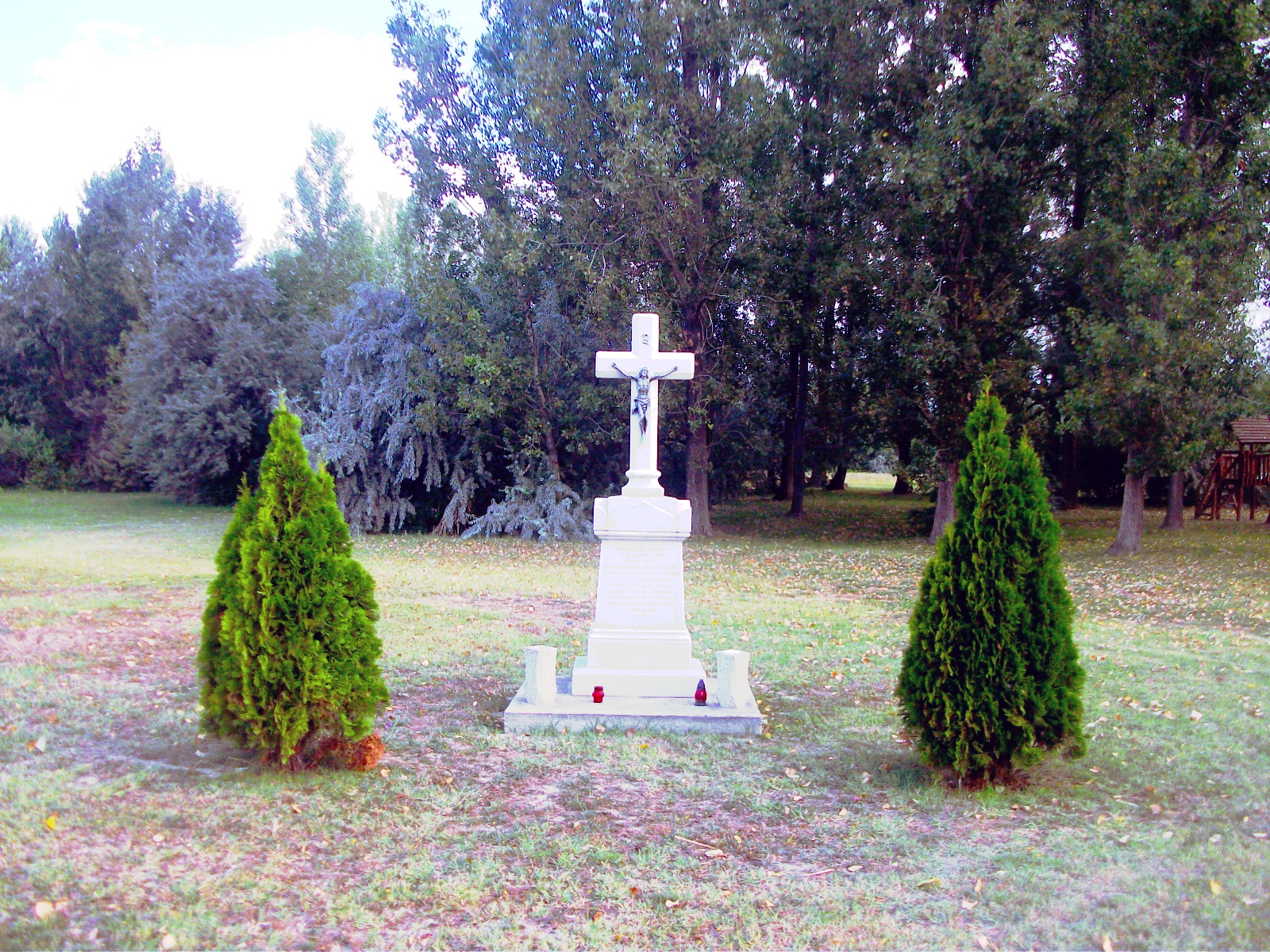

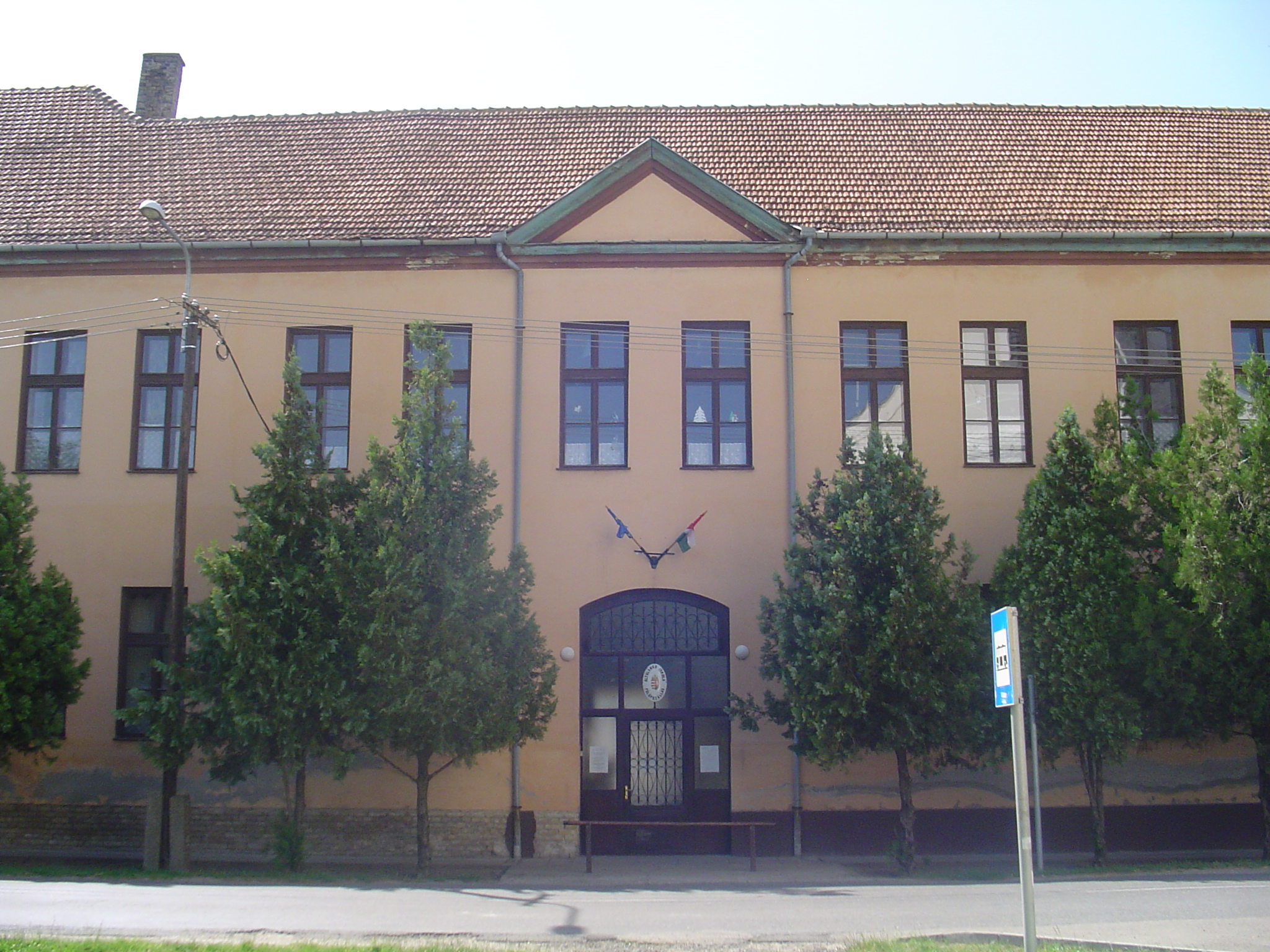
Primary school

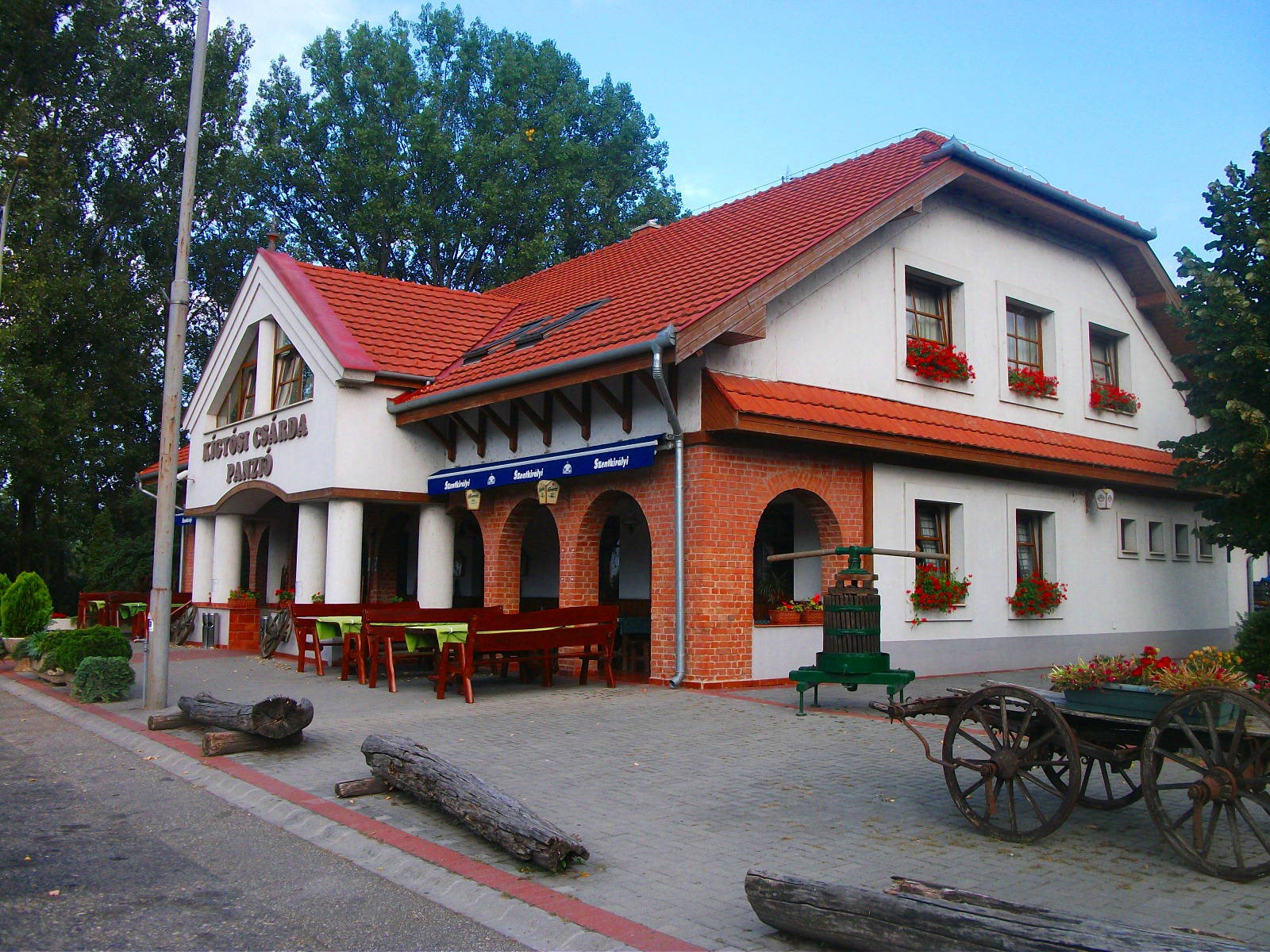
Kígyósi Csárda

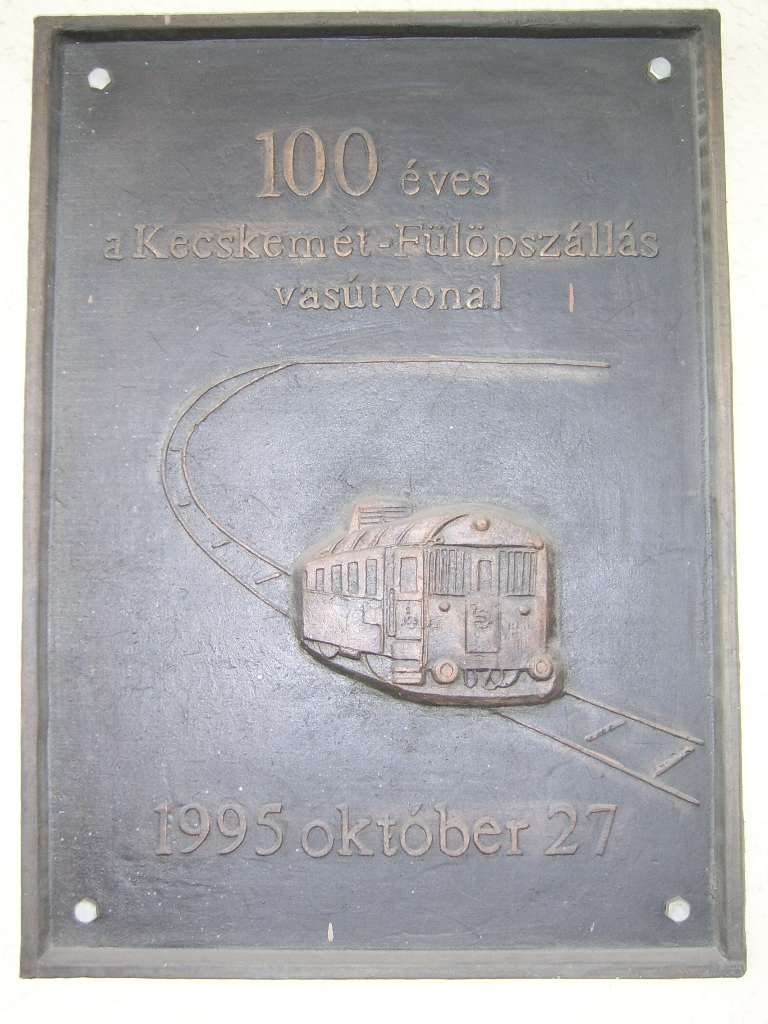
Kecskemet-Fülöpszállás railway plaque

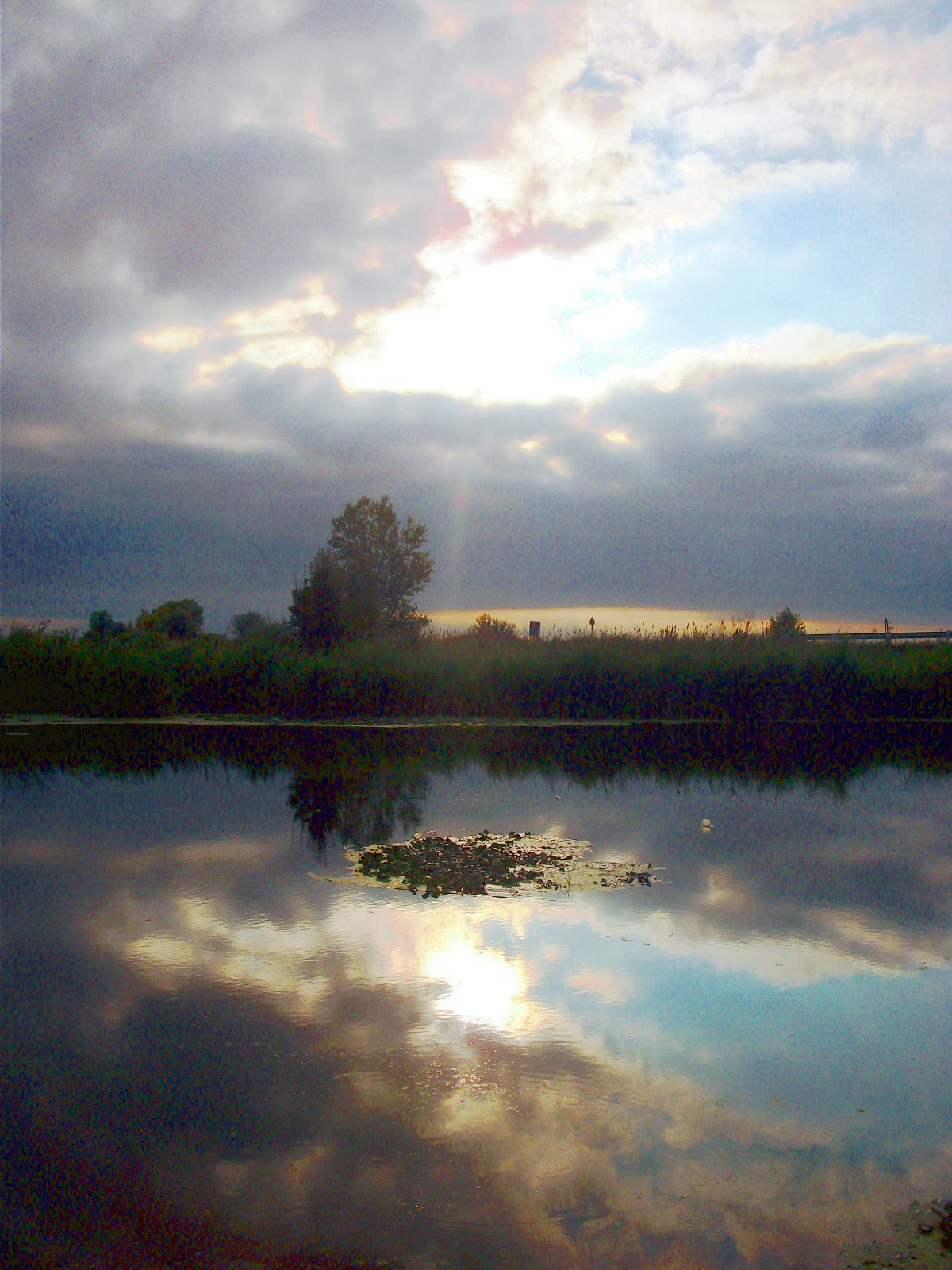

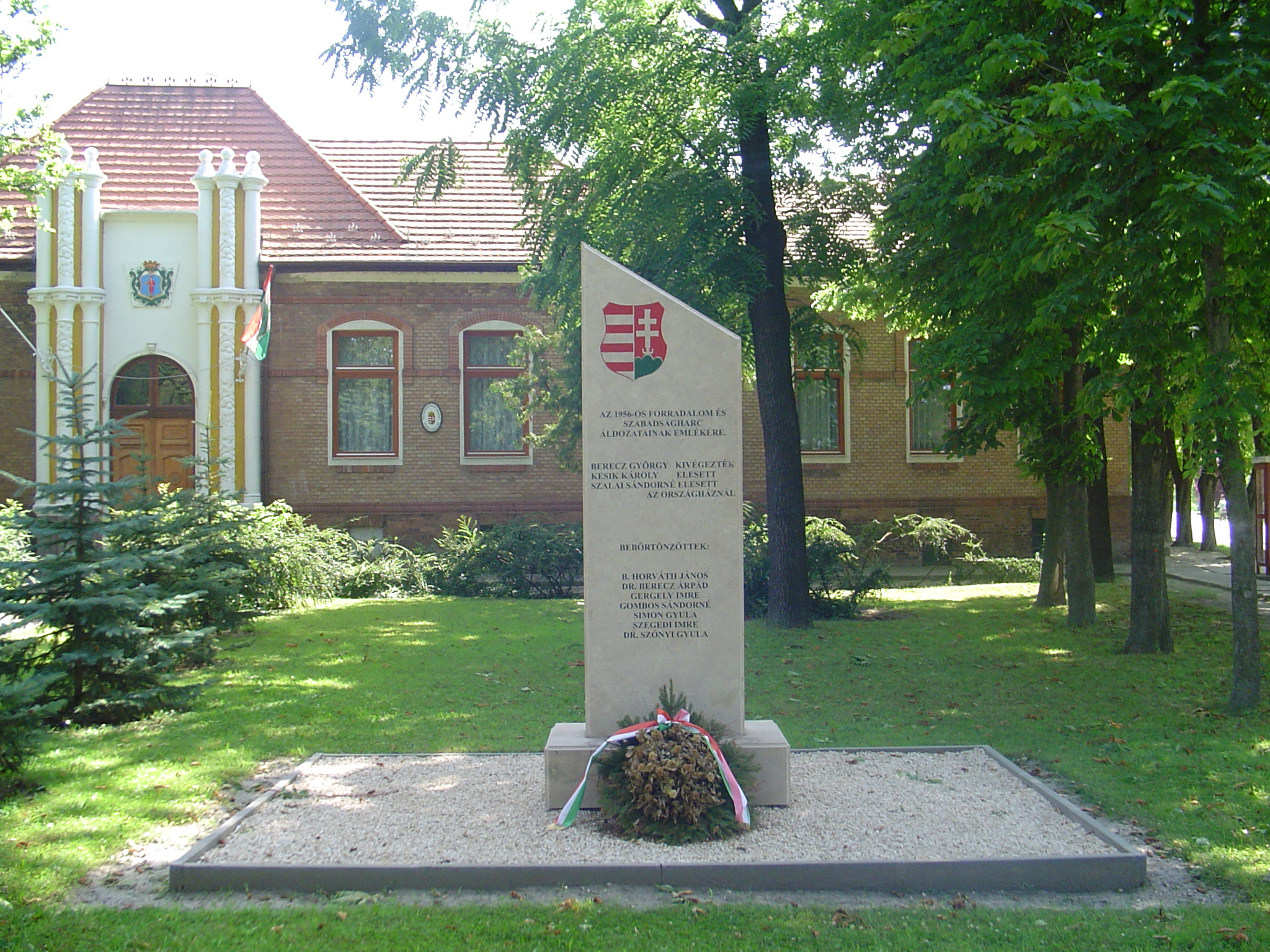
Monument of hungarian revolution of 1956
