= Gemenc State Forest Railway =

Hungarian forest railway within a national park

Overview
- Headquarters: Pörböly
- Locale: Hungary
- Dates of operation: –date
- Successor: Operational

Technical
- Track gauge: 760 mm (2 ft 5 15/16 in)
- Length: 32 kilometres (20 mi)

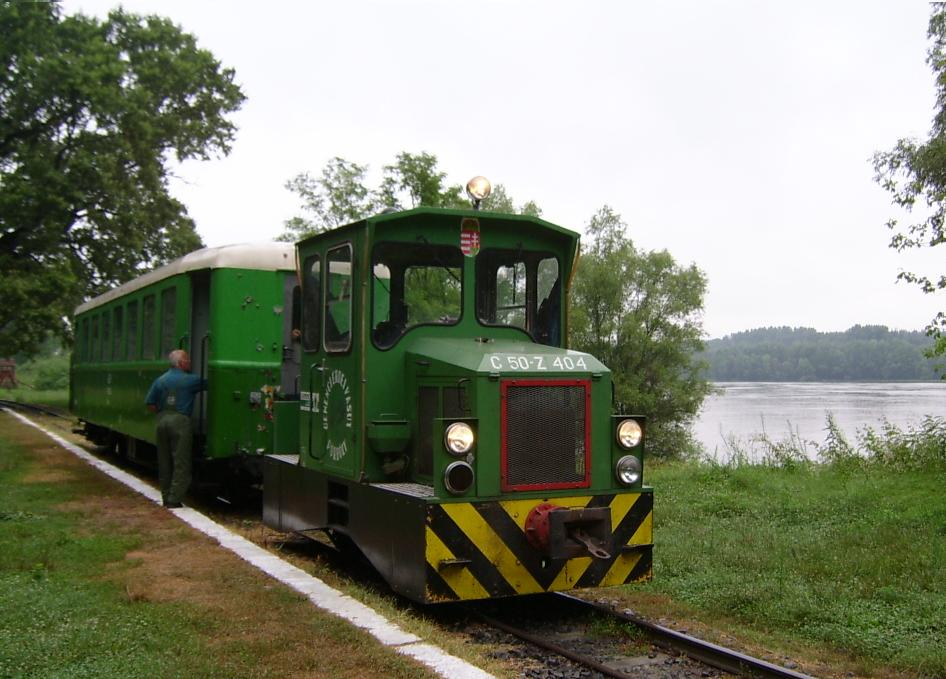
A C50-Z narrow gauge locomotive in Gemenc State Forest

The Gemenc State Forest Railway (Hungarian: Gemenci Állami Erdei Vasút) is a 760 mm gauge railway in Hungary. It runs for 32 km within the Danube-Drava National Park.

In the 2022 and 2023 schedule years, trains will only run between Pörböly and Malomtelelő.
