= Boba, Hungary =

Boba
- Flag Coat of arms

- Location of Boba, Hungary
- Coordinates: 47.18177°N 17.18820°E
- Country: Hungary
- County: Vas

Area
  - Total: 10.95 km^{2} (4.23 sq mi)

Population (2001)
  - Total: 846
  - Density: 77.26/km^{2} (200.1/sq mi)
- Time zone: UTC+1 (CET)
  - Summer (DST): UTC+2 (CEST)
- Postal code: 9542
- Area code: 95

Boba is a village in Vas County, Hungary.
