= Szalkszentmárton =

Coordinates: 46°58′N 19°01′E

- Coat of arms
- Interactive map of Szalkszentmárton
- Country: Hungary
- County: Bács-Kiskun

Area
  - Total: 82.1 km^{2} (31.7 sq mi)

Population (2024)
  - Total: 2,814
  - Density: 34/km^{2} (88/sq mi)
- Time zone: UTC+1 (CET)
  - Summer (DST): UTC+2 (CEST)
- Postal code: 6086
- Area code: 76

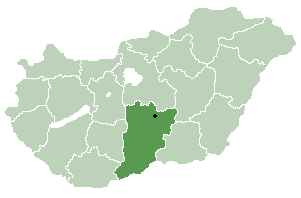
Location of Bács-Kiskun county in the Southern Great Plain region

Szalkszentmárton is a village and municipality in Bács-Kiskun county, in the Southern Great Plain region of southern Hungary.

== Geography ==
It covers an area of 82.1 km^{2} (32 sq mi) and has a population of 2814 people (2024).
