= Pörböly =

- Location of Tolna county in Hungary

- Location within Hungary
- Coordinates: 46°12′21″N 18°48′48″E
- Country: Hungary
- County: Tolna

Government
  - Mayor: Sipos Lajos (Fidesz–KDNP)

Area
  - Total: 11.1 km^{2} (4.3 sq mi)

Population (2022)
  - Total: 515
  - Density: 46.4/km^{2} (120/sq mi)
- Time zone: UTC+1 (CET)
  - Summer (DST): UTC+2 (CEST)
- Postal code: 7142
- Area code: 74
- Website: www.porboly.hu

Pörböly is a village in Tolna County, southern Hungary.

== Geography ==
The village lies in an agricultural flatland some 90 m above the sea level, 9 kilometres in the eastern direction is the river Danube and the town of Baja. Some 66 km ESE is Serbian town of Subotica.

The floodplain forest belt along the Danube river, the Gemenc nature reserve, starts beyond the village with many oxbow lakes, canals and distributaries. Bird observation places can be reached from here.

== Transport ==
Hungarian highway M6 passes the town Bátaszék 9 km westwards. State road Nr. 55 goes through the village as well as a railway connecting Bátaszék and Kiskunhalas, both tracks cross the Danube eastwards to the town of Baja via the Türr István Híd what is the Hungarian southernmost Danube bridge.

At the Pörböly railway station a narrow-gauge Bosnian gauge railway starts directing through the Danube forests northwards, the Gemenc State Forest Railway.
