= Szabadbattyán =

- Large village
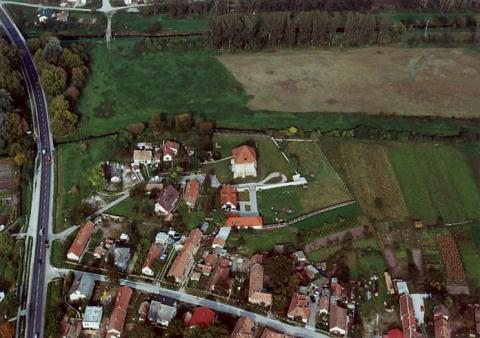
- Aerial photography of Szabadbattyán

- Flag Coat of arms

- Location of Fejér county in Hungary

- Location of Szabadbattyán
- Coordinates: 47.11798°N 18.36290°E
- Country: Hungary
- County: Fejér
- District: Székesfehérvár

Area
  - Total: 33.66 km^{2} (13.00 sq mi)

Population (2004)
  - Total: 4,562
  - Density: 135.53/km^{2} (351.0/sq mi)
- Time zone: UTC+1 (CET)
  - Summer (DST): UTC+2 (CEST)
- Postal code: 8151
- Area code: (+36) 22
- Motorways: M7
- Distance from Budapest: 72 km (45 mi) Northeast

Szabadbattyán is a large village in Fejér county, Hungary. Located about 10 km from Székesfehérvár and about 30 km from Lake Balaton. The area has been inhabited since prehistoric times. Archeological record go back to the Bronze Age. Due to its location it is an important transport hub.

It is famous in Hungary for its confectionery and buildings that range from a cathedral to old fashionable churches.
