= Almamellék =

Almamellék Mamelik (in Croatian) Homeli (in German)
- Village
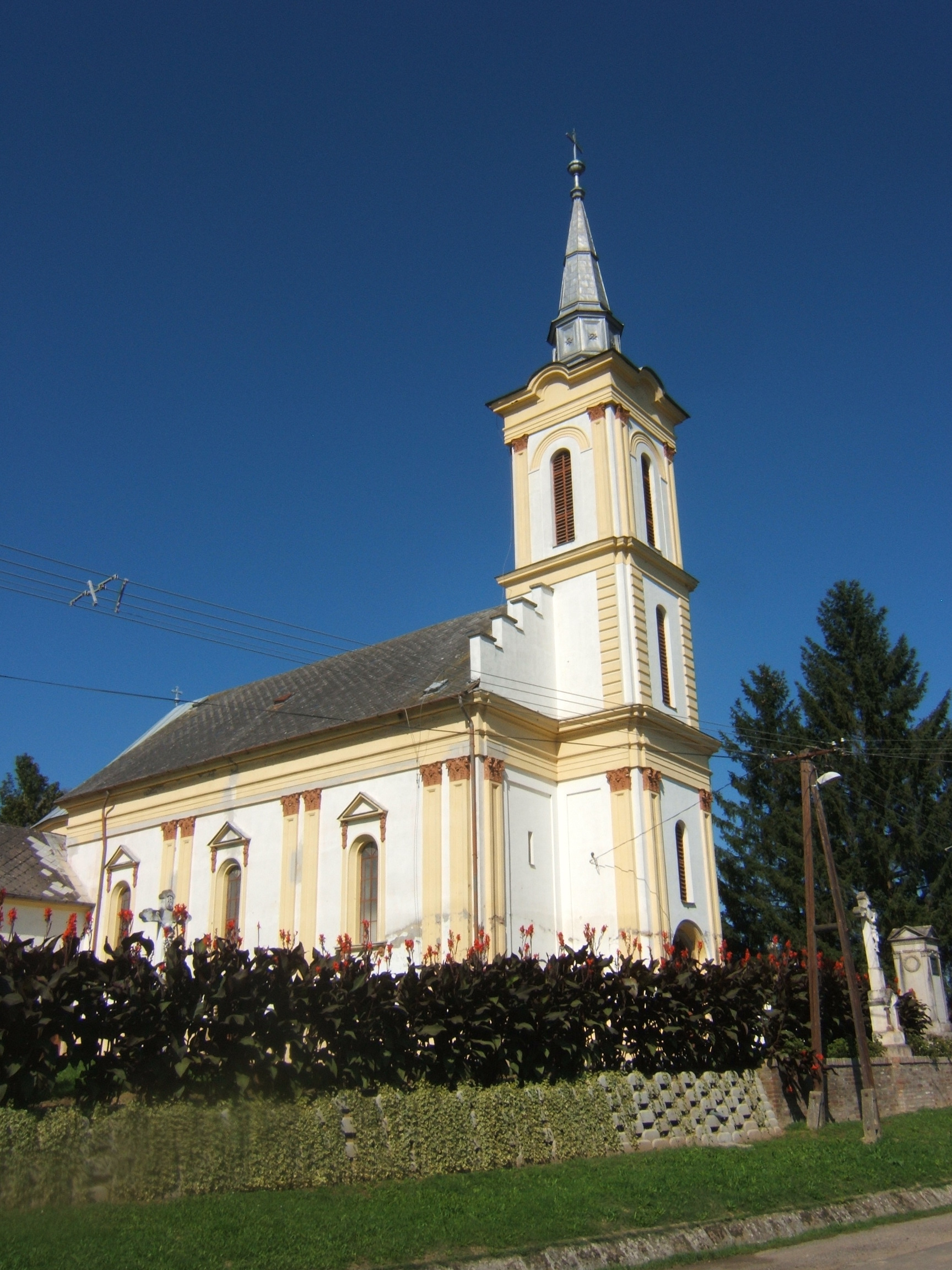

- Flag Coat of arms

- Location of Almamellék
- Coordinates: 46.16157°N 17.87913°E
- Country: Hungary
- Region: Southern Transdanubia
- County: Baranya
- District: Szigetvár

Area
  - Total: 44.33 km^{2} (17.12 sq mi)

Population (1 January 2026)
  - Total: 373
  - Density: 8.41/km^{2} (21.8/sq mi)
- Time zone: UTC+1 (CET)
  - Summer (DST): UTC+2 (CEST)
- Postal code: 7934
- Area code: (+36) 73
- Website: www.almamellek.hu

Almamellék (German: Homeli) is a village in Baranya County, Hungary.
