= Szolnok railway station =

Railway station in Szolnok, Hungary

Szolnok
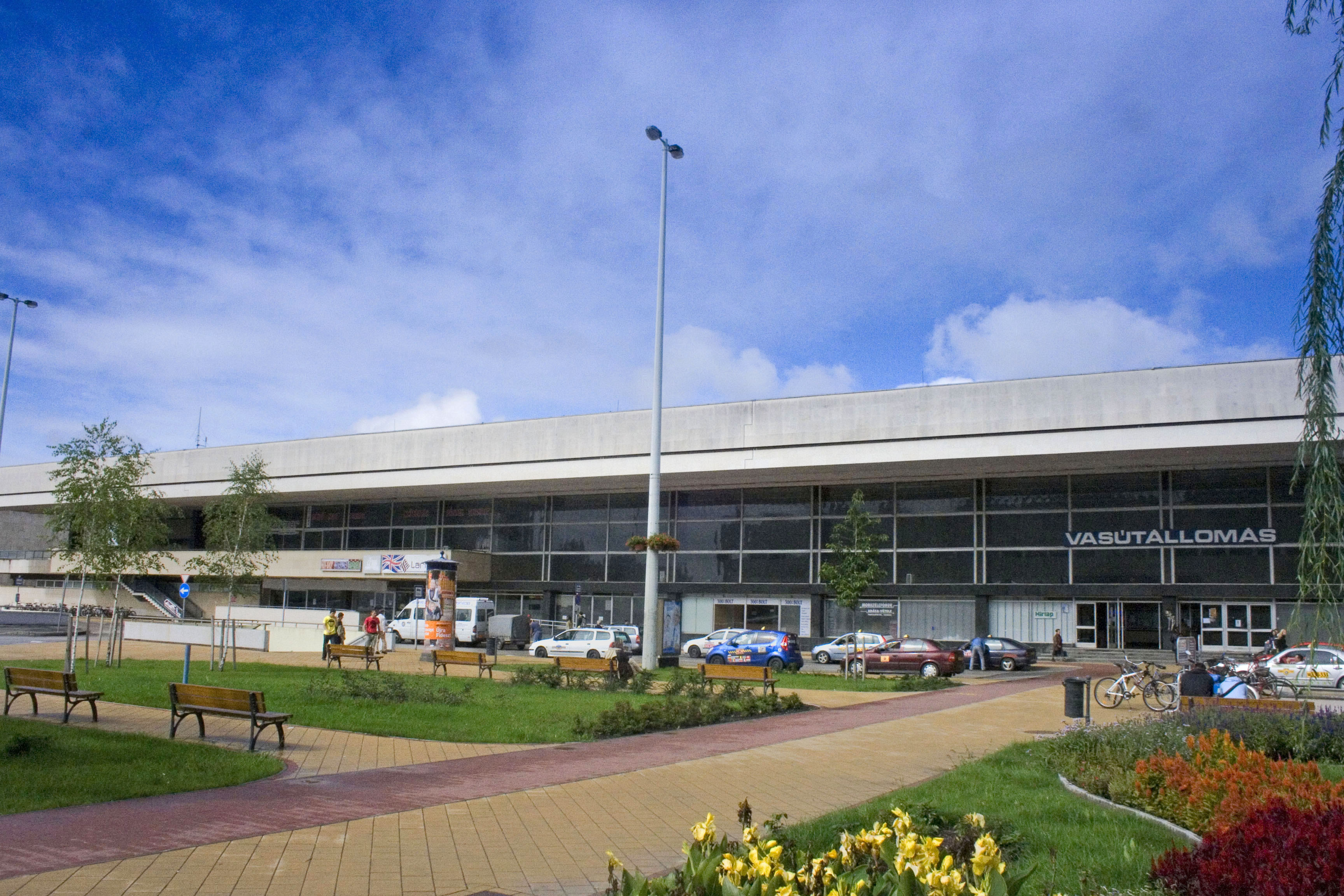
- View of the station building

General information
- Location: Jubileum tér 1-3. 5000 Szolnok; Hungary
- Coordinates: 47°10′42.2″N 20°10′32.8″E
- System: Magyar Államvasutak
- Owner: Hungarian State Railways
- Lines: Hatvan–Szolnok (Line 82); Vámosgyörk–Újszász–Szolnok (Line 86); Budapest–Újszász–Szolnok (Line 120a); Szolnok–Debrecen–Nyíregyháza–Záhony (Line 100); Szolnok–Békéscsaba–Lőkösháza (Line 120); Szolnok–Hódmezővásárhely–Makó (Line 130); Budapest–Cegléd–Szolnok (Line 100a); Szolnok–Kiskunfélegyháza (Line 145)
- Platforms: 16
- Connections: Bus

Construction
- Architect: Vilmos Schneller

History
- Opened: 1975
Services
Preceding station	MÁV START	Following station
Cegléd towards Budapest Nyugati	InterCity	Püspökladány towards Budapest Keleti via Tokaj
Cegléd towards Budapest Nyugati	InterCity	Püspökladány towards Záhony
Cegléd towards Budapest Nyugati	InterCity	Püspökladány towards Mukachevo
Budapest Keleti Terminus	InterCity	Kétpó towards Arad
Budapest Keleti Terminus	InterCity	Kétpó towards Bucharest North
Budapest Keleti Terminus	InterCity	Mezőtúr towards Békéscsaba
Budapest Keleti Terminus	InterCity	Törökszentmiklós towards Braşov
Budapest Keleti Terminus	InterCity	Kétpó towards Timişoara Nord
Budapest Keleti towards Wien Hbf	EuroCity	Törökszentmiklós towards Chop
Budapest Keleti towards Wien Hbf	EuroCity	Törökszentmiklós towards Cluj Napoca
Budapest Keleti towards Wien Hbf	Dacia–Corvin Express	Békéscsaba towards Bucharest North
Abony towards Budapest Nyugati	InterRegio	Szajol towards Debrecen
Tószeg towards Kecskemét	S220	Terminus
Abony towards Kecskemét	S225	Terminus
Zagyvarékas towards Hatvan	S820	Terminus
Abonyi út towards Vámosgyörk	Személyvonat	Terminus
Terminus	Személyvonat	Szajol towards Szentes
Abony towards Budapest Nyugati	S50	Terminus
Abony towards Budapest Nyugati	G50	Terminus
Abony towards Budapest Nyugati	Z50	Terminus
Zagyvarékas towards Budapest Keleti	G60	Terminus
Zagyvarékas towards Budapest Keleti	Z60	Terminus
Location
- Location within Hungary

Szolnok railway station (Hungarian: Szolnok vasútállomás) is a railway station of the Hungarian State Railways (MÁV) in Szolnok, Hungary. Szolnok is a major railway junction, with lines branching out in all four cardinal directions.

== Lines ==
Hungarian State Railways designates eight physical lines that serve Szolnok, although there are only four distinct routes as some share tracks:

- Hatvan–Szolnok (Line 82), Vámosgyörk–Újszász–Szolnok (Line 86), and Budapest–Újszász–Szolnok (Line 120a) toward Újszász.
- Szolnok–Debrecen–Nyíregyháza–Záhony (Line 100), Szolnok–Békéscsaba–Lőkösháza (Line 120) and Szolnok–Hódmezővásárhely–Makó (Line 130) toward Szajol.
- Budapest–Cegléd–Szolnok (Line 100a) toward Budapest Nyugati.
- Szolnok–Kiskunfélegyháza (Line 145) toward Kiskunfélegyháza.

== Transport ==
- Bus (local): 2Y, 3, 6, 6Y, 7, 7Y, 8, 8Y, 10, 11, 12, 13, 13Y, 15, K15, 16, 17, 21, 24, 24A, 27, 28, 34, 34A, 34E, 38
- Bus (long-distance): 533, 534, 537, 538, 553

== Train services ==
The station is served by the following services:

=== International services ===
EuroCity services – EC

- (Hortobágy) Debrecen – Szolnok – Budapest – Tatabánya – Győr – Wien Westbf

EuroNight services – EN

- (Ister) Bp-Keleti pu. – Szolnok – Békéscsaba – Arad – Deva – Sibiu – Brasov – Ploieşti Vest – București Nord

Int. InterCity services – IC

- (Corona, Hargita) Bp-Keleti pu. – Szolnok – Püspökladány – Oradea – Cluj Napoca – Miercurea Ciuc – Brasov
- (Körös) Bp-Keleti pu. – Szolnok – Békéscsaba – Arad – Timişoara Nord
- (Transsylvania) Bp-Keleti pu. – Szolnok – Békéscsaba – Arad – Deva – Sibiu – Brasov
- (Traianus) Bp-Keleti pu. – Szolnok – Békéscsaba – Arad – Timişoara - Drobeta Tr.Severin – Craiova – București Nord

Int. Express services

- (Dacia) Wien Westbf – Győr – Tatabánya – Bp-Keleti pu. – Szolnok – Békéscsaba – Arad – Deva – Brasov – București Nord

=== Domestic services ===
Intercity services – IC

- (Cívis, Hajdú, Holló, Kócsag, Nyírség, Páva, Rétköz, Rigó, Szabolcs, Vércse)
  Bp-Nyugati pu. – Szolnok – Püspökladány – Hajdúszoboszló – Debrecen – Nyíregyháza
- (Bereg-Kraszna, Ung)
  Bp-Nyugati pu. – Szolnok – Püspökladány – Hajdúszoboszló – Debrecen – Nyíregyháza – Kisvárda – Záhony
- (Takta)
  Bp-Nyugati pu. – Szolnok – Püspökladány – Hajdúszoboszló – Debrecen – Nyíregyháza – Tokaj – Szerencs – Miskolc-Tiszai
- (Alföld, Békés, Csanád, Viharsarok)
  Bp-Keleti pu. – Szolnok – Mezőtúr – Gyoma – Mezőberény – Békéscsaba – Kétegyháza – Lőkösháza

== Distance from other railway stations ==
=== Hungary ===
- Budapest -Nyugati; -Keleti: 100 km
- Békéscsaba: 96 km
- Debrecen: 121 km
- Hatvan: 68 km
- Kiskunfélegyháza: 85 km
- Nyíregyháza: 170 km
- Siófok (via Budapest): 215 km
- Szeged (via Cegléd): 145 km
- Szentes: 74 km
- Vámosgyörk: 88 km

=== Europe ===
- Arad: 153 km
- București Nord: 754 km
- Cluj-Napoca: 299 km
- Kyiv-Pasazhyrskyi: 1129 km
- München Hbf: 840 km
- Praha hl.n: 711 km
- Timișoara Nord: 210 km
- Wien Hbf: 354 km

== Gallery ==
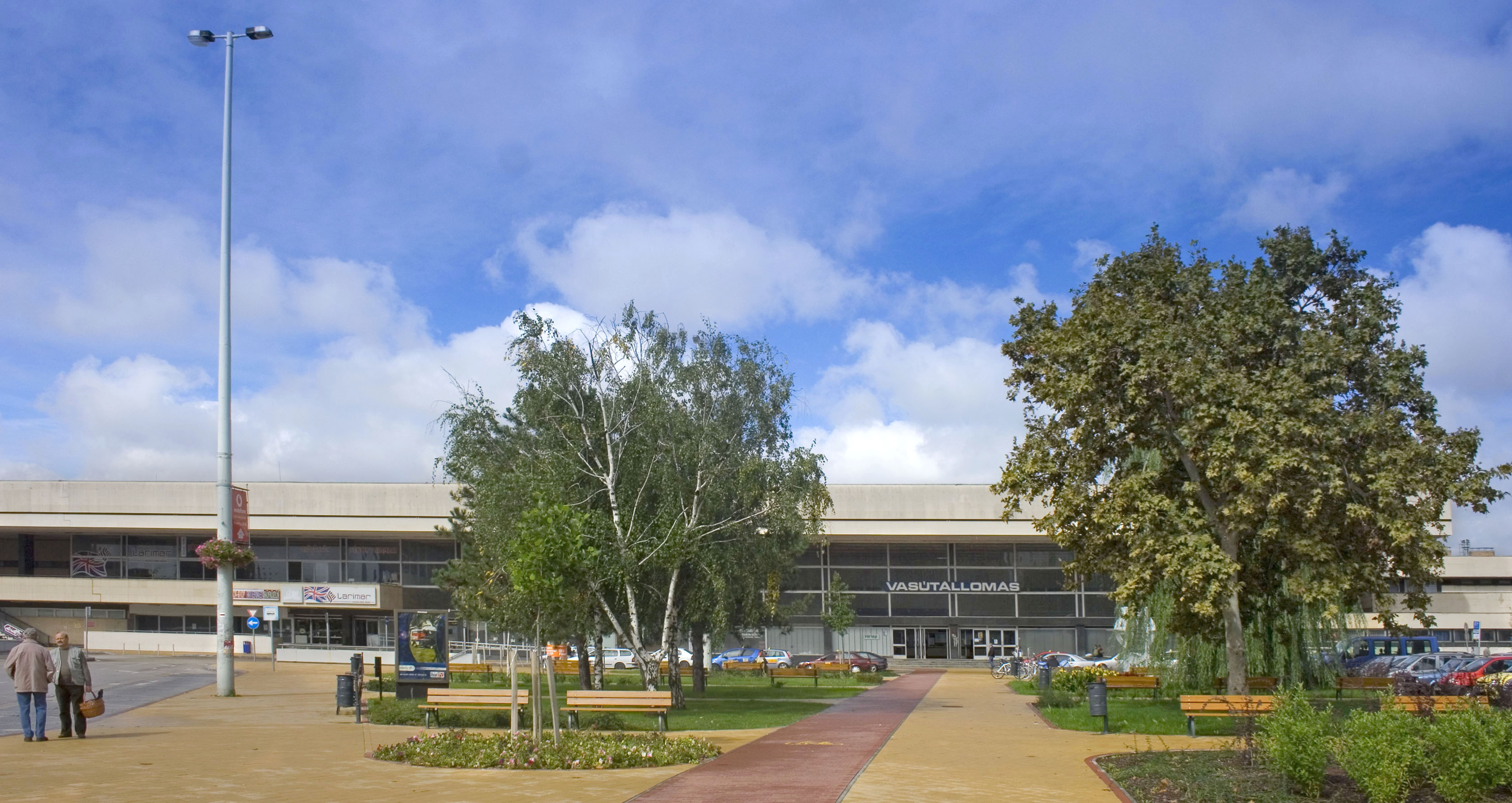
Main entrance

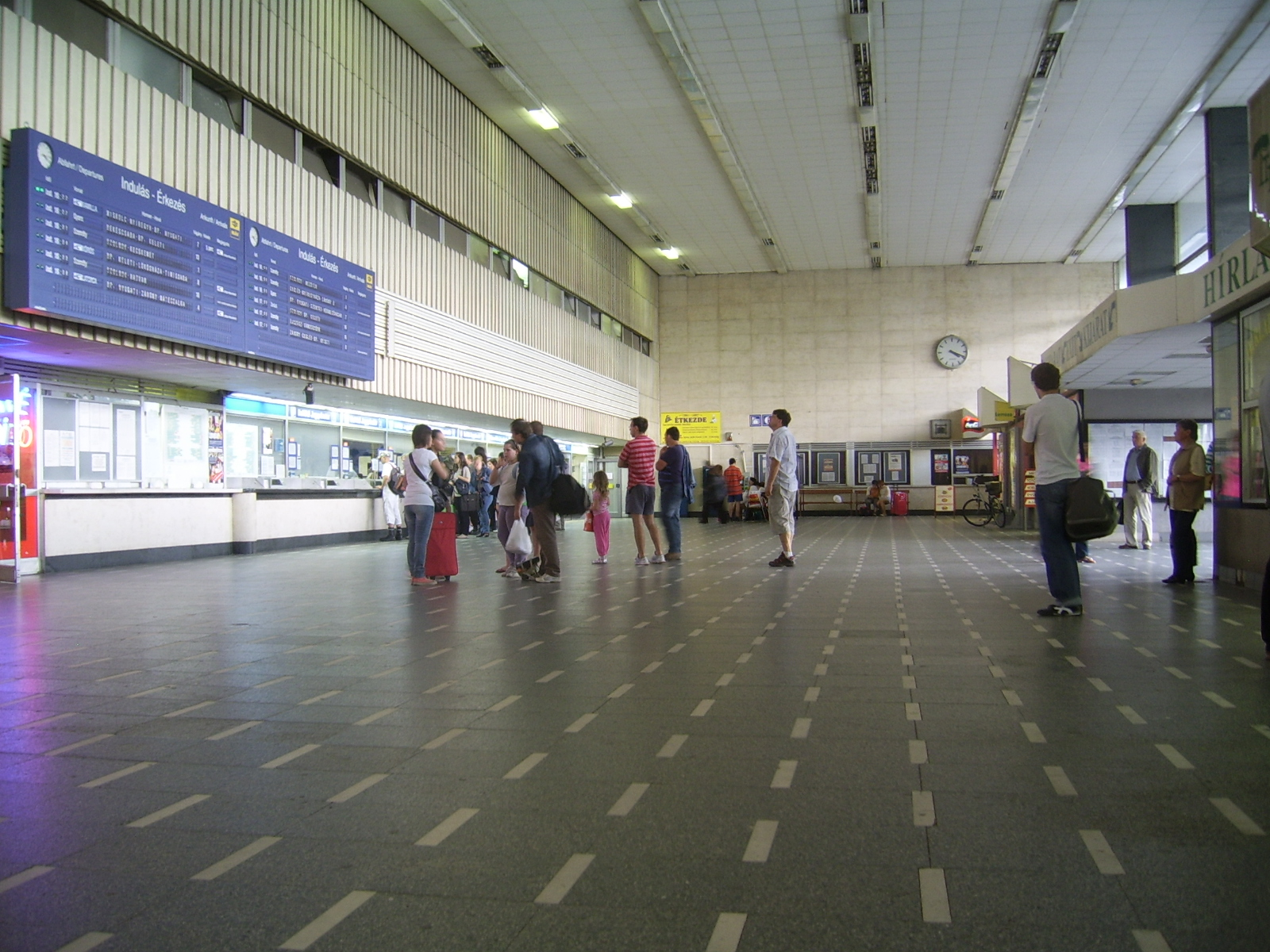
Main hall

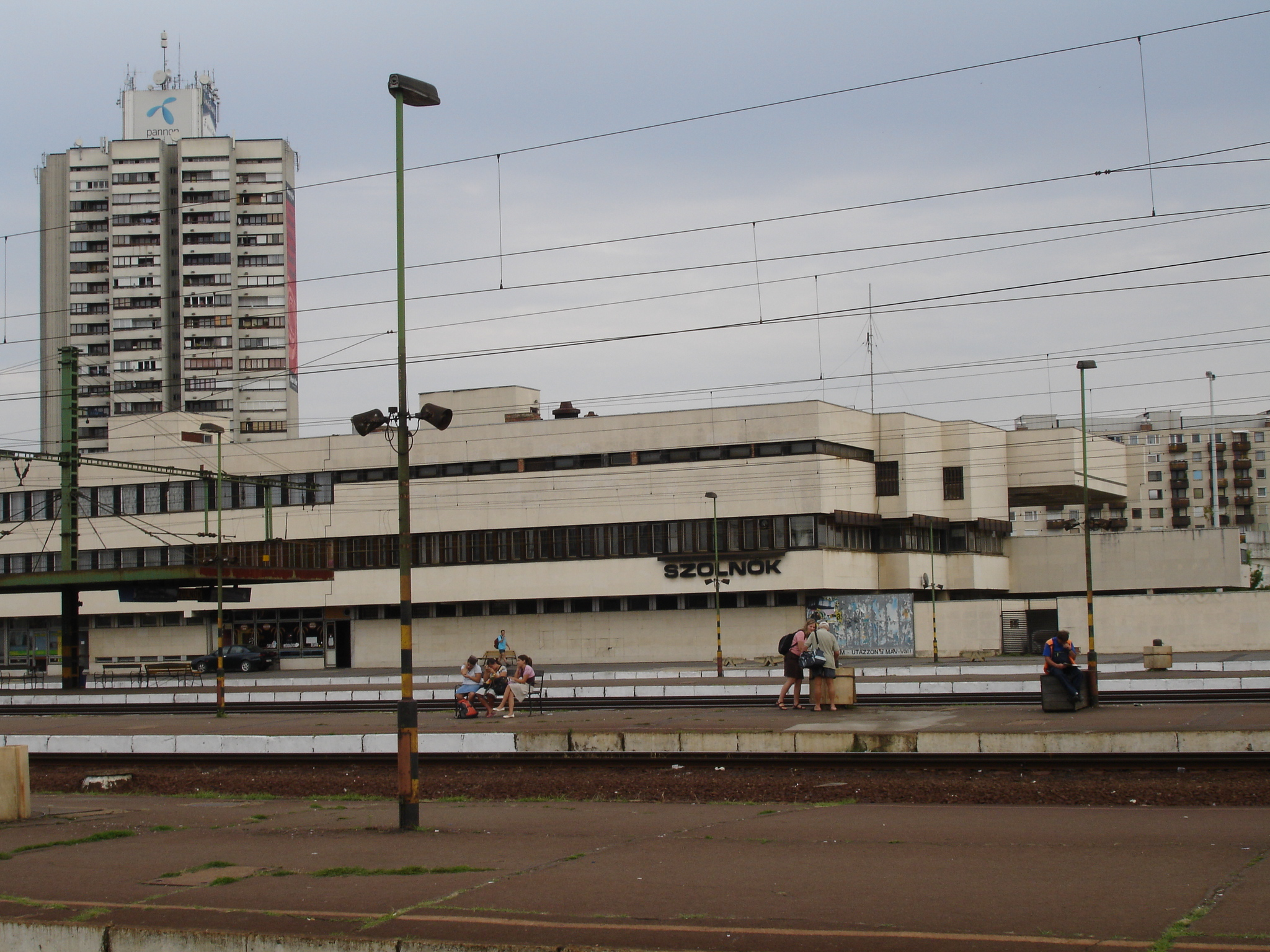
Station view

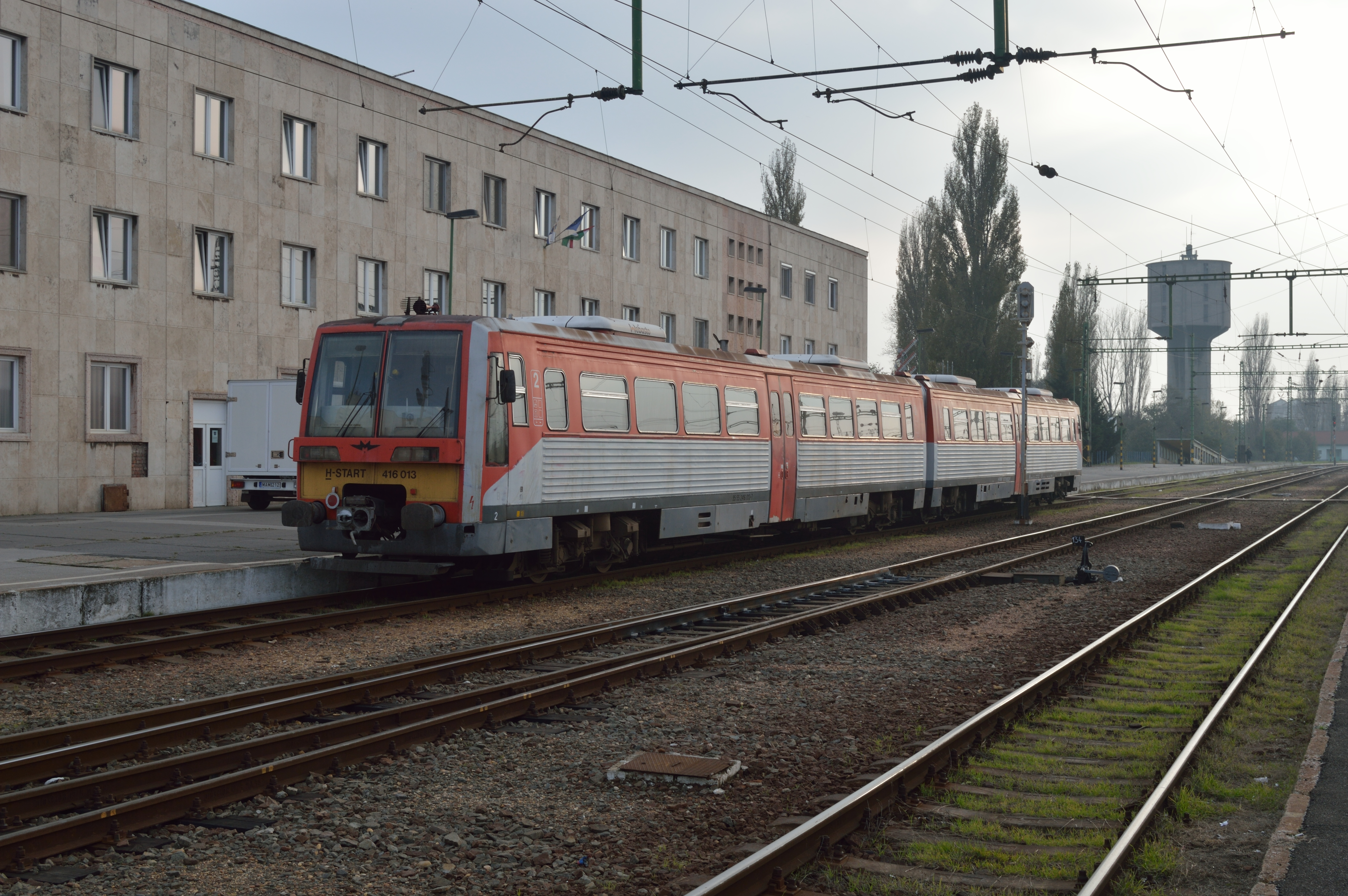

== See also ==
- History of rail transport in Hungary
- Rail transport in Hungary
