= 1873 Pest rail accident =

1873 derailment in Pest, Austria-Hungary

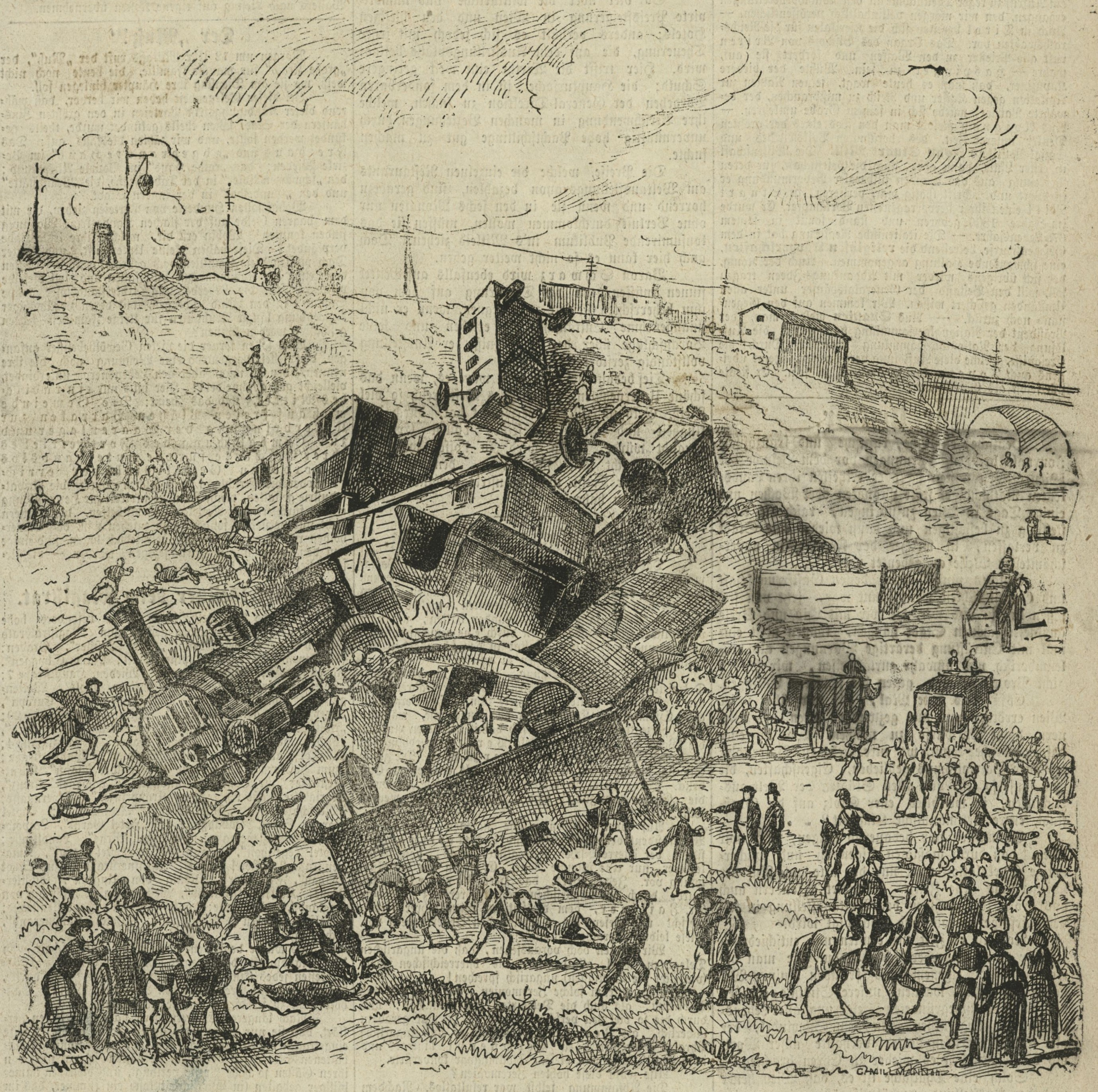
- Railway accident in Pest (Illustrirtes Wiener Extrablatt, 11 May 1873)

Details
- Date: 6 May 1873 c. 11 AM
- Location: Zugló, outskirts of Pest
- Coordinates: 47.515981°N 19.094984°E
- Country: Austria-Hungary
- Line: Budapest-Szolnok railway line
- Operator: Hungarian Central Railway
- Incident type: Derailment
- Cause: Human error

Statistics
- Deaths: 26
- Injured: about 50

The 1873 Pest rail accident occurred on 6 May 1873 in Zugló, on the outskirts of Pest, Budapest, on the Budapest-Szolnok railway line built by the Hungarian Central Railway. A train carrying mostly Slovene railway workers was mistakenly diverted to a section of track under reconstruction, causing it to derail and its carriages to fall down the embankment. The event left 26 people dead and about 50 injured. It was one of the first major rail accidents in the history of rail transport in Hungary.

== Accident ==
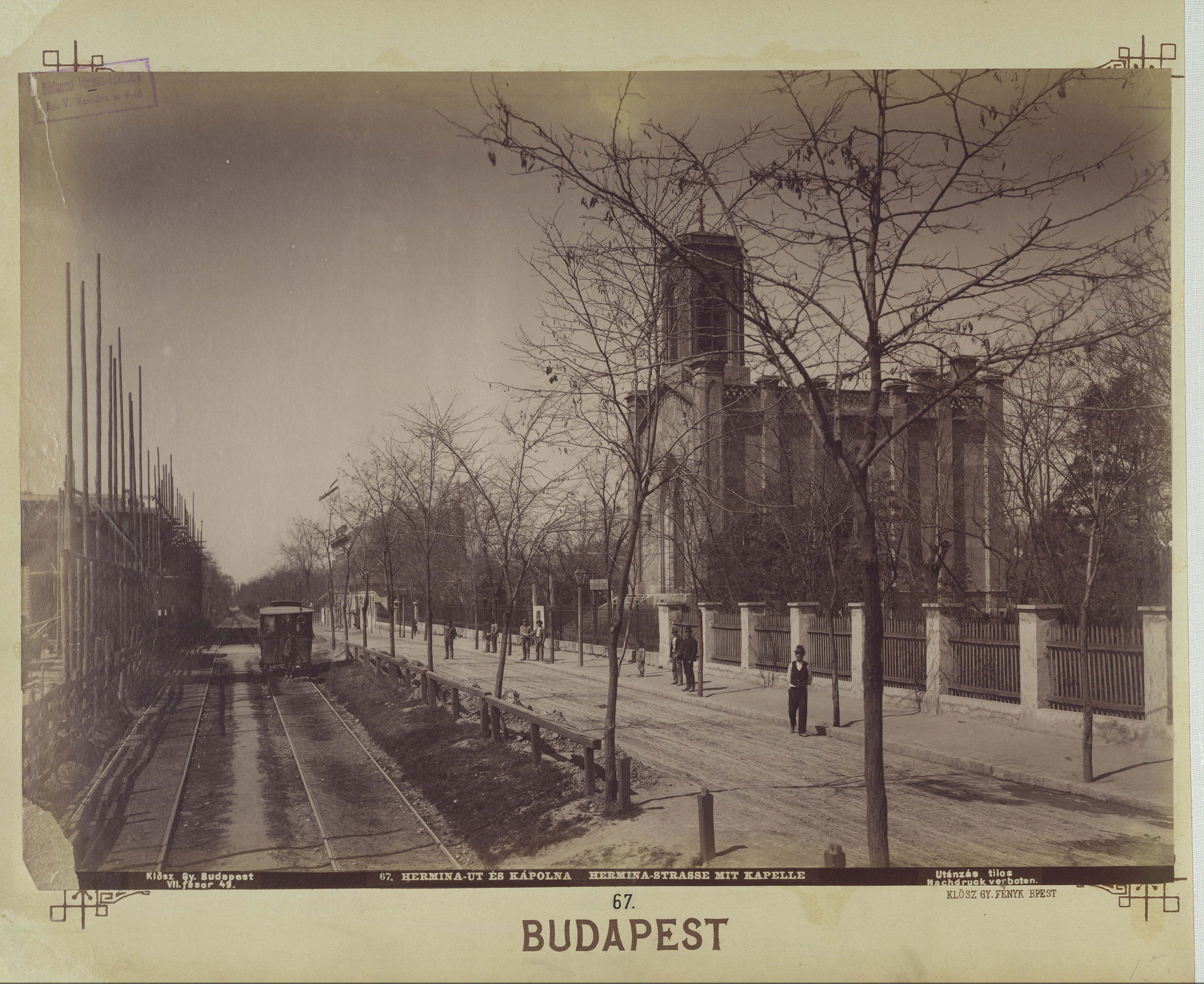
Hermina Chapel in Zugló and its neighborhood in 1895

Late on the morning of Tuesday, 6 May 1873, freight train no. 136 of the Hungarian State Railway, travelling from Szeged to Budapest, approached the Kőbánya station area, southeast of Pest. The train, powered by the Ménes steam locomotive, was carrying about 140 railway labourers from Carniola, mostly of Slovene origin as well as a few Italians. It also included some freight wagons, with some wagons loaded with sheep. As it approached, the train was not warned of the construction area, and local station staff routed it onto an unfinished dead-end track. At City Park (Városliget) near the Hermina Chapel, about 1–2 km from the future Nyugati station, the train left the tracks and fell down the railway embankment. Falling from a height of about 10–20 meters, the locomotive dug deep into the ground below, taking six wagons with it. The locomotive's boiler burst.

== Aftermath ==
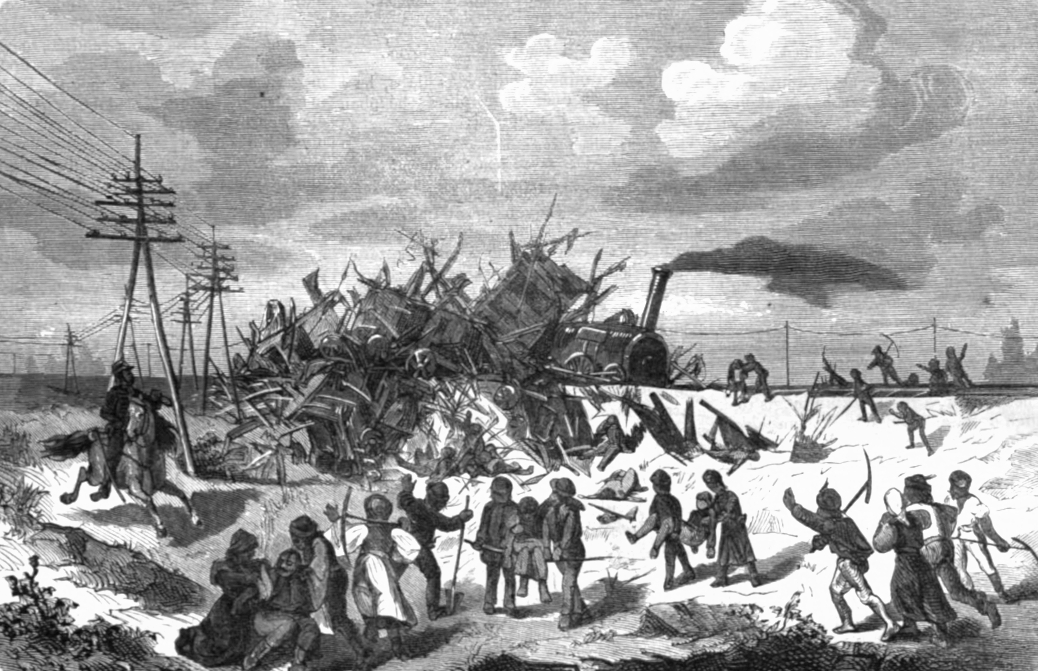
Illustration of the event by Alájos Gerhard (Vasárnapi Ujság, 18 May 1873)

Volunteers reached the scene some time later. The first state official to arrive and investigate was the state judge Dr. Thaiss, and a vicar named Halak gave the last rites. About 40 sheep were also killed in the crash. The final toll of the event was 26 dead and about 50 injured.

During the investigation, a station attendant named Biedermann was arrested at Kőbánya station on suspicion of not informing the driver. After his arrest, he attempted suicide several times but was prevented from doing so. The Kőbánya stationmaster, the chief construction manager of the reconstruction works, and two railway officials were also reportedly arrested.

The scale of the accident attracted the attention of non-Hungarian periodicals across the Austro-Hungarian Empire, including the Czech Národní listy, the Austrian Illustrirtes Wiener Extrablatt and the Slovene Slovenski Narod. The liability of railway companies for damages was regulated by two railway regulation acts of 1874, the year after the accident, dealing with "liability for death or personal injury caused by railways".

== See also ==
- History of Budapest
- Budapest–Szolnok–Debrecen–Nyíregyháza–Záhony railway
