= Budapest–Újszász–Szolnok railway =

Railway line in Hungary

Budapest–Újszász–Szolnok railway line
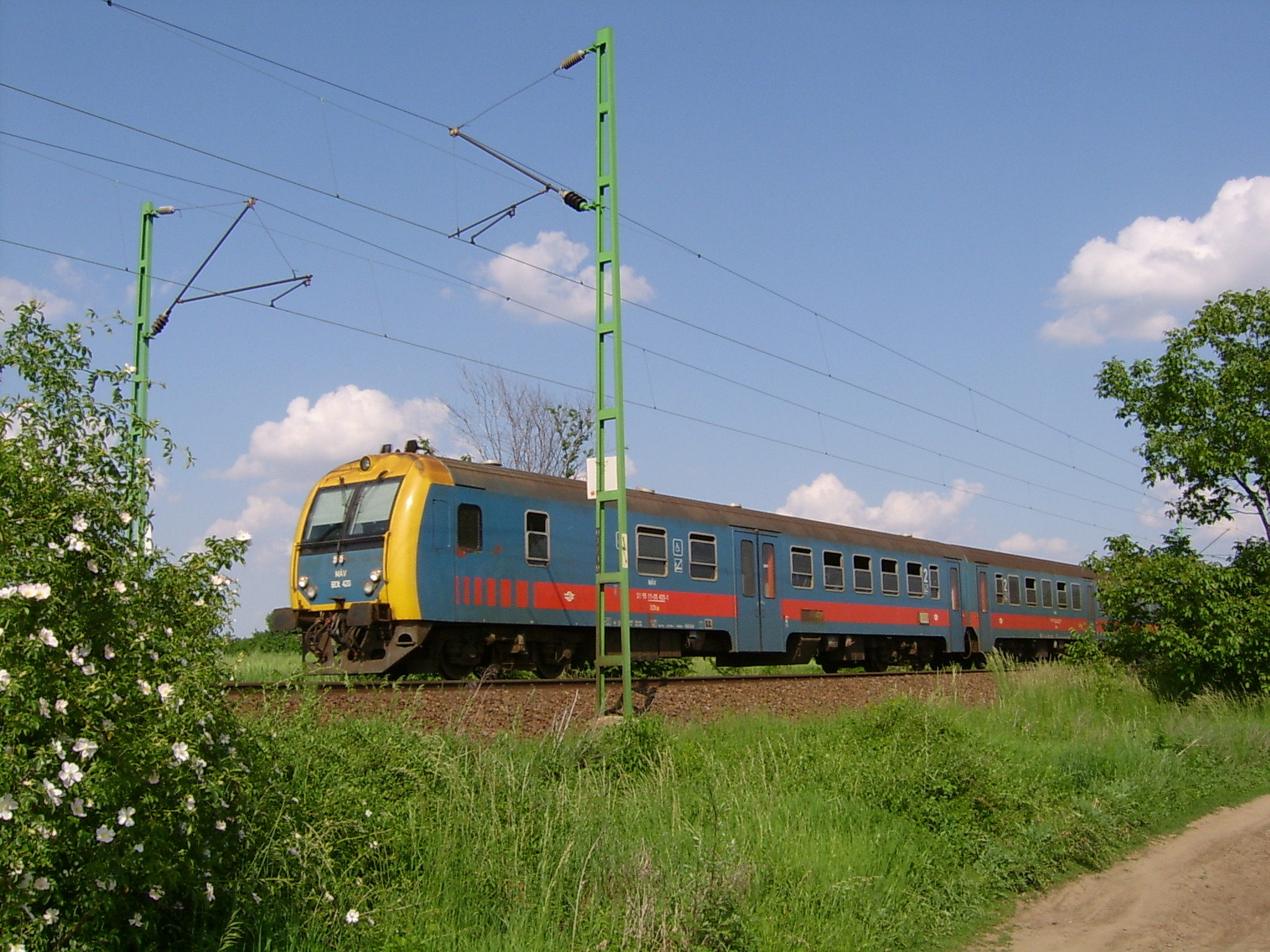
- Regional train between Gyömrő and Maglódi nyaraló

Service
- Route number: 120a

Technical
- Line length: 100 km
- Track gauge: 1435 mm
- Electrification: 25 kV 50 Hz AC AC
- Operating speed: 100 / 120 km/h max.

Budapest–Újszász–Szolnok railway line is the number 120a line of the MÁV. It is a double track, electrified track, which is part of the international rail system. It goes on as Line number 120, which connects Budapest, Békéscsaba, Lökösháza, Arad (in Romania). The line from Budapest to Szolnok is 100 km long.

== Track ==
Starting from Budapest as far as Rákos, it runs on the same track as the 80a line. Here it turns to south-southwest, crosses the plain of Pest and the south part of the hills of Gödöllő. Its route follows the Tápió and Zagyva rivers, crossing at Újszász. Here it meets with lines 82 and 86, and runs on the same track. The track rises between Budapest and Gyömrő, then descends to Tápiószecső. Between Tápiószecső and Szolnok it runs on mainly flat terrain.

From	To	Length [km]	Max speed [km/h]
Keleti railway station	Rákos	8	80
Rákos	Tápiószele	60	100
Tápiószele	Szolnok	32	120

== History ==
It was opened for traffic on 12 March 1882. It was an important line of that period, because the other line connecting the two cities were privately owned by StEG and MÁV needed a track owned by itself which would connect Józsefváros railway station with Szolnok. Later it was expanded up to the Keleti railway station. Line was electrified in 1969. There were huge changes in the early 2000s. New rails came to the track, lines between Rákos and Maglód as well as between Sülysáp and Tápiószecső and between Újszsz and Szolnok were renovated. Some stations were renovated as well. Rebuilding of the line between Tápiószecső and Nagykáta was finished in 2008.

MÁV charged MÁVÉPCEL Kft for the renovation of the line. It was funded from loan issued by the EBRD. As part of the Új Magyrország (New Hungary) improvement plan, there were built P+R and B+R parking places: to the stations of the following villages, towns: Gyömrő, Sülysáp, Tápiószecső, Szentmártonkáta, Nagykáta. There are cameras which safeguard the vehicles.

== Traffic ==
It is one of the busiest suburban rail lines of the country. Its characteristic is that mainly the whole traffic is made of the travelling to and from working. As a result, line is heavily used in rush-hours.

Since 10 December 2006 there is a clock-face scheduling on the line. As a result there is express train in every two hours to Békéscsaba, there is regional train to Szolnok, which does not stop to Sülysáp, except at Rákos and Kőbánya-felső. Since 12 December 2010 there is regional train between Budapest and Sülysáp in working days twice, on public holidays once in an hour. These stop at every stations and stops. In rush hours of working days there is a fast regional train between Budapest and Nagykáta. These run hourly. To the capital, both regional and zoning trains run in every 20 minutes. As of today, there is no service at Abonyi út station at the line.

== Rolling stock ==
There are MÁV V43 and MÁV V63 locomotives on the line. Since 2010 there are some MÁV 1047 and ÖBB 1116, Taurus rails as well. Later ones are operated by Rail Cargo Hungaria. There are EuroNight-, EuroCity-, InterCity-, express-, regional freight trains, LoLa as well. Regional trains are usually made up by 5 coaches and one locomotive. These are usually push-pull trains. Most of them are Bhvs reconstructed in Dunakeszi by Bombardier.

Since the autumn of 2012 there is some FLIRT stock as well, which was produced by Stadler.
