= Abony railway station =

Railway station in Abony, Hungary

Abony
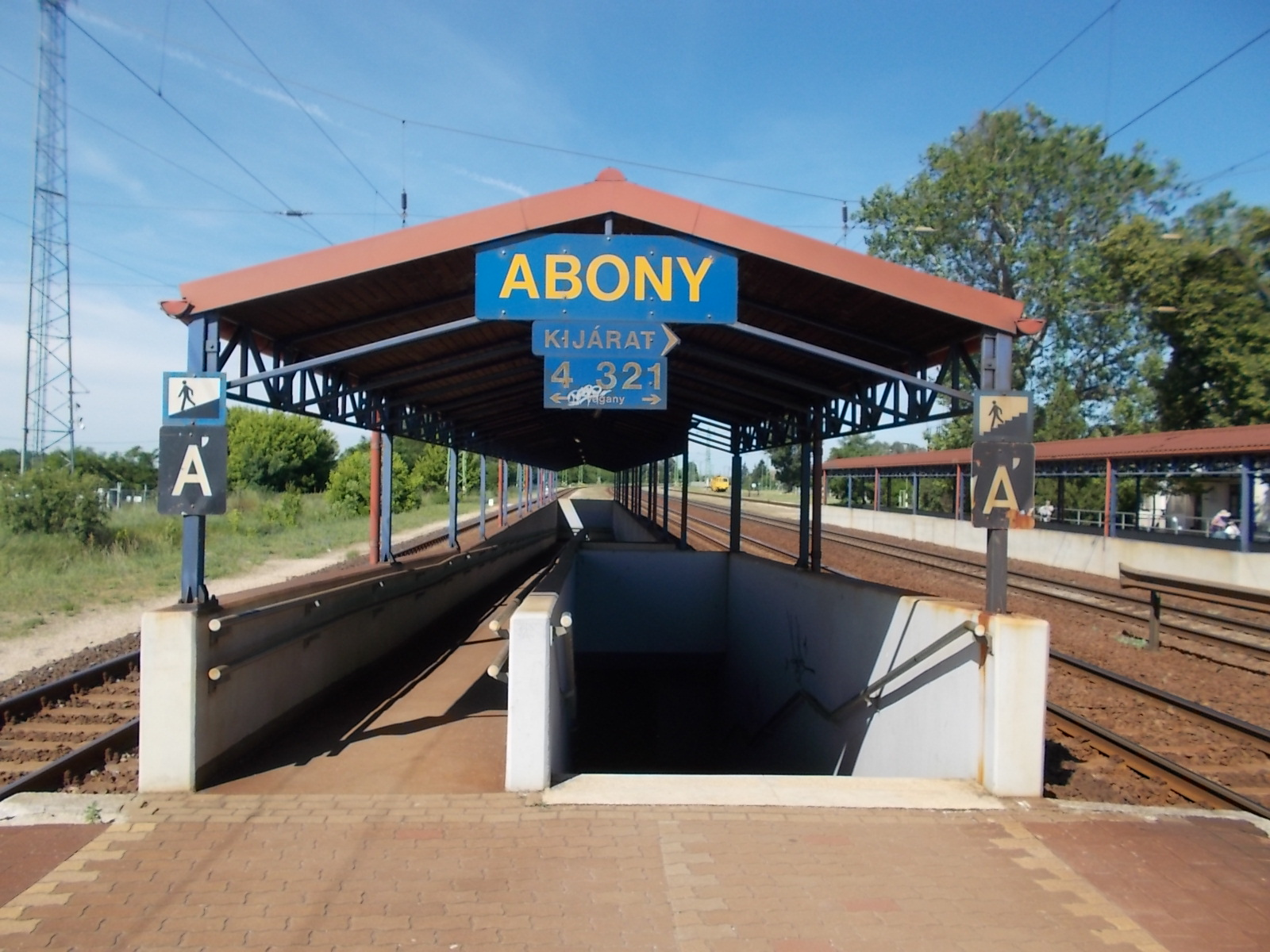
- Platform exit

General information
- Location: Baross Gábor u. 2. 2740 Abony; Hungary
- Coordinates: 47°10′23.44″N 20°0′57.82″E
- System: Magyar Államvasutak
- Owner: Hungarian State Railways
- Line: Line 100(A)
- Platforms: 5
- Connections: Bus (long-distance)

History
- Opened: 1847

Services
Preceding station	MÁV START	Following station
Cegléd towards Fonyód	Expresszvonat	Szolnok towards Záhony
Cegléd towards Zánka-Erzsébettábor	Expresszvonat	Szolnok towards Záhony
Cegléd towards Budapest Nyugati	InterRegio	Szolnok towards Debrecen
Cegléd towards Kecskemét	S225	Szolnok Terminus
Cegléd towards Budapest Nyugati	S50	Szolnok Terminus
Cegléd towards Budapest Nyugati	Z50	Szolnok Terminus
Location
- Location within Hungary

Abony railway station (Hungarian: Abony vasútállomás) is a railway station of the Hungarian State Railways (MÁV) in Abony, Hungary. The station is located on the Budapest–Cegléd–Szolnok railway (Line 100A).

== Transport ==
- Bus (long-distance): 535

== Services ==
As of the July 2023 timetable change, the following services stop at Abony:

- Expresszvonat: two round-trips per day between Fonyód and Záhony and between Zánka-Erzsébettábor and Záhony.
- InterRegio: hourly service between Cegléd and Debrecen.
- Személyvonat ( / /: frequent service between Cegléd and Szolnok, hourly service to Kecskemét, and rush-hour service to Budapest Nyugati.

== Distance from other railway stations ==
- Budapest -Nyugati: 89 km
- Kőbánya-Kispest: 78 km
- Albertirsa: 34 km
- Cegléd: 16 km
- Szolnok: 11 km
- Püspökladány: 107 km
- Debrecen: 132 km
- Nyíregyháza: 181 km

== See also ==
- History of rail transport in Hungary
- Rail transport in Hungary
