= Tápiószecső =

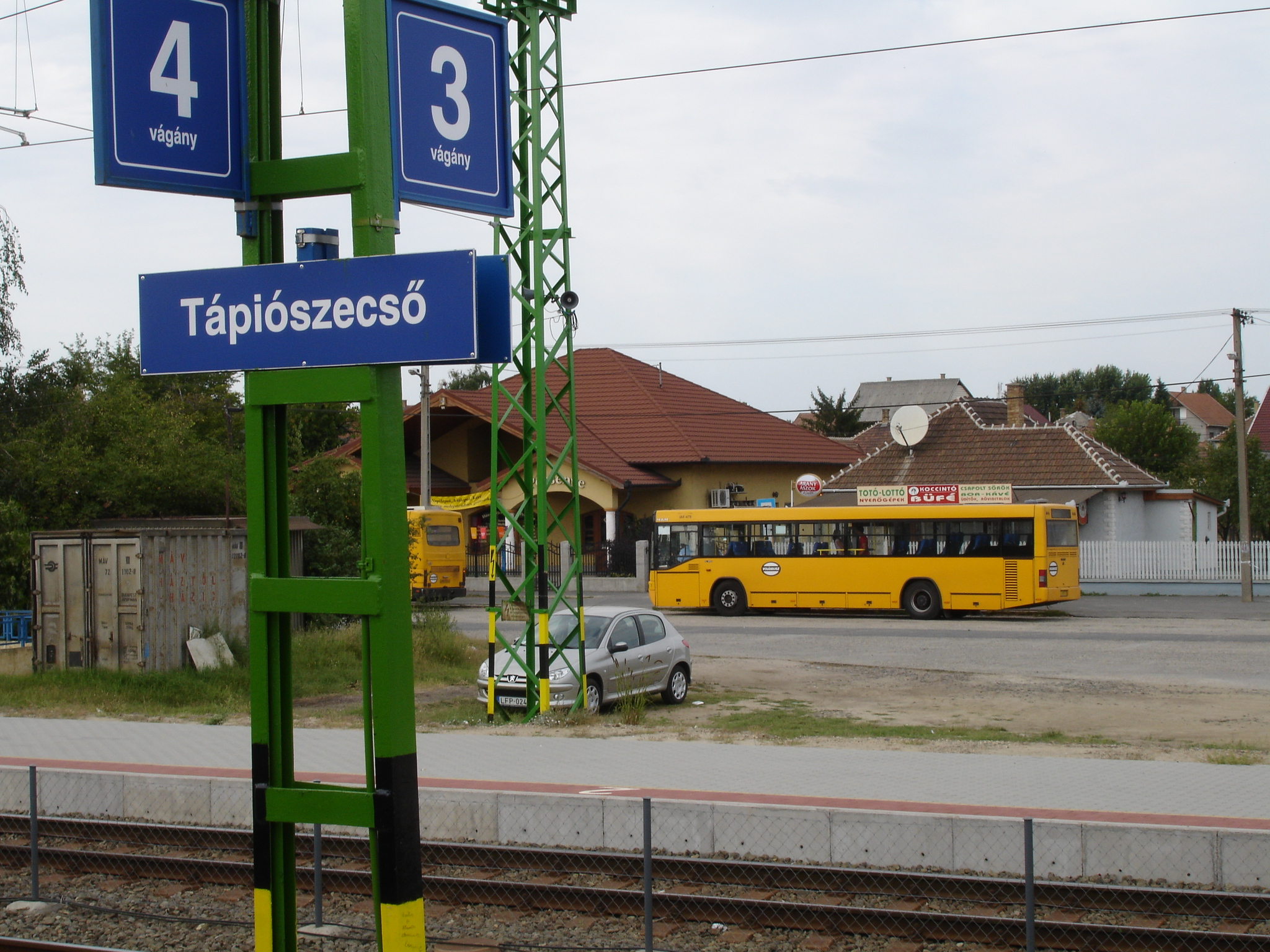

- Coat of arms

- Location of Tápiószecső in Hungary
- Coordinates: 47°27′3.60″N 19°35′43.62″E
- Country: Hungary
- Region: Central Hungary
- County: Pest
- Subregion: Nagykátai
- Rank: Town

Government
  - Mayor: Gál Csaba

Area
  - Total: 38.38 km^{2} (14.82 sq mi)

Population
  - Total: 6,162
  - Density: 160.6/km^{2} (415.8/sq mi)
- Time zone: UTC+1 (CET)
  - Summer (DST): UTC+2 (CEST)
- Postal code: 2251
- Area code: +36 29
- KSH code: 4306
- Website: www.tapioszecso.hu

Tápiószecső is a village in Pest county, Hungary. It is a very old settlement which has been inhabited since prehistoric times. Evidence of human activities has been found and exhibited in the Hungarian National Museum. In the Middle Ages the town was also known as 'Key-Town' which referred to the key of the city walls. According to tradition, the guardian of the key was called 'Szecső'. It is commonly believed that the name of the town origins from this guardian. 'Tápió' refers to the small stream near the village.

The village lies next to Gödöllő hill. Small hills can be found near Tápiószecső with fertile soil (these hills were also referred to as 'Feketék', which means 'Black soil'), which made it possible to establish excellent vineyards. These vineyards were famous for being fruitful, making them a hallmark of the village.

As for sightseeing, Hevessy Castle is a place to visit in Magdolna-telep (the western part of the village), which was owned by the noble Hevessy family for several centuries.

The current mayor of the town is Gál Csaba, who was elected in 2019.
