= History of Budapest =

Budapest, including the Banks of the Danube, the Buda Castle Quarter and Andrássy Avenue
UNESCO World Heritage Site
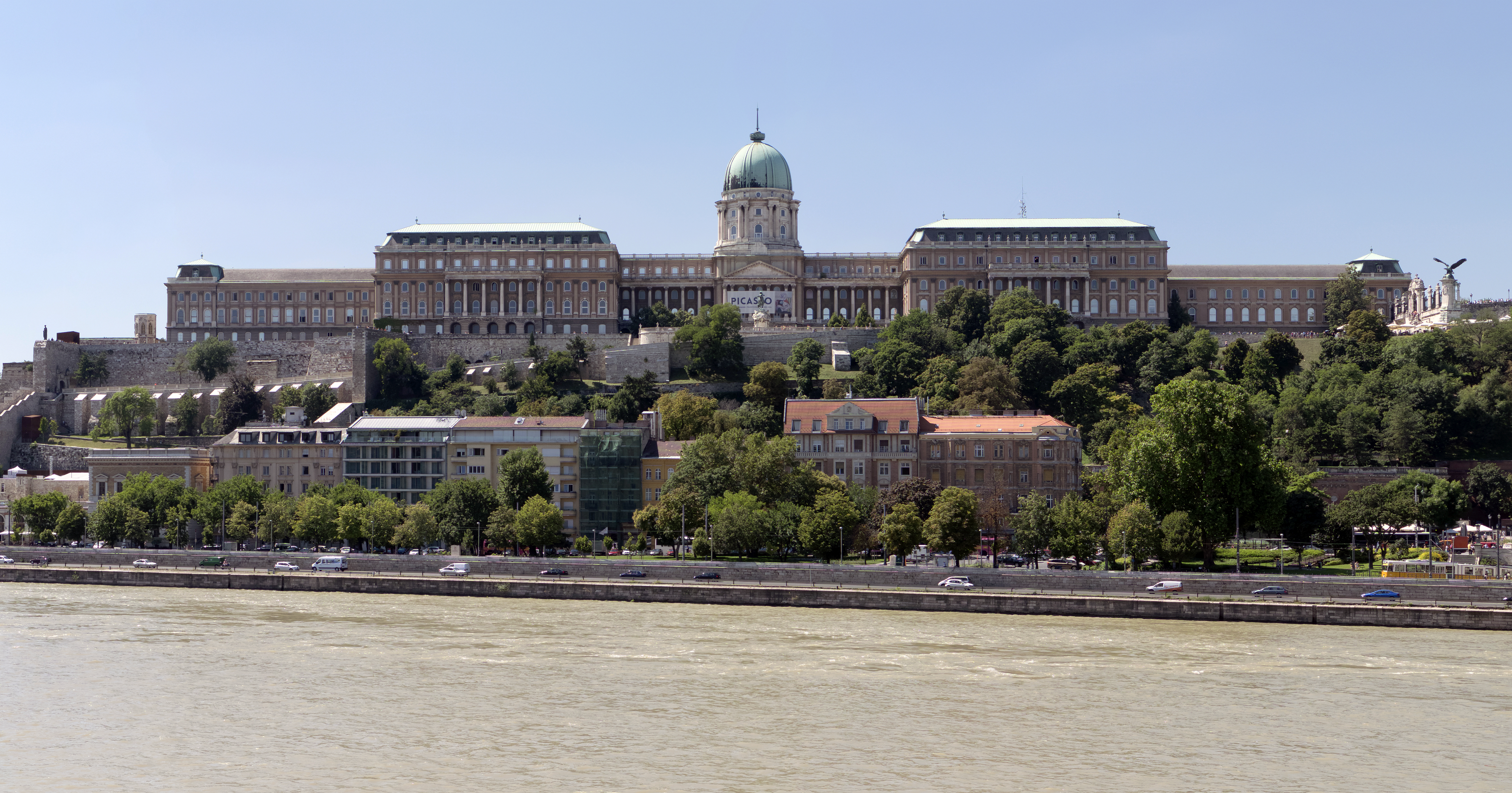
- Buda Castle from the Danube River

- Location within Hungary
- Location: Budapest, Central Hungary, Hungary
- Criteria: Cultural: (ii)(iv)
- Reference: 400bis
- Inscription: 1987 (11th Session)
- Extensions: 2002
- Area: 473.3 ha (1,170 acres)
- Buffer zone: 493.8 ha (1,220 acres)
- Coordinates: 47°28′56.712″N 19°4′14.412″E

The city of Budapest was officially created on 17 November 1873 from a merger of the three neighboring cities of Pest, Buda and Óbuda. Smaller towns on the outskirts of the original city were amalgamated into Greater Budapest in 1950. The origins of Budapest can be traced to Celts who occupied the plains of Hungary in the 4th century BC. The area was later conquered by the Roman Empire, which established the fortress and town of Aquincum on the site of today's Budapest around AD 100. The Romans were expelled in the 5th century by the Huns, who were challenged by various tribes during the next several centuries. The Hungarian conquest of the Carpathian Basin started at the end of the 9th century, and the Kingdom of Hungary was established at the end of the 11th century.

From around 1300 to the incorporation of 1873, Buda was the capital of the Kingdom of Hungary for five periods of less than a century each.

== Prehistory and Roman era ==
The first town, built by Celts in the first century BC, occupied about 30 hectares along the slopes of Gellért Hill. Archaeological finds suggest that it may have been a densely populated settlement with a separate district of craftsmen (potteries and bronze foundries). It may have been a trading centre as well, as coins coming from different regions would indicate. The town was occupied by the Romans at the beginning of the Christian era. Its inhabitants moved to the Danube plains to a city retaining the Celtic name (Aquincum) in the first century AD. In AD 106, the city became the capital of the Roman province of Pannonia Inferior. The headquarters of the governor and significant military force were stationed here, and its population numbered about 20,000. It was frequently involved in wars on the border of the Roman Empire (formed by the Danube River).

Meanwhile, settlement in the area east of the Danube, which was not part of the Roman Empire, remained Germanic and Sarmatian in character.

== Middle Ages ==
The Romans pulled out of the Hungarian plains in the 5th century AD to be succeeded by the Huns after fierce warfare. Upon the fragmentation of the Huns that resulted from the death of Attila the Hun, Germanic tribes (such as the Lombards) and the Avars occupied the area during the second Age of Migrations. The Avar Khaganate dominated Pannonia between the 6th and 9th centuries.

From 829, Pannonia became part of Bulgaria following the collapse of the Avar Khaganate and a defeat of the forces of the Holy Roman Empire under Louis the Pious at the hands of a Bulgarian army under Omurtag. The Bulgarians built two frontier fortresses, Buda and Pest, on opposing sides of the Danube River. While other tribes spread across the entire Carpathian basin, the clan of Árpád settled down on Csepel Island, a large island in the Danube, and formed a shelter for the settlers who started agricultural works in what is the south part of Budapest today. It was under the Árpád dynasty that Hungary became a Christian state, ruled first from Esztergom and later from Székesfehérvár.

After the Bulgarian–Hungarian Wars, Buda and Pest started to develop economically in the 12th century, largely due to the French, Walloon and German settlers who migrated there and worked and traded under royal protection along the banks of the Danube. Both towns were devastated during the Mongol invasion of Europe in 1241–42 and subsequently rebuilt by colonists from Germany, who renamed Buda "Ofen" ("furnace"), after its numerous lime kilns. The name for Pest, which has a Slavic origin, also means "furnace".

== Renaissance ==
During the 14th century, the Angevin kings of Hungary (who were of French origin) established Buda as the royal seat of centralized power. They built a succession of palaces on the Várhegy (Castle Hill) and reached their zenith of power and prestige during the Renaissance under "Good King" Matthias Corvinus (Hunyadi Mátyás), who reigned from 1458 to 1490. Along with his Italian-born wife, Queen Beatrice of Naples, he presided over a golden age of prosperity and arts patronage.

Hungary's catastrophic defeat in the Battle of Mohács in 1526 against the Turks led by Suleiman the Magnificent paved the way for the Ottoman occupation of Hungary. Suleiman's Siege of Buda (1541) was part of the Little War in Hungary between the Habsburgs and the Ottoman Empire. Three years after the Battle of Vienna in 1683, a pan-European multinational army besieged Buda Castle in the Battle of Buda (1686) for six weeks, finally recapturing it on the 12th attempt with heavy losses on both sides.

== 18th century ==
During the 18th century, under the rule of Charles VI, Maria Theresia and her son Joseph II, Budapest was an insignificant provincial town. Vienna controlled the foreign affairs, defense, tariffs, and other functions of the government of the kingdom of Hungary. A mostly formal Diet, customarily called together every three years in Pozsony (Bratislava), ruled what was called "Royal Hungary".

== 19th century ==
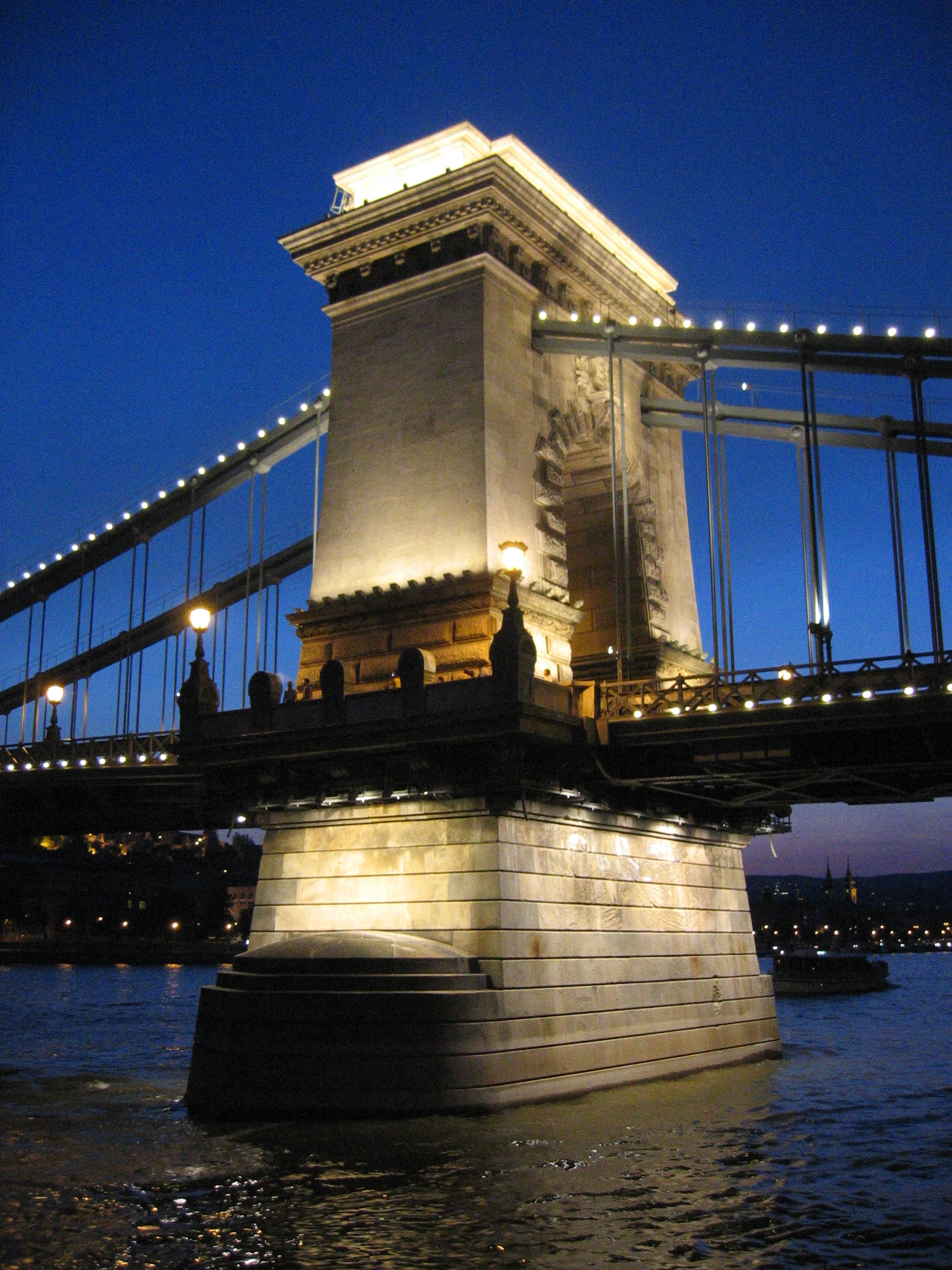
Széchenyi Chain Bridge

In the first decades of the following century, Pest became the center of the Reform movement led by Count Széchenyi, whose vision of progress was embodied in the construction of the Lánchíd (Chain Bridge). This became the first permanent bridge between Buda and Pest, which had until then, relied strictly on pontoon bridges or barges and ferries.

The Hungarian Revolution of 1848 was part of the Revolutions of 1848 in the Habsburg areas. With the leadership of Lajos Kossuth (1802–94) and the "people's rights-liberals" dominated parliament, Sándor Petőfi (1823–49), also a renowned poet, and his fellow revolutionaries began to plot the downfall of the Habsburgs in Budapest at the Café Pilvax (which exists to this day in central Pest). From here, they planned and mobilized crowds on the streets of Pest, leading to the steps of the National Museum where Petőfi recited his moving "National Poem" which roused up the crowds and gave a push start of emotions to the people, creating passion for the revolution, similar to the French revolution before. After the civil war of fighting for independence ended in defeat for the Hungarians, Habsburg repression was epitomized by the newly built Citadella on top of Gellért Hill, built to frighten the citizens with its cannons and large garrison of soldiers overlooking the entire city.

The Austro-Hungarian Compromise of 1867 made allowance for the dual monarchy of Austria-Hungary, known in German as k.u.k. (based on German for "Emperor and King"). The twin cities underwent rapid growth and expansion, and finally formally merged. In 1870, under Prime Minister Gyula Andrássy, the Metropolitan Board of Public Works (modeled on the London Metropolitan Board of Works) was created to develop more stringent standards for construction and a long-term plan for the city. While competing with Vienna, the country's resources were concentrated in Budapest (e.g. through tax breaks) Its favourable transport-geographical position was reinforced by the radially built road and rail network. Conscious urban development began with the establishment of the Metropolitan Council of Public Works. The Council was composed of aristocrats - Gyula Andrássy and Baron Frigyes Podmaniczky - who planned and proportioned the inner area of Budapest, creating large ring roads and boulevards. The rapid pace of construction resulted in a unified eclectic style for the city centre. Districts with different functions were separated: business, residential and industrial districts were created. Pest was extensively rebuilt based on the model of Paris, with the main artery: Nagykörút (Great Boulevard) and Andrássy Avenue which lead to Heroes' Square and a great park with fountains and lakes. Budapest's millennial anniversary celebrations of the settlement of the Magyars in the region in 1896 brought a fresh rush of construction and development, including the opening of the first line of the Budapest Metro under Andrassy Avenue. The Heroes' Square and Vajdahunyad Castle, located at end of Andrássy Avenue are just two perfect examples of the monumental scale and style that influenced the period. New suburbs were created to make room and house the rapidly growing and financially expanding population, which by now was predominantly Magyar, although there developed a sizable German as well as a Jewish community due to immigration to the city. In texts from around that period, Budapest was commonly rendered as "Buda-Pesth" (or "Budapesth") in English.

By the end of the 19th century, Budapest had become one of the cultural centers of Europe. It also became one of the most important centres of the Aromanian diaspora during the 19th century along with Vienna, with the Aromanian population of both cities being one of the first ones to develop a strictly Aromanian identity.

== 20th century ==
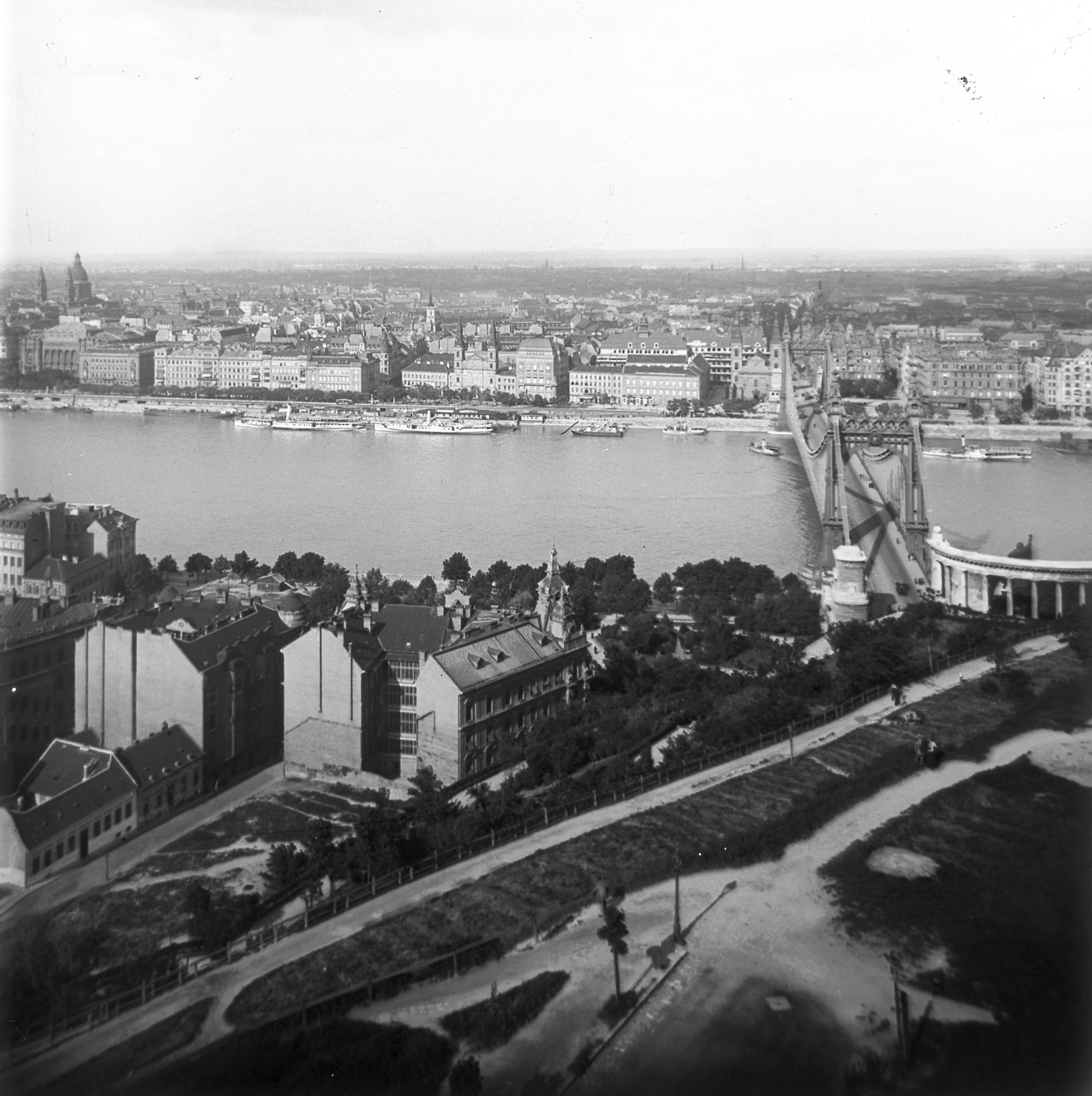
View of the city in 1915

At the beginning of the 20th century the cultural diversity, prosperity and well-being of Budapest rivaled that of Vienna and its café society that of Paris, a belle époque stopped by World War I. In the aftermath of World War I which had led to the collapse of the Austro-Hungarian Empire, half of the Hungarian population was cut away from Hungary by the Treaty of Trianon and made part of surrounding nations. In 1918–19, Budapest was shaken by two revolutions: the Aster Revolution brought about the Hungarian Democratic Republic, which was followed by the Hungarian Soviet Republic, a short-lived Communist regime led by Béla Kun, followed by two years of White Terror. The Hungarian–Romanian War of 1919 ended with the Romanian occupation of parts of Hungary proper, including Budapest in August 1919, and the establishment of the Kingdom of Hungary, led by Miklós Horthy, the self-appointed regent for the exiled King Karl IV (see the conflict of Charles IV with Miklós Horthy). His domain and regency was characterized by gala balls as well as hunger marches by the poor, and of nationalism and antisemitism from joining the Nazis, who promised the reward of re-joining of the Hungarian nation as a whole in the post-Trianon era. Yet Horthy was considered a moderate compared to the fascist Arrow Cross Party, whose power grew as World War II raged across Europe.

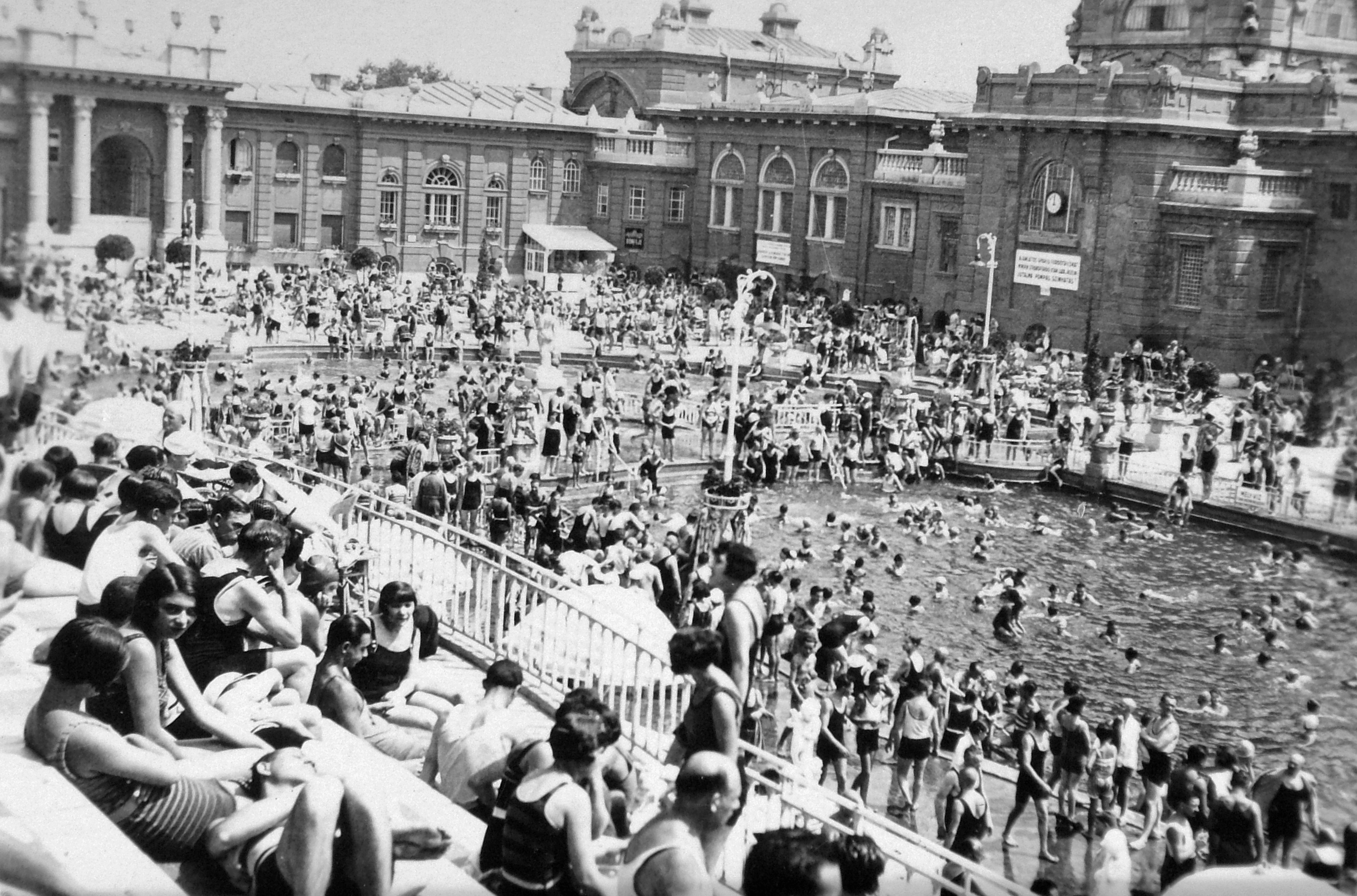
Bathers at Széchenyi thermal bath, 1930

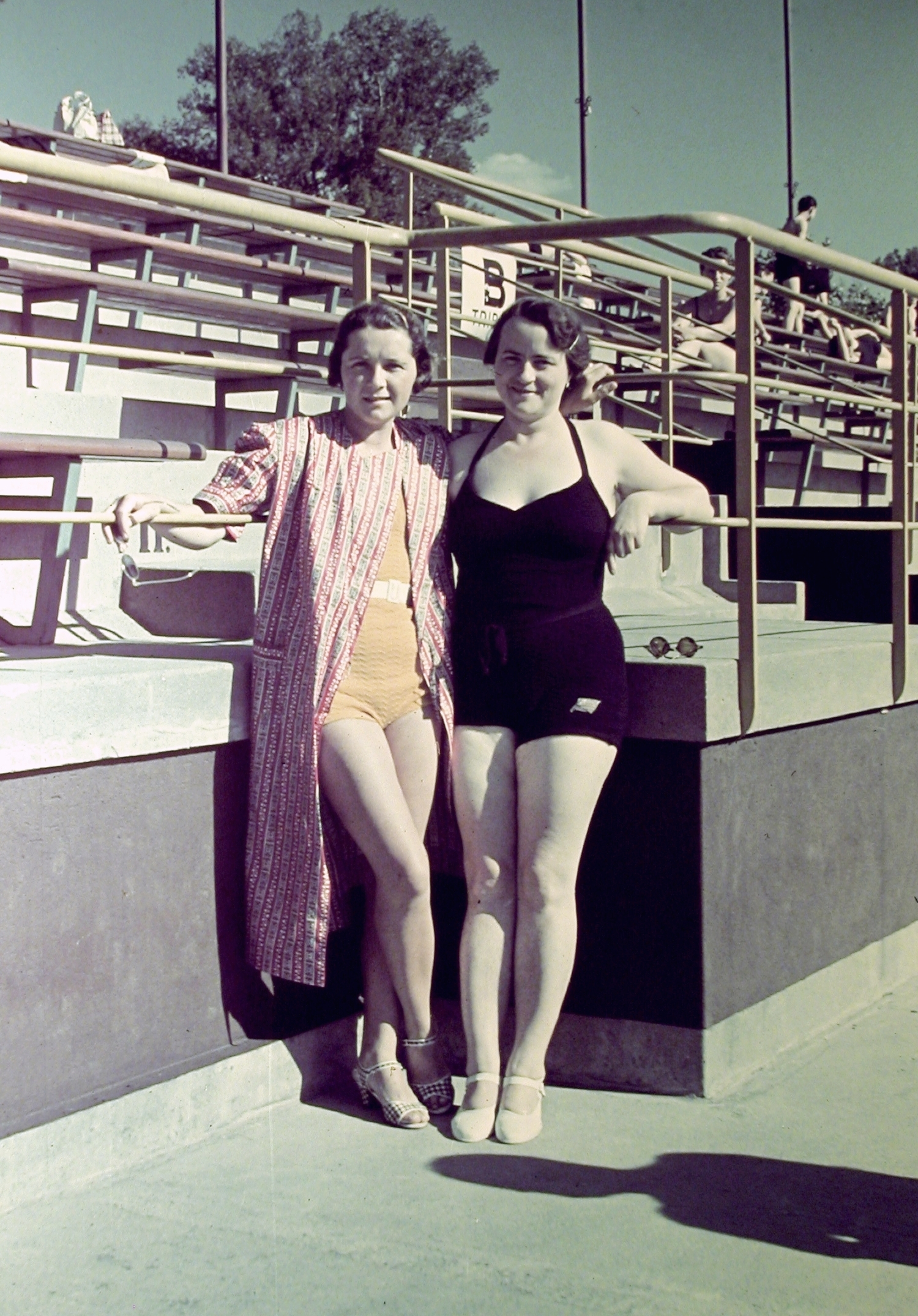
Bathers in Budapest, 1938

Anticipating and knowing about Horthy's communication with the Allies and possible defection from the Axis alliance in 1944, the Nazis staged “Operation Panzerfaust”, a coup against Horthy, and installed an Arrow Cross government under Ferenc Szálasi to make allowance for the unobstructed massacre of the Jews of Budapest.

Before World War II, approximately 200,000 Jews lived in Budapest, making it the center of Hungarian Jewish cultural life. In the late 1930s and early 1940s, Budapest was a safe haven for Jewish refugees. Before the war some 5,000 refugees, primarily from Germany and Austria, arrived in Budapest. With the beginning of deportations of Jews from Slovakia in March 1942, as many as 8,000 Slovak Jewish refugees also settled in Budapest. Hungary was allied with Nazi Germany. Despite discriminatory legislation against the Jews and widespread antisemitism, the Jewish community of Budapest was relatively secure until the German occupation of Hungary in March 1944 (Operation Margarethe). With the occupation, the Germans ordered the establishment of a Jewish council in Budapest and severely restricted Jewish life. Apartments occupied by Jews were confiscated. Hundreds of Jews were rounded up and interned in the Kistarcsa transit camp (originally established by Hungarian authorities), 15 miles (24 km) northeast of Budapest. Between April and July 1944, the Germans and Hungarians deported Jews from the Hungarian provinces. By the end of July, the Jews in Budapest were virtually the only Jews remaining in Hungary. They were not immediately ghettoized. Instead, in June 1944, Hungarian authorities ordered the Jews into over 2,000 designated buildings scattered throughout the city. The buildings were marked with Stars of David. About 25,000 Jews from the suburbs of Budapest were rounded up and transported to the Auschwitz-Birkenau extermination camp. Hungarian authorities suspended the deportations in July 1944, sparing the remaining Jews of Budapest, at least temporarily. Many Jews searched for places of hiding or for protection. They were aided by foreign diplomats like Nuncio Angelo Rotta, Raoul Wallenberg, Giorgio Perlasca, Carl Lutz, Friedrich Born, Harald Feller, Angel Sanz Briz and George Mandel-Mantello who organized false papers and safe houses for them. These actions saved tens of thousands of Jews.

In October 1944, Germany orchestrated a coup and installed a new Hungarian government dominated by the fascist Arrow Cross Party under Ferenc Szálasi. The remaining Jews of Budapest were again in grave danger. The Arrow Cross instituted a reign of terror in Budapest and hundreds of Jews were shot. Jews were also drafted for brutal forced labor. On November 8, 1944, the Arrow Cross militia concentrated more than 70,000 Jews—men, women, and children—in the Ujlaki brickyards in Obuda, and from there forced them to march on foot to camps in Austria. Thousands were shot and thousands more died as a result of starvation or exposure to the bitter cold. The prisoners who survived the death march reached Austria in late December 1944. There, the Germans took them to various concentration camps, especially Dachau in southern Germany and Mauthausen in northern Austria, and to Vienna, where they were employed in the construction of fortifications around the city. In November 1944, the Arrow Cross ordered the remaining Jews in Budapest into a closed ghetto. Jews who did not have protective papers issued by a neutral power were to move to the ghetto by early December. Between December 1944 and the end of January 1945, the Arrow Cross took Jews from the ghetto in nightly razzias, as well as deserters from the Hungarian army or political enemies, shot them along the banks of the Danube and threw their bodies into the river. Soviet forces captured Budapest on February 13, 1945. More than 100,000 Jews remained in the city at time of capture.

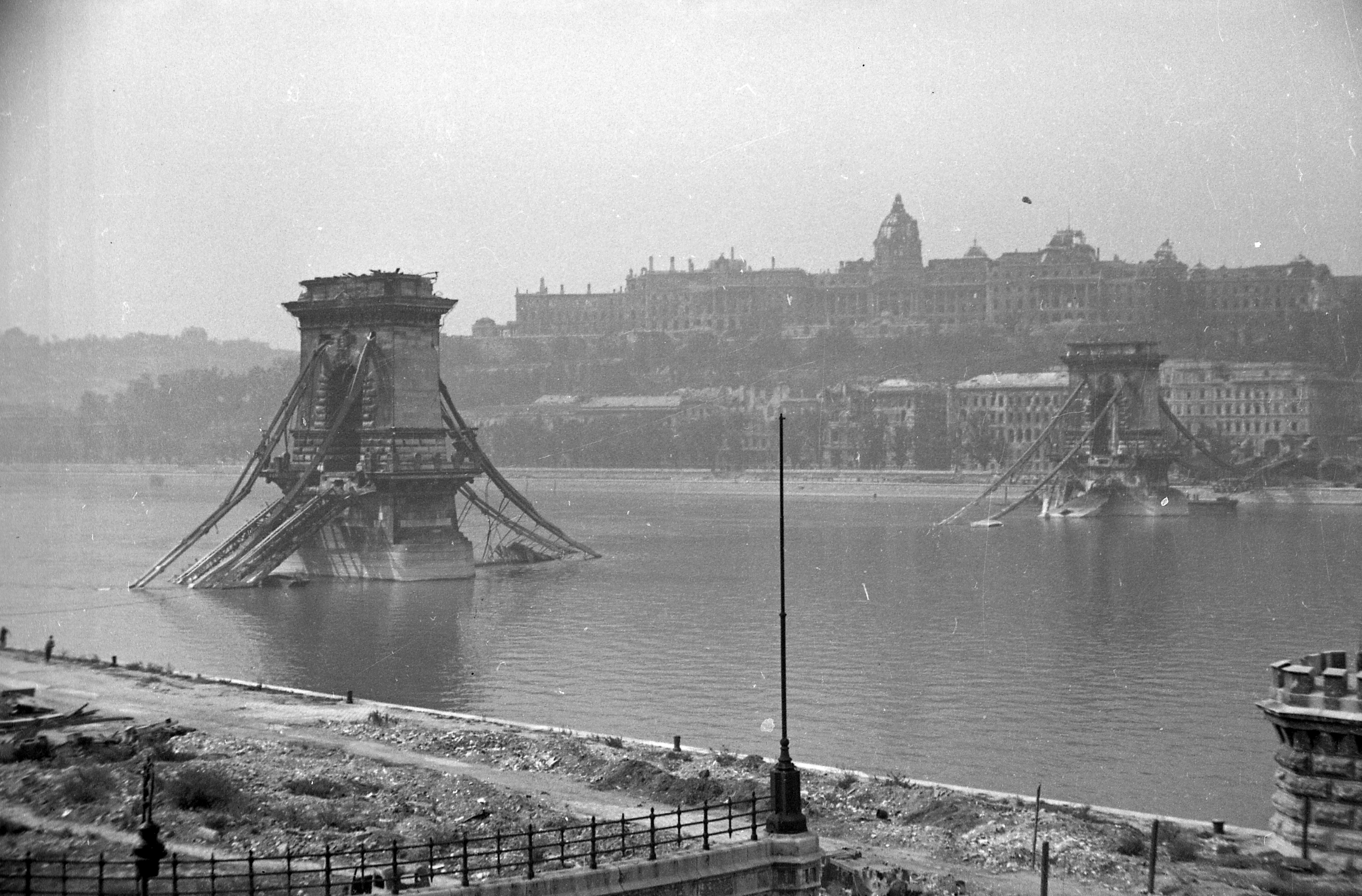
The city suffered extensive damage at the end of the second World War.

Upon retreating, the Germans also blew up all the Danube bridges as a way of hampering the progress of the Communist Red Army of the Soviets. A two-month-long siege of Budapest reduced the entire city, but mostly the Castle District to rubble, as it was assigned to the mostly Hungarian army with German leadership to defend and to "hold back". Most roofs in Budapest were blown in by Soviet bombs, walls blown in by Soviet tanks. The occupants sought shelter in cellars and ate dead horsemeat found in the streets just to survive.

After 1945 free elections were held, in which many parties (among them the Smallholders, the Social Democrats, and the Communists) were voted into Parliament. Due to Soviet pressure the government coalition, led by the Social Democrats, accepted the small Communist Party into the coalition. By the next election, most of the former government MPs were entered into the Communist Party. In the election of 1949, the party, with Soviet backup resources, used the flaw in the so-called 'blue-ticket' election system, from which this election got its name, to have its voters transported in trucks to all voting offices, where with reproduced and collected blue tickets they could vote away from their home address district.

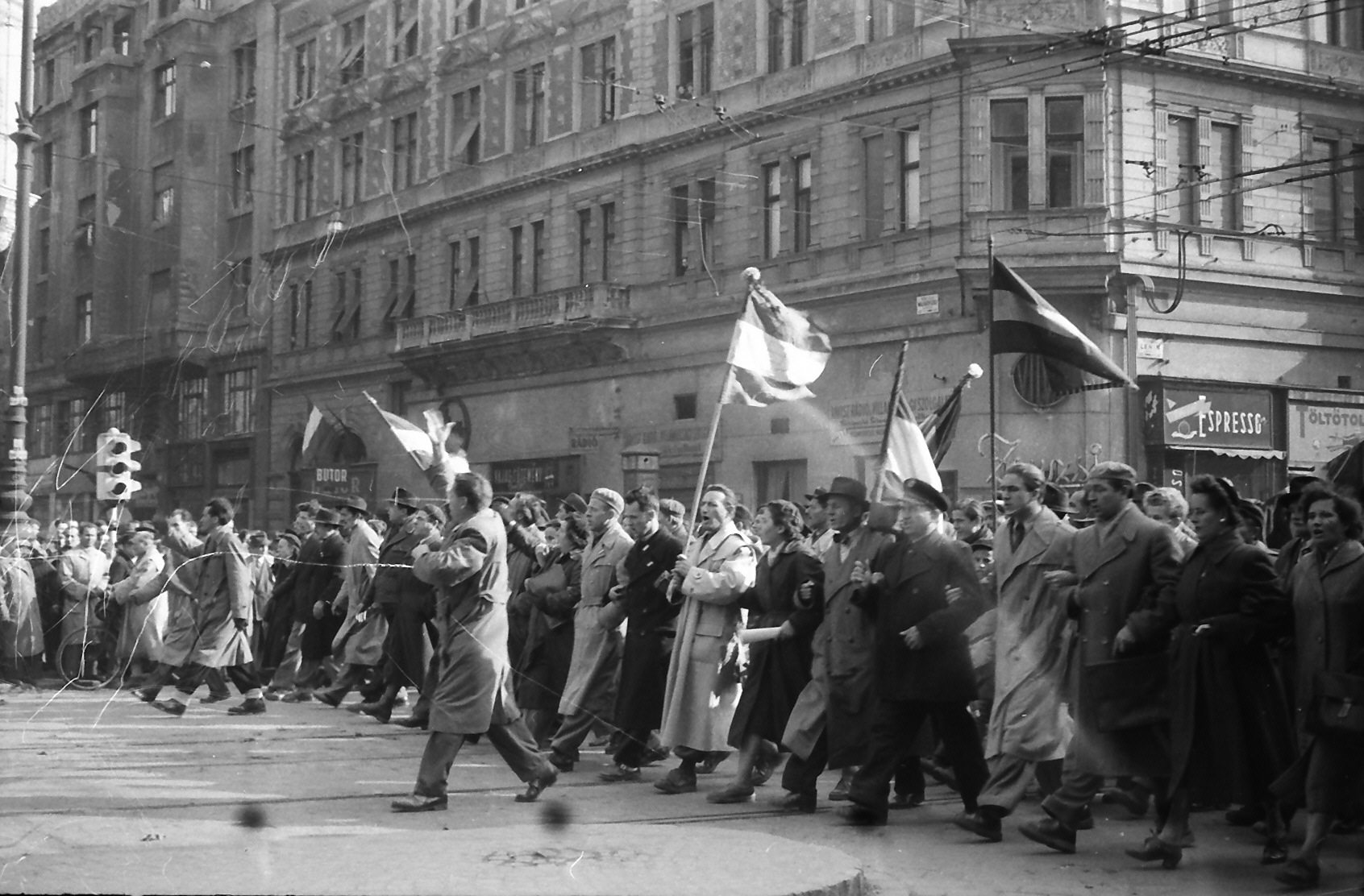
Hungarians march through the streets of Budapest during the 1956 Hungarian Revolution

The Communists gained power while the Soviet Army propped up the Hungarian state. Under their auspices, the former Arrow Cross torture chambers in the prisons filled up with their opponents. Arrests, beatings or summary executions were used as a standard tool by the Secret Police, who employed an extensive net of informants. Random arrests without charge were commonly initiated by regime informants, some of these abductees were never heard from again. By this time the administration was composed predominantly of hardline communists or careerists, who made up the Soviet-accepted controllers of wealth and power. Materials were routinely confiscated from the Hungarian populace and taken to the USSR for "War Repairs". These administrators' actions were rewarded with position and favour. In Budapest this administrative approach was paired with aggressive industrialisation, militarisation, collectivisation and politicisation of the economy. Factories, chimneys, bridges, and railways were rapidly constructed. Workers during rest time were often subjected to Soviet propaganda and had to practice self-criticism in public meetings, negatively appraising their own performance. Rákosi's government was one of the most dictatorial and most exploitative of the Warsaw Pact countries.

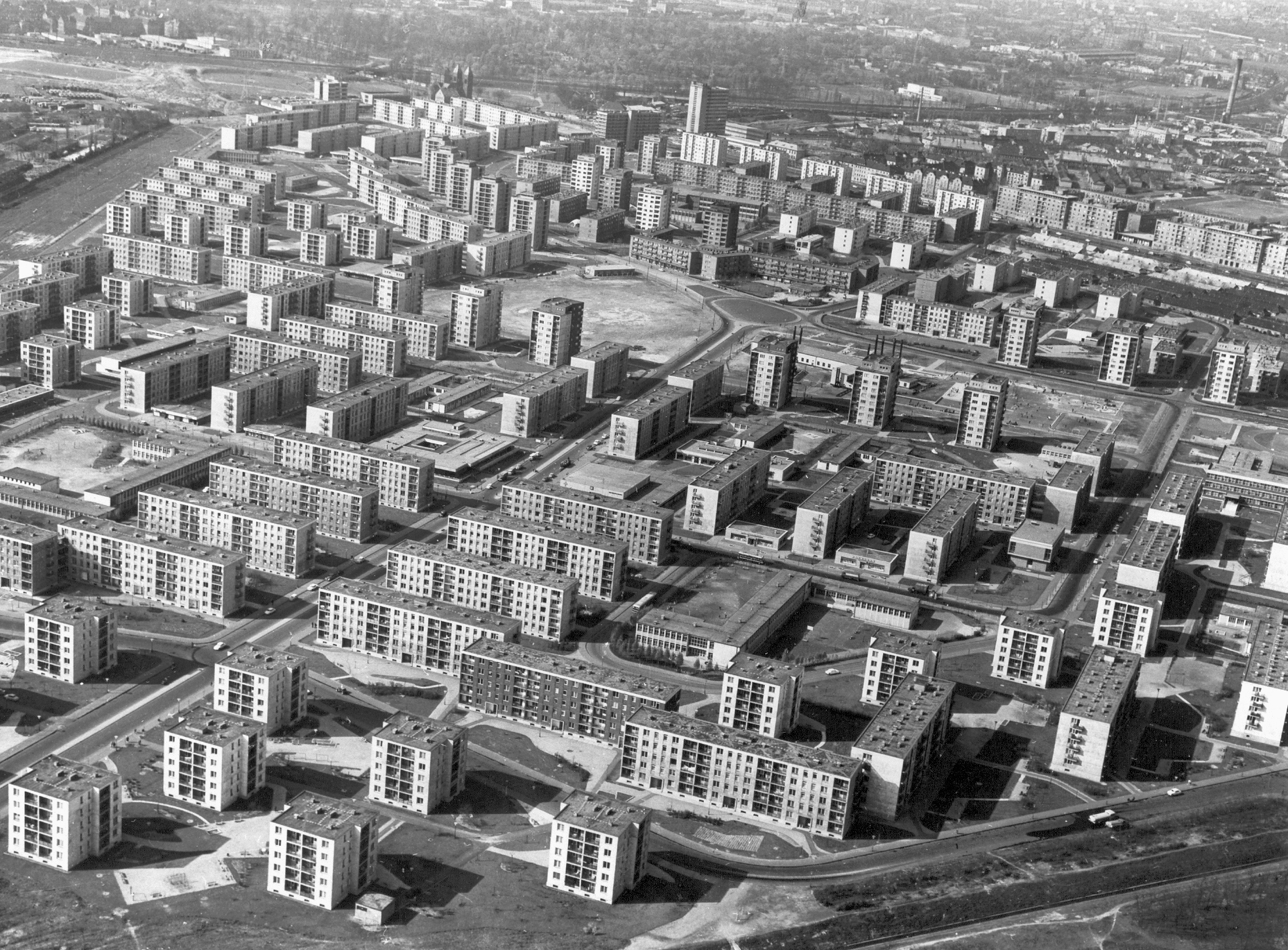
Newly built apartments in 1970

The political situation was centred on advancing the interest of those informal factions, which had their primary focus on well-being. In this situation, Imre Nagy was elected as next prime minister. He had gained widespread popularity by distributing land to farmers, and the support of the elite by practicing self-criticism and completing party programs, even when it conflicted with his proposals. He moved to create a multiparty system, winning the support of the MP majority. He declared Hungarian sovereignty and self-governance, its departure from the Warsaw Pact and its willingness to co-operate with all countries. During this time, the CIA-sponsored Radio Free Europe broadcast effective methods of urban combat, including constructing barricades and producing explosives. In Budapest, peaceful protests demanding Soviet withdrawal, free press, freedom of expression and free elections, were organized by university students, professors and intellectuals. The Soviet Minister for War Issues ordered the brigades to move into the city. In response to this action, the protesters set up defenses. When the tanks and elite forces opened fire on the mass protest situated in front of the Parliament buildings, they caused a national uprising overnight. There were examples of long-stationed Soviet soldiers refusing to accept the authority of their officers and defecting to the revolutionary forces.

The Soviets were eventually defeated and all surviving units were ordered to return to army bases in the countryside. Imre Nagy declared Hungary neutral, stated he was working to cooperate with all willing countries, and declared free elections, parties were founded or reopened in the city. The USA declared that the neutrality of the small country did not affect the World Powers. The Soviet Union, which feared NATO deployment, took this as a permission to invade Hungary. In reality the USA wanted to ensure Hungary was not invaded by retaining its neutral position. Soviet units were ordered to invade, along with the militaries of the surrounding nationalities of the Warsaw Pact, with which Hungary already had a strained history. On November 4, the Warsaw Pact forces launched their attack. Imre Nagy fled to the Yugoslavian Embassy, and refused to take responsibility for ordering resistance. He was promised free passage to the border by the next leader, but was arrested by Soviet troops and later put on trial in secret.

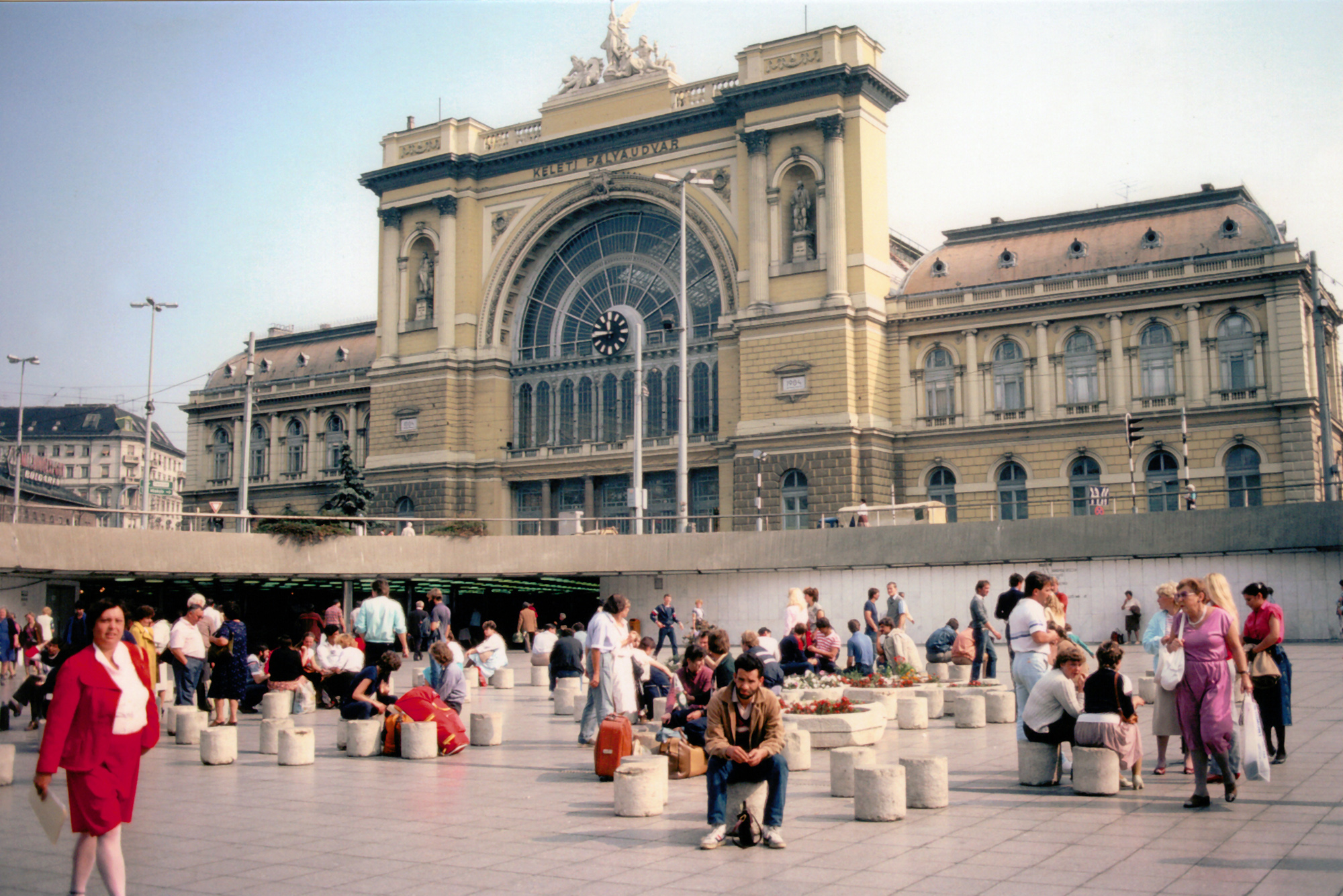
People in front of Keleti railway station, 1985

The Hungarian Revolution of 1956 was suppressed, the Soviets, rather than appointing a Hungarian hardliner or a Soviet general, gave a chance to János Kádár, a former kidnapped minister of the revolution. He defeated the remaining rebel forces, then embarked on cautious reforms to create a "Goulash Communism" that differentiated Hungary from its Warsaw Pact neighbors. Due to the co-operative efforts of Kádár and huge loans taken from the West to offset the failing economy, Hungary became the favorite Communist state of the West by the late 1970s. A decade later, the city was the center of opposition activity, rallies, printing and selling of unauthorized material and secret-service surveillance. In addition the talks between opposition and government representatives (dubbed the "Round Table Consultations") were held there. Finally, the majority of the multi-sided regime decided to step over Gorbachev's line and open the borders (the first official break of the Iron Curtain), declared Hungary a Republic on October 23, 1989 then issued free elections. While communism was toppled in Berlin and Prague, the Hungarian Socialist Workers' Party was simply voted out of power in Hungary, initiating a peaceful transition from one political system to another. Hungarians simply refer to all that has happened since then as "after the System-change".

== After 1989 ==
The revolutions of 1989 brought with them the end of Soviet occupation of Hungary, which meant the end of Communism in Hungary. Budapest succeeded in taking advantage of new economic possibilities and pursuing development more efficiently than the other parts of the country. Upon the shutdown of Socialist industrial plants, plenty of new workplaces were generated, especially on the fields of service and trade industries. In the Budapest area, unemployment is the lowest, and average income per capita is the highest.

The local government law legislated after the transition provided new rights or licenses for the districts of Budapest, like the right to own and finance the community public services should they want and decide the density and micro-layout of area types that are defined by the Metropolitan Government. Local minority governments had also sprang forth, active mainly on cultural fields.

Opposition candidate Gergely Karácsony won the 2019 Budapest mayoral election, meaning the first electoral blow for Hungary's nationalist prime minister Viktor Orbán since coming to power in 2010.

== Images ==
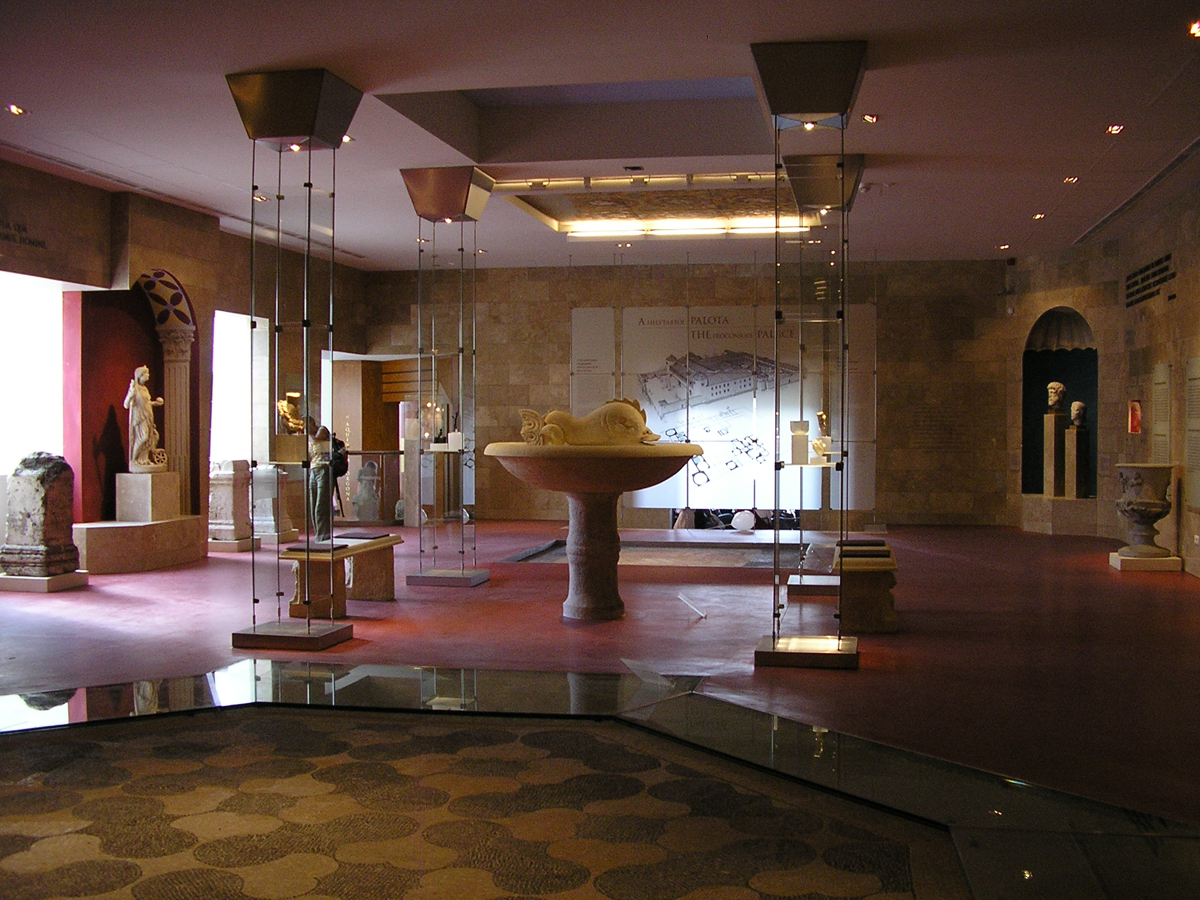
Aquincum Museum (Aquincum was the capital of Pannonia.)

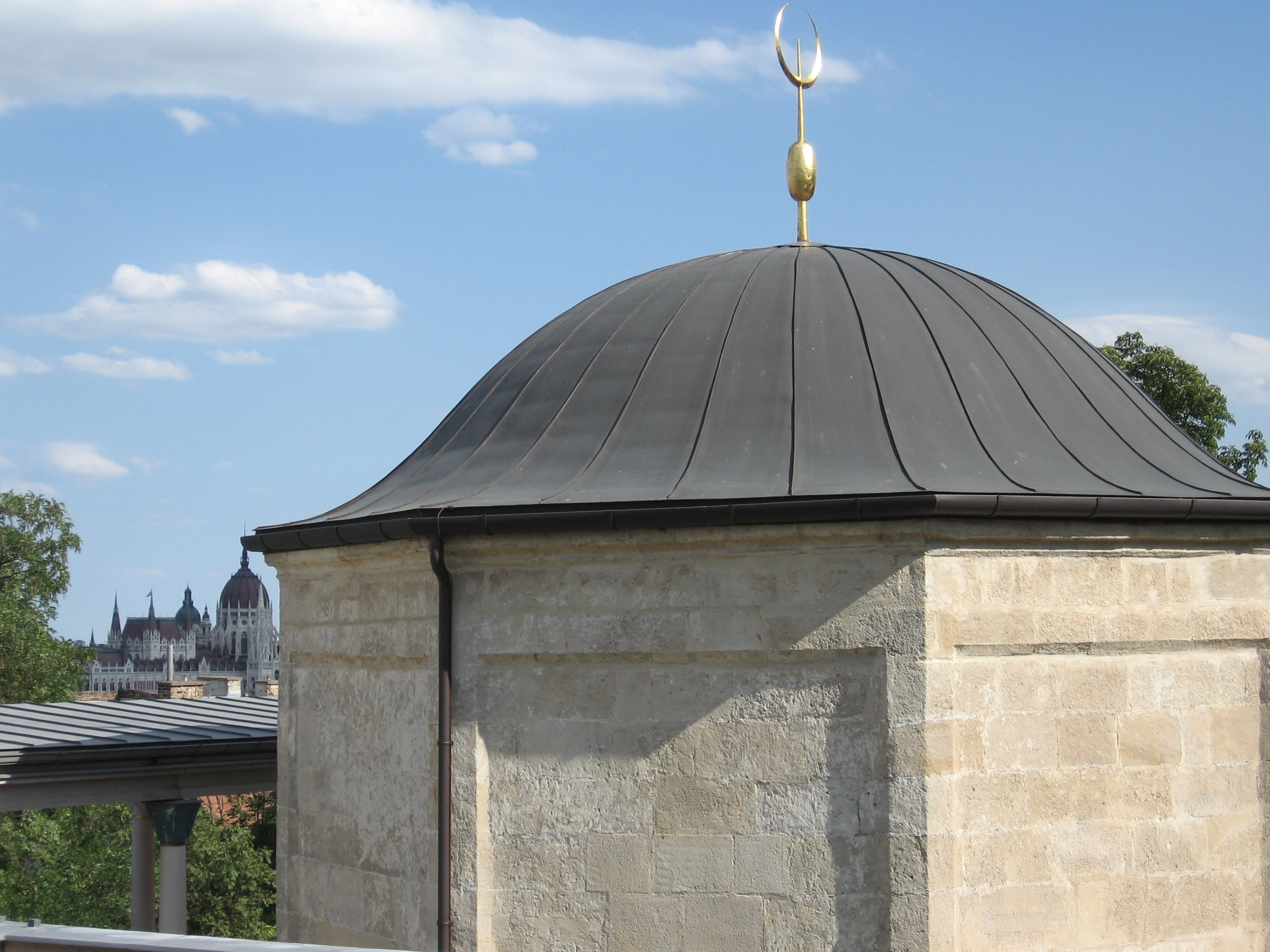
The tomb of the Turkish dervish Gül Baba in Budapest

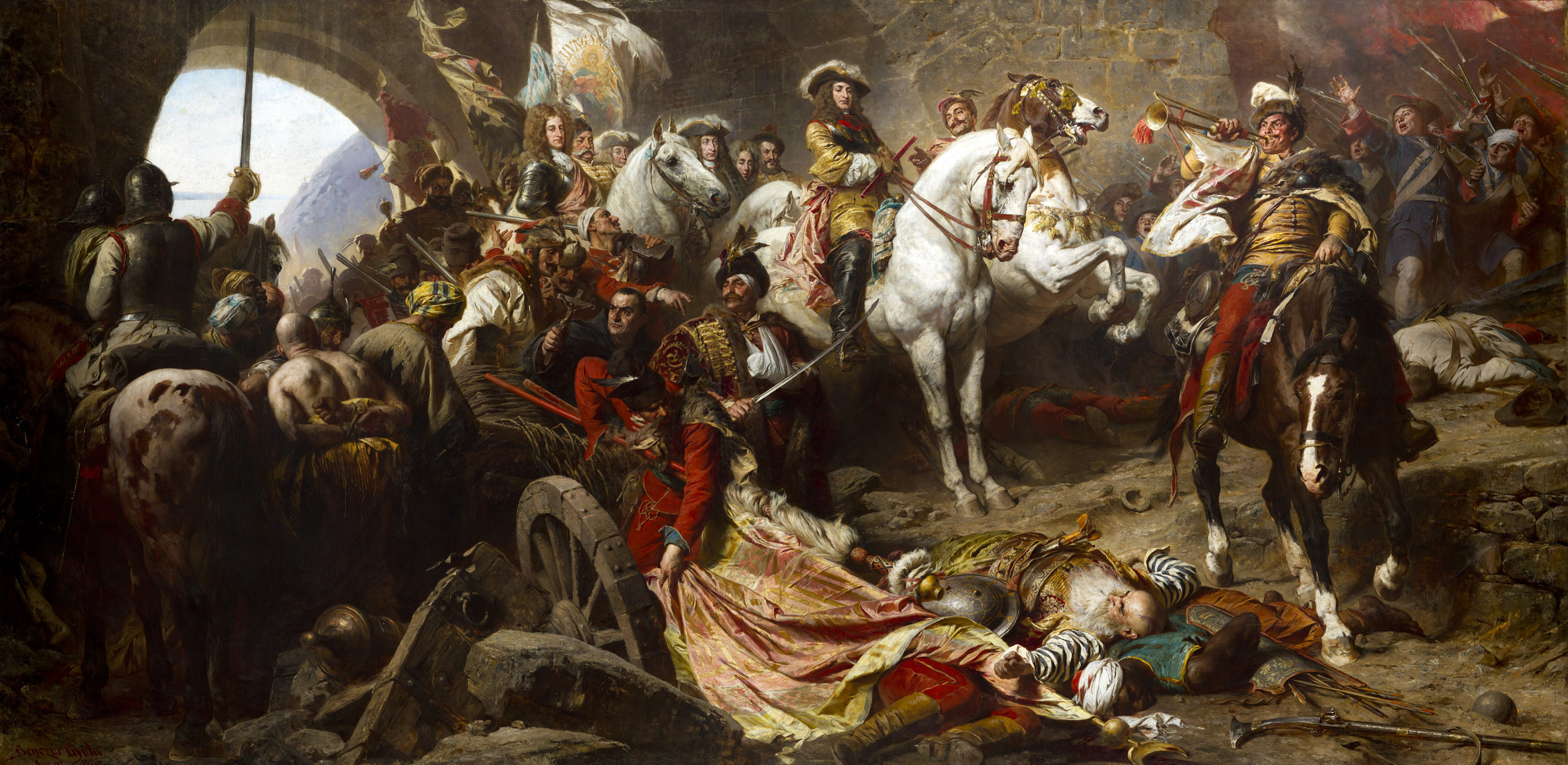
The Recapture of Buda Castle (1686)

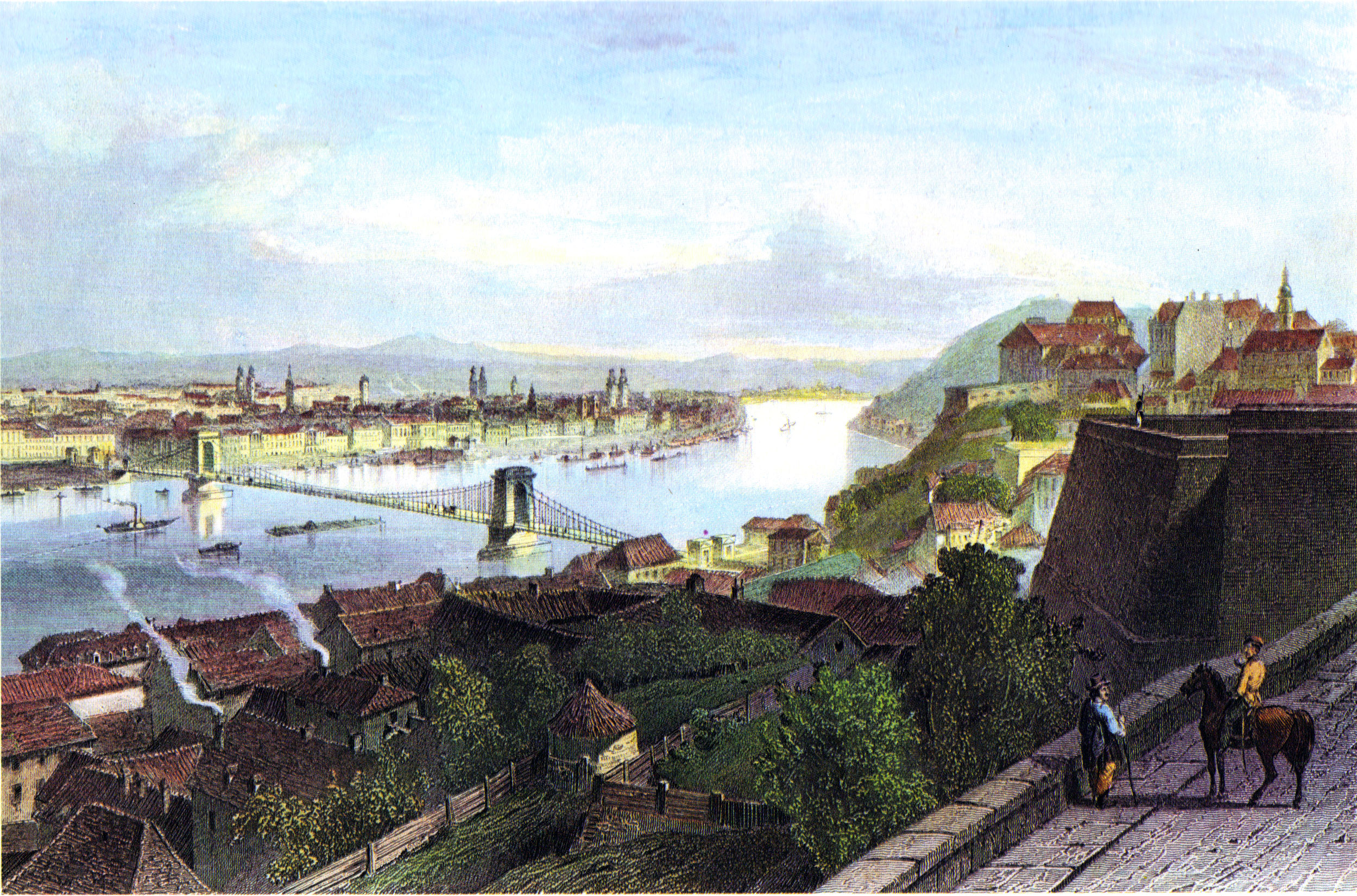
Buda and Pest (ca. 1850)

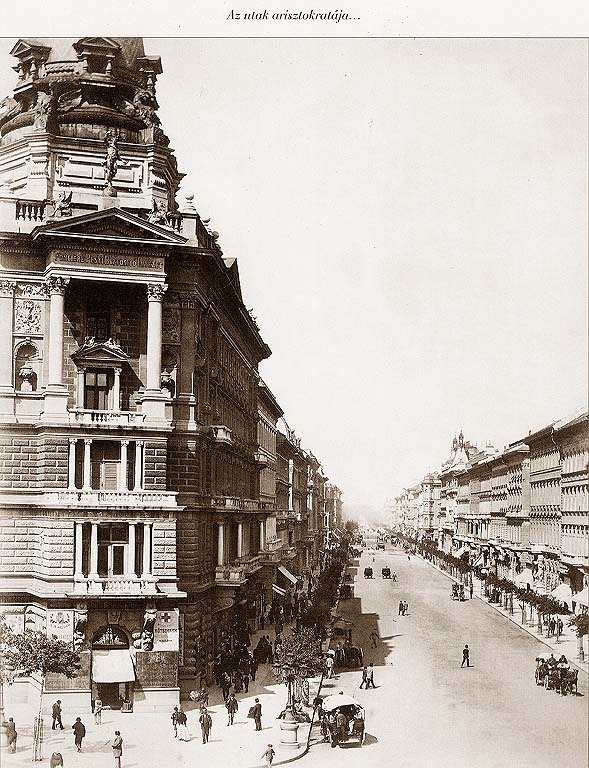
Andrássy Avenue (1896)

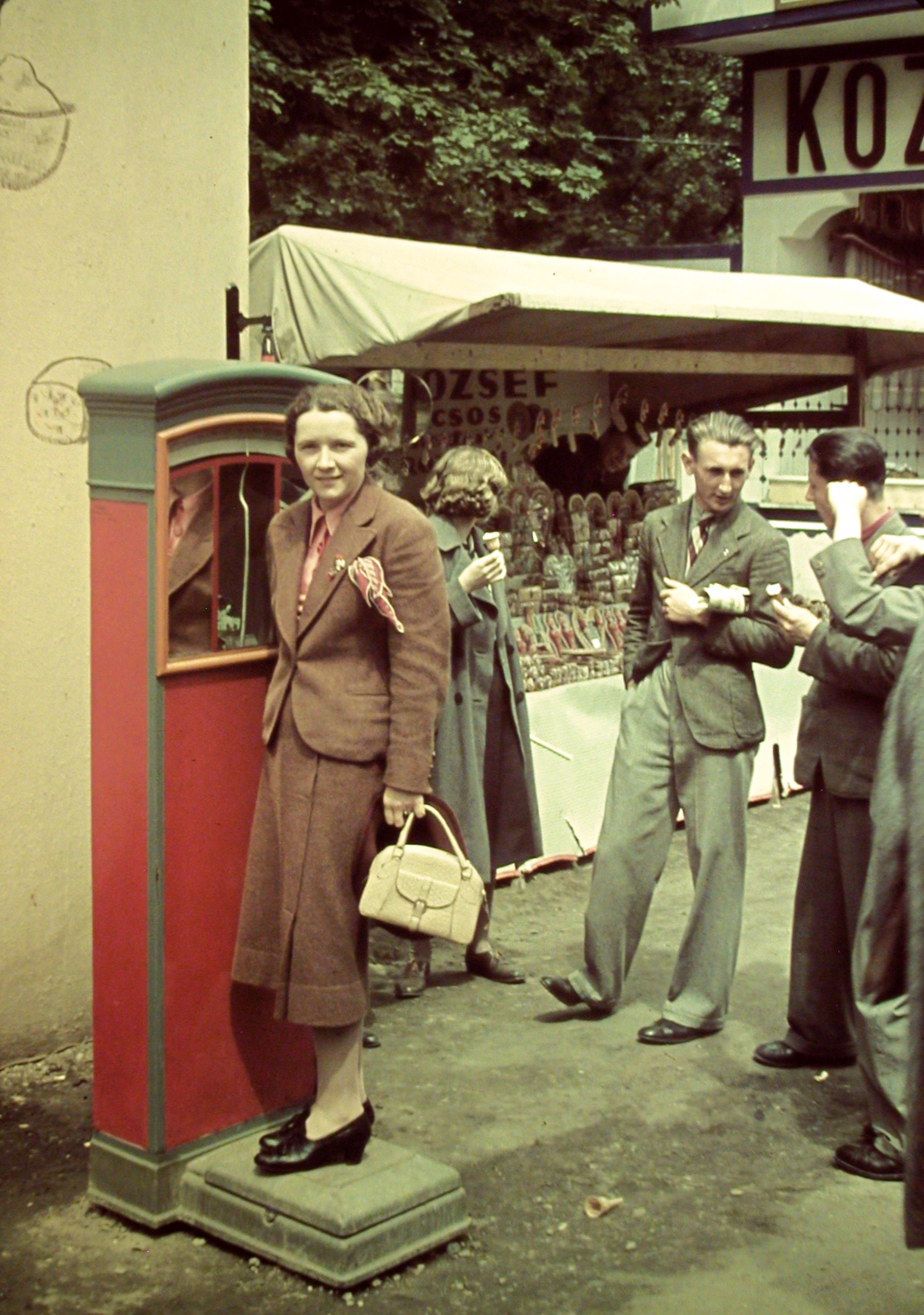
Budapest, City Park (1939)

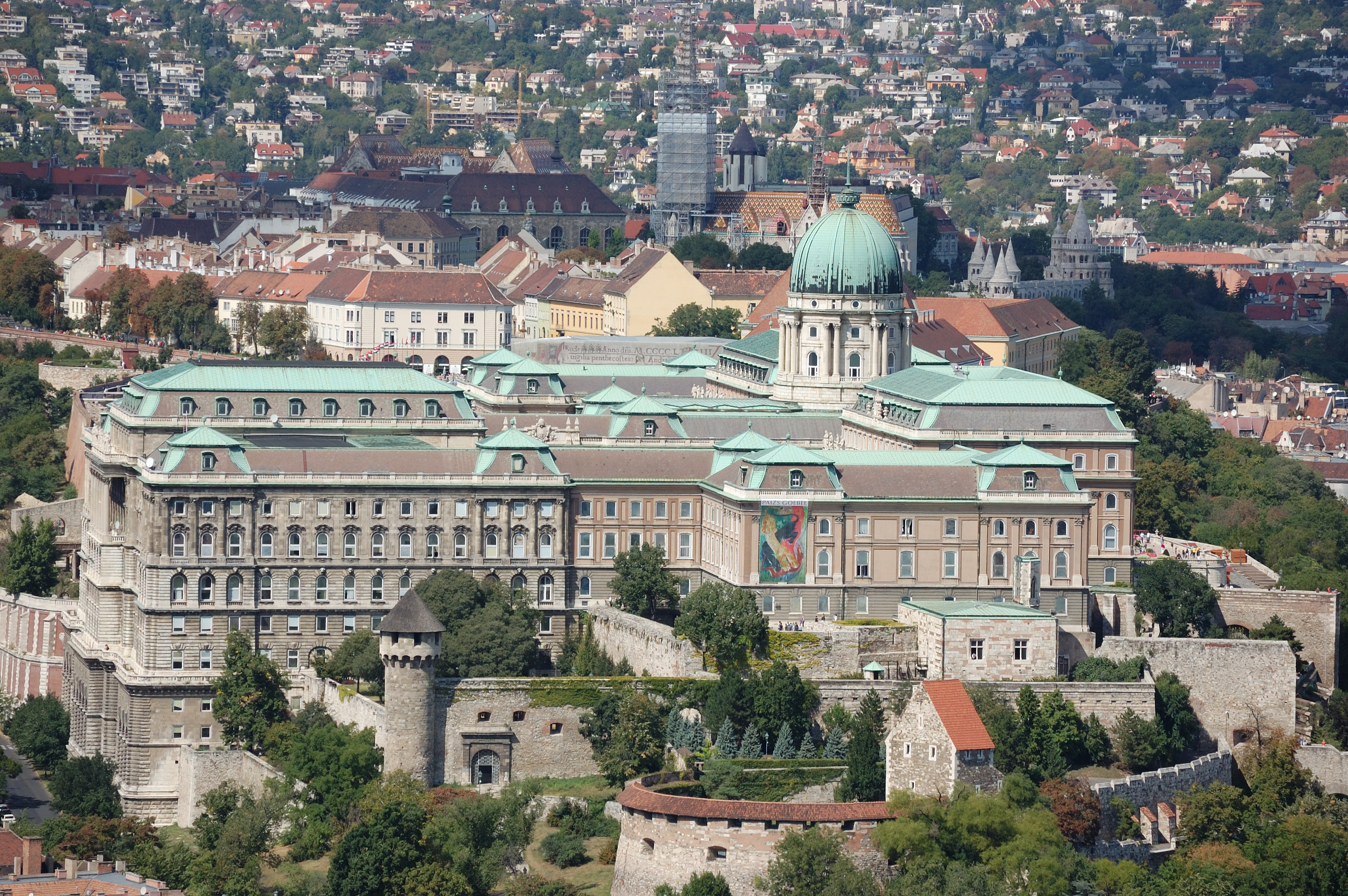
Buda Castle Daytime

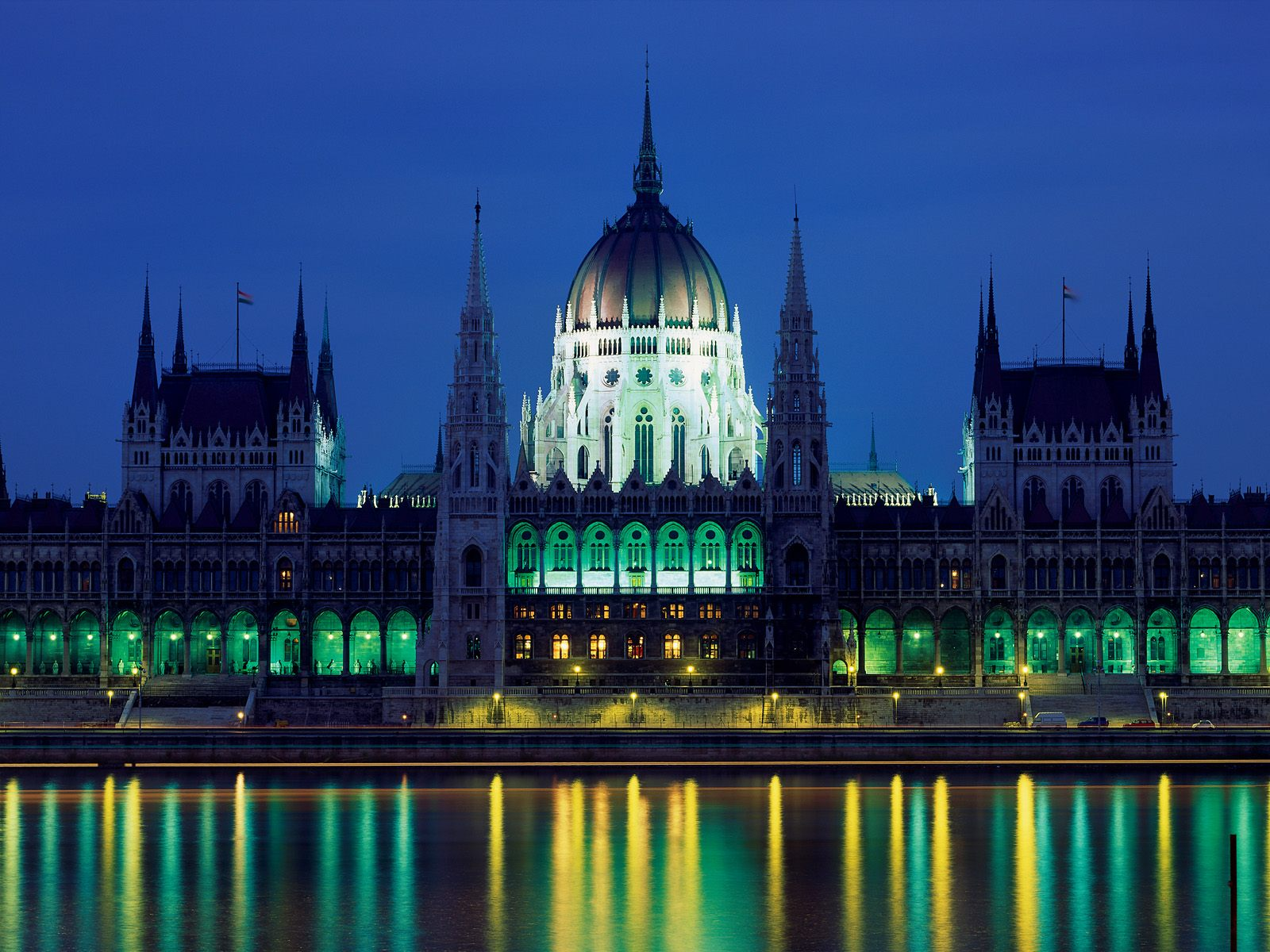
Parliament Building

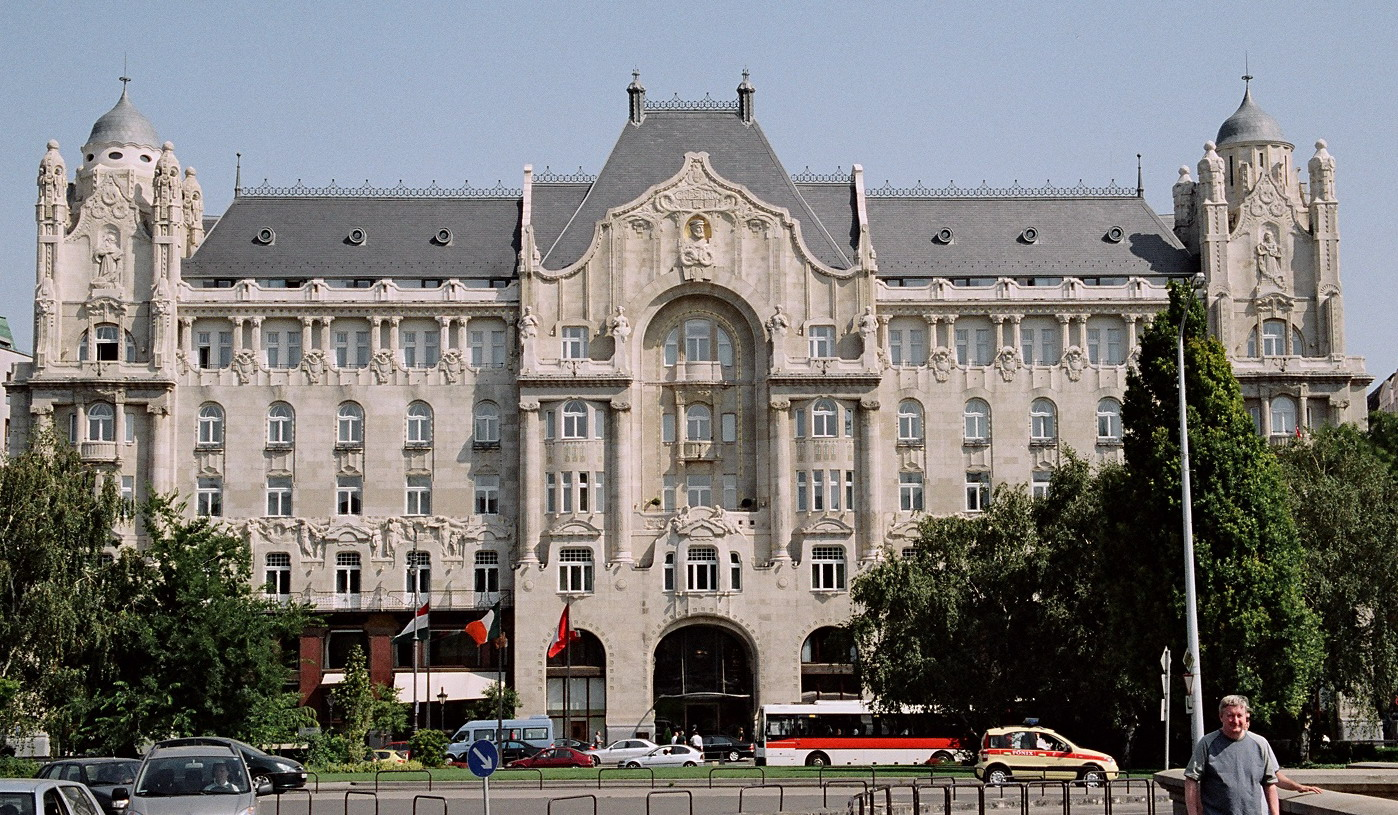
Gresham Palace

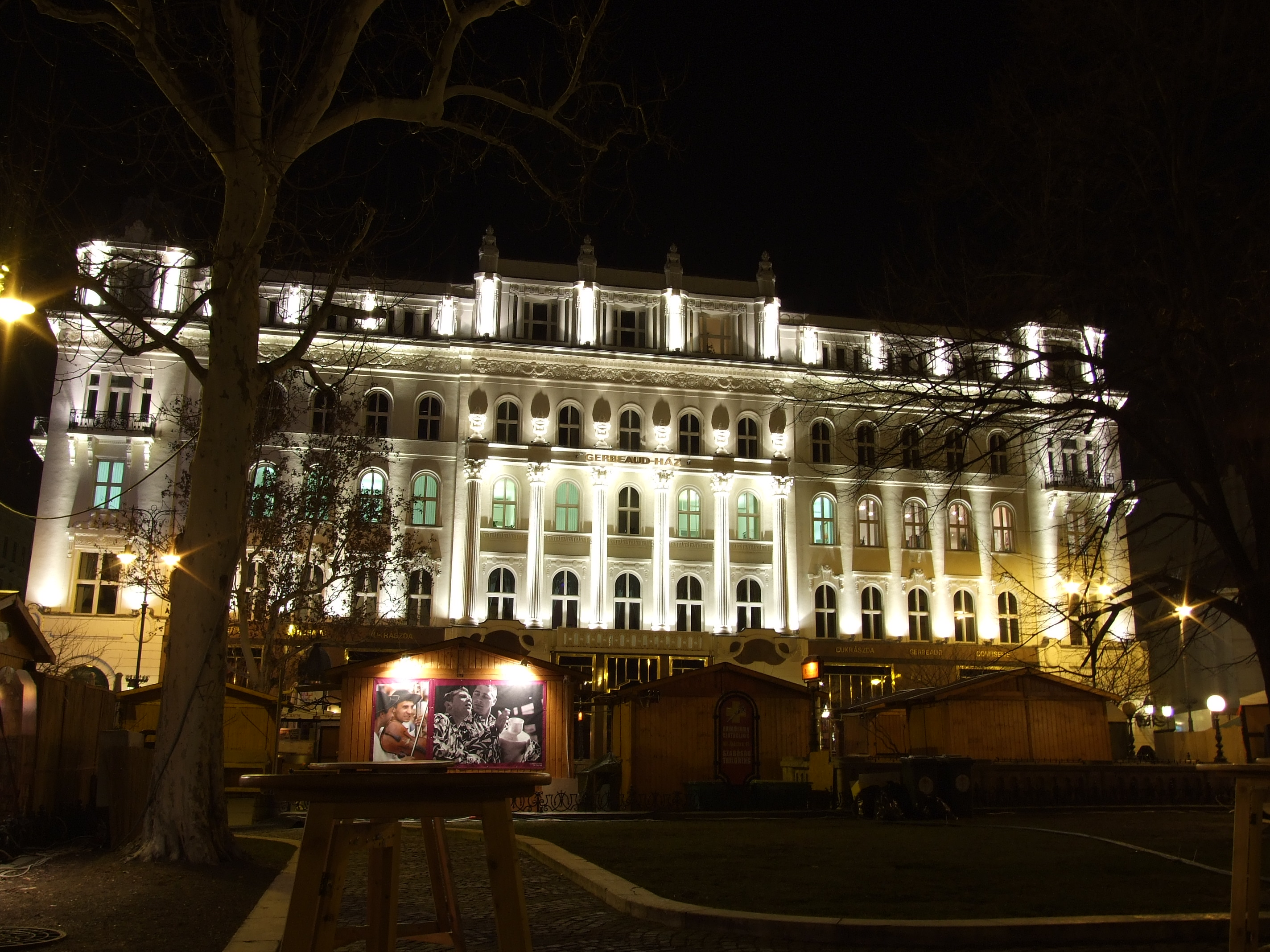
Gerbeaud Confectionery
