= Szolnok–Kiskunfélegyháza railway =

Railway line in Hungary

Szolnok–Kecskemét railway
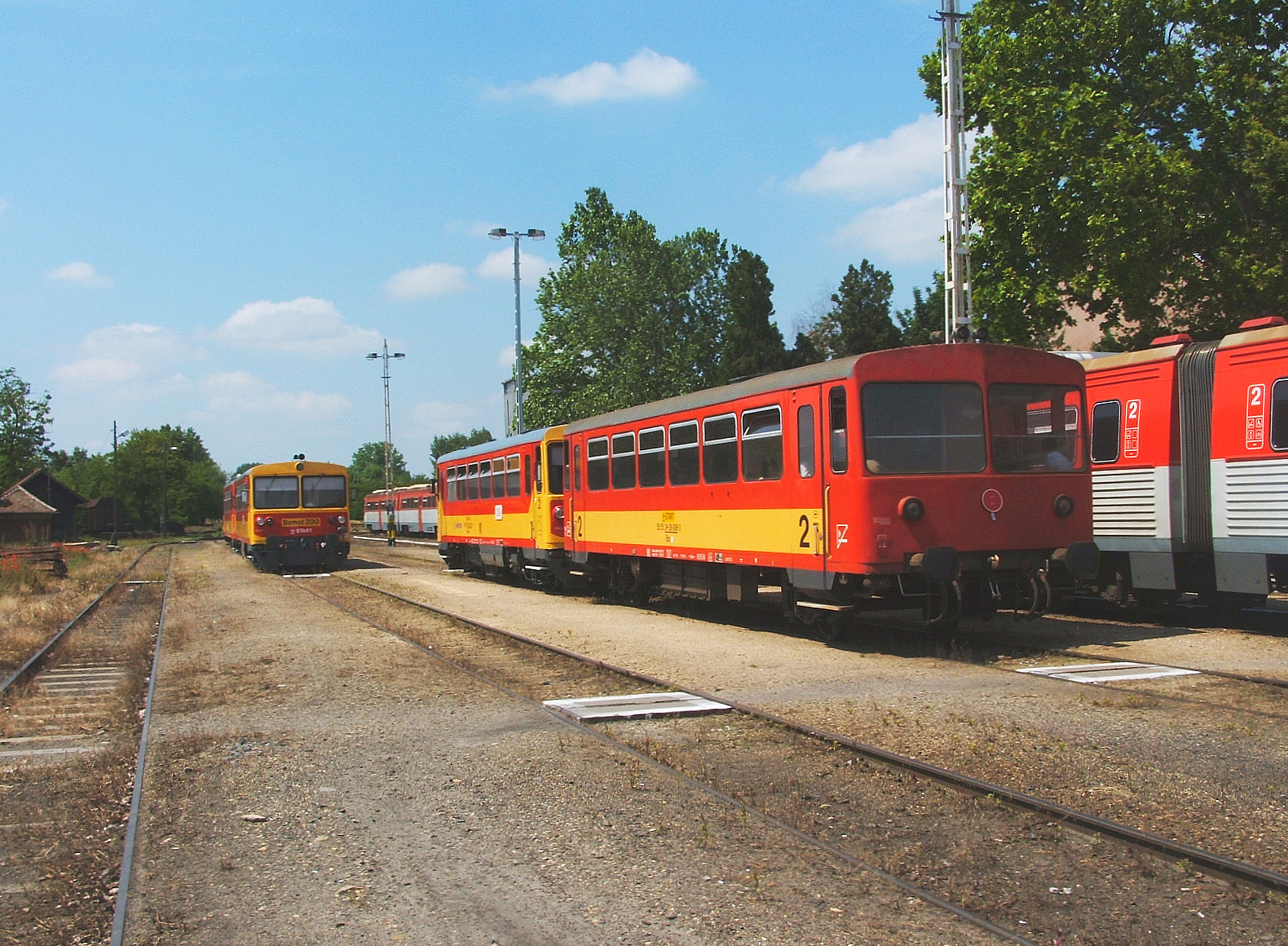
- Lakitelek railway station

Overview
- Status: Operational
- Owner: MÁV
- Line number: 145
- Locale: Hungary
- Termini: Szolnok; Kecskemét
- Stations: 8 stations & 12 stops
- Website: Timetable

Service
- Operator(s): MÁV
- Depot(s): Szolnok
- Daily ridership: 7

History
- Opened: 1896-1897

Technical
- Line length: 67 km
- Track length: 66.011 km (41.017 mi)
- Number of tracks: 1
- Track gauge: 1,435 mm (4 ft 8 1/2 in) standard gauge
- Operating speed: max. 60 km/h (37.3 mph)

The Szolnok–Kecskemét railway (Hungarian: Szolnok–Kecskemét-vasútvonal) is the number 145 line. The line from Szolnok to Kecskemét is 66.0 km long. The first sections of the railway line opened in 1896 between Kecskemét and Lakitelek. The second section between Lakitelek and Szolnok opened in 1897.

== See also ==
- List of railway lines in Hungary
