= Budapest–Szolnok–Debrecen–Nyíregyháza–Záhony railway =

Railway line in Hungary

Budapest–Záhony railway

Overview
- Owner: MÁV
- Line number: 100a (Budapest—Szolnok); 100 (Szolnok–Záhony)
- Termini: Budapest Nyugati; Záhony

History
- Opened: 1 September 1847

Technical
- Line length: 335 km (208 mi)
- Track gauge: 1,435 mm (4 ft 8 1/2 in)
- Electrification: 25 kV AC Overhead line
- Operating speed: 120 km/h (75 mph)

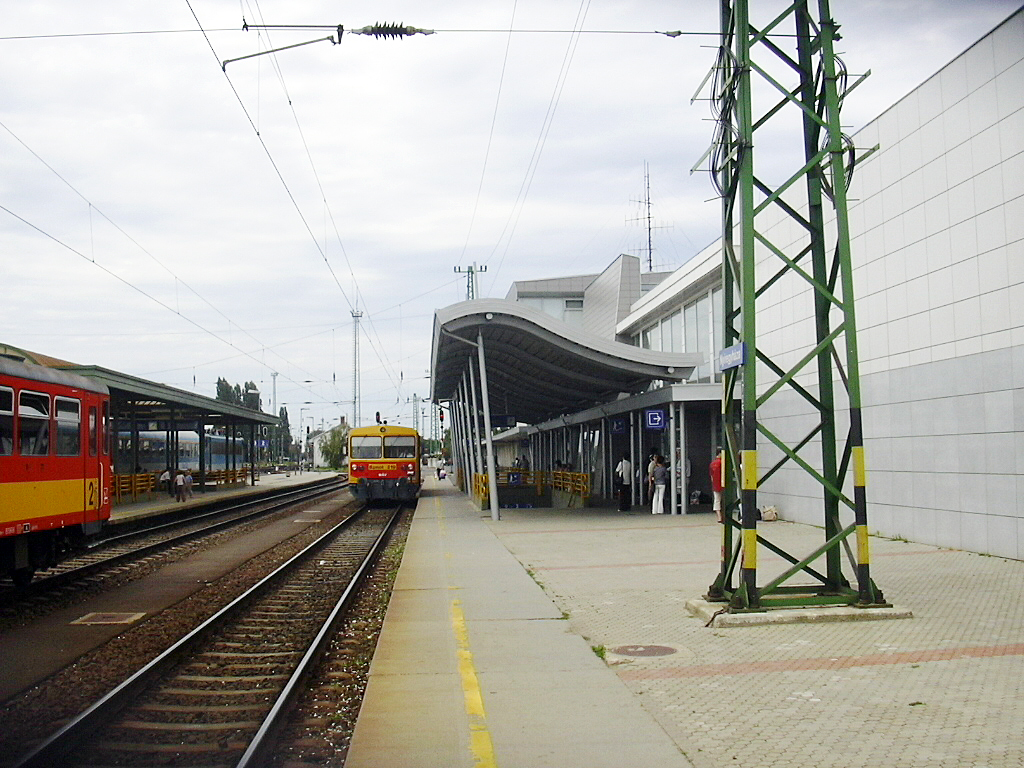
Nyíregyháza railway station

The railway line from Budapest to Záhony via Szolnok, Debrecen and Nyíregyháza is Hungarian State Railways line 100. It is 335 kilometres (208 mi) in length and is a double-track main line with 25 kV/50 Hz electrification. The northern section, from Nyíregyháza to Záhony, is designated 100b.

From Szolnok there is a rail connection to Budapest. The Szolnok - Záhony line has become known for the so-called Fekete vonat (black train) which brings labourers to the capital and has been the scene of fights.

== History ==
The initial 98-km segment between Pest and Szolnok was built by the Magyar Középponti Vasút (Central Hungarian Railway) and opened on 1 September 1847. Construction was interrupted by the 1848-49 war of independence and was resumed by the newly formed Tiszavidéki Vasút (Theiss Railway). The Szolnok - Debrecen segment opened on 25 November 1857 and the segment from Debrecen to Miskolc via Nyíregyháza on 24 May 1859. Since January 1855, the ownership and operations-right of the section Budapest–Szolnok had been obtained by the Imperial Royal Privileged Austrian State Railway Company (StEG) in the association with constructing the section Szeged–Temesvár.
