= Rail transport in Hungary =

Rail network in Hungary
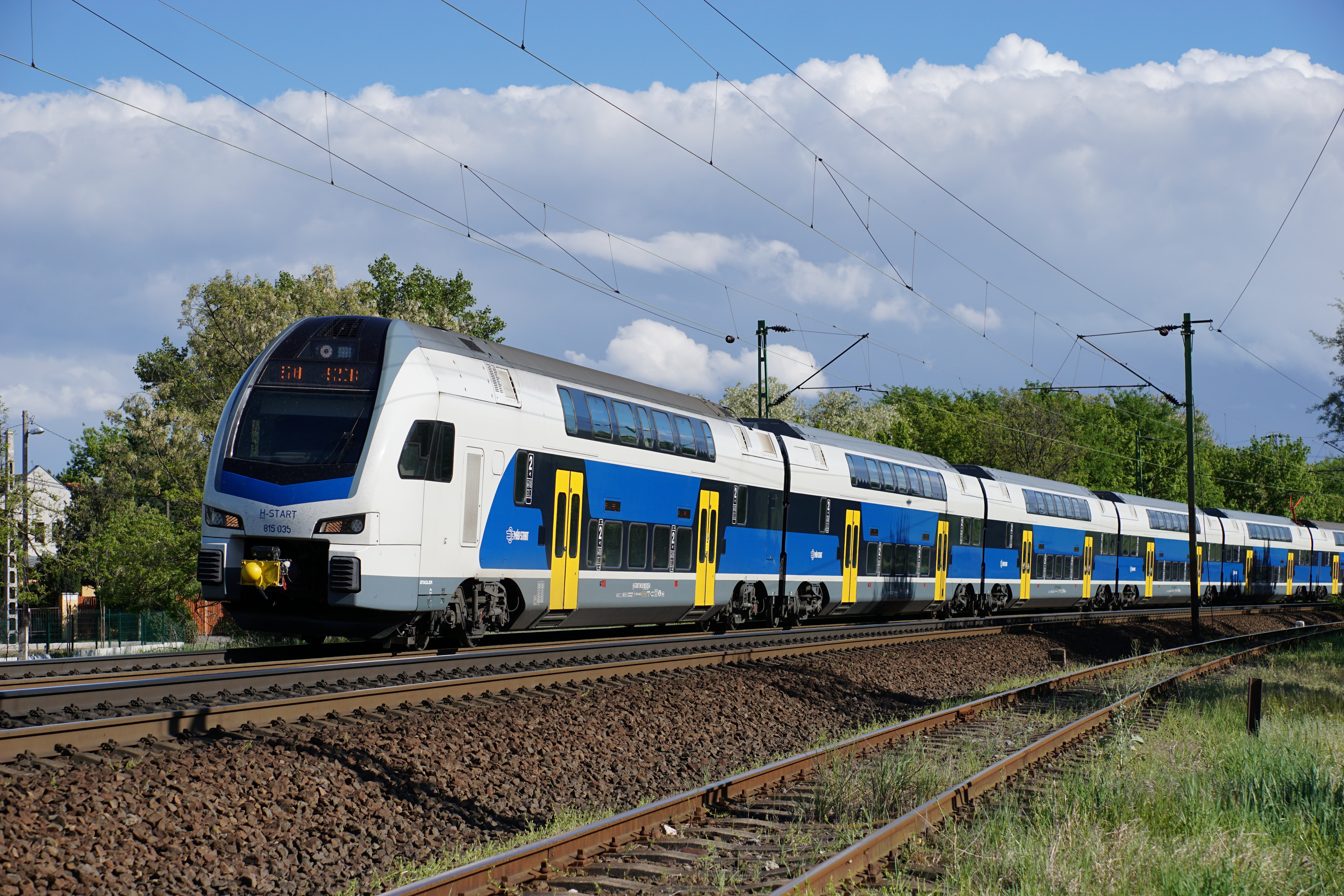

Operation
- National railway: Magyar Államvasutak (MÁV)

Statistics
- Ridership: 110 million (2017)

System length
- Total: 8,057 kilometres (5,006 mi)
- Double track: 1,335 kilometres (830 mi)
- Electrified: 3,060 kilometres (1,900 mi)
- High-speed: 0 kilometres (0 mi)

Track gauge
- Main: 1,435 mm (4 ft 8 1/2 in)

Electrification
- Main: 25 kV 50 Hz AC overhead line

Features
- No. of tunnels: 21
- Longest tunnel: Kopár-hágó tunnel 780 metres (2,560 ft)
- Longest bridge: Nagyrákos viadukt 1,399 metres (4,590 ft)
Map
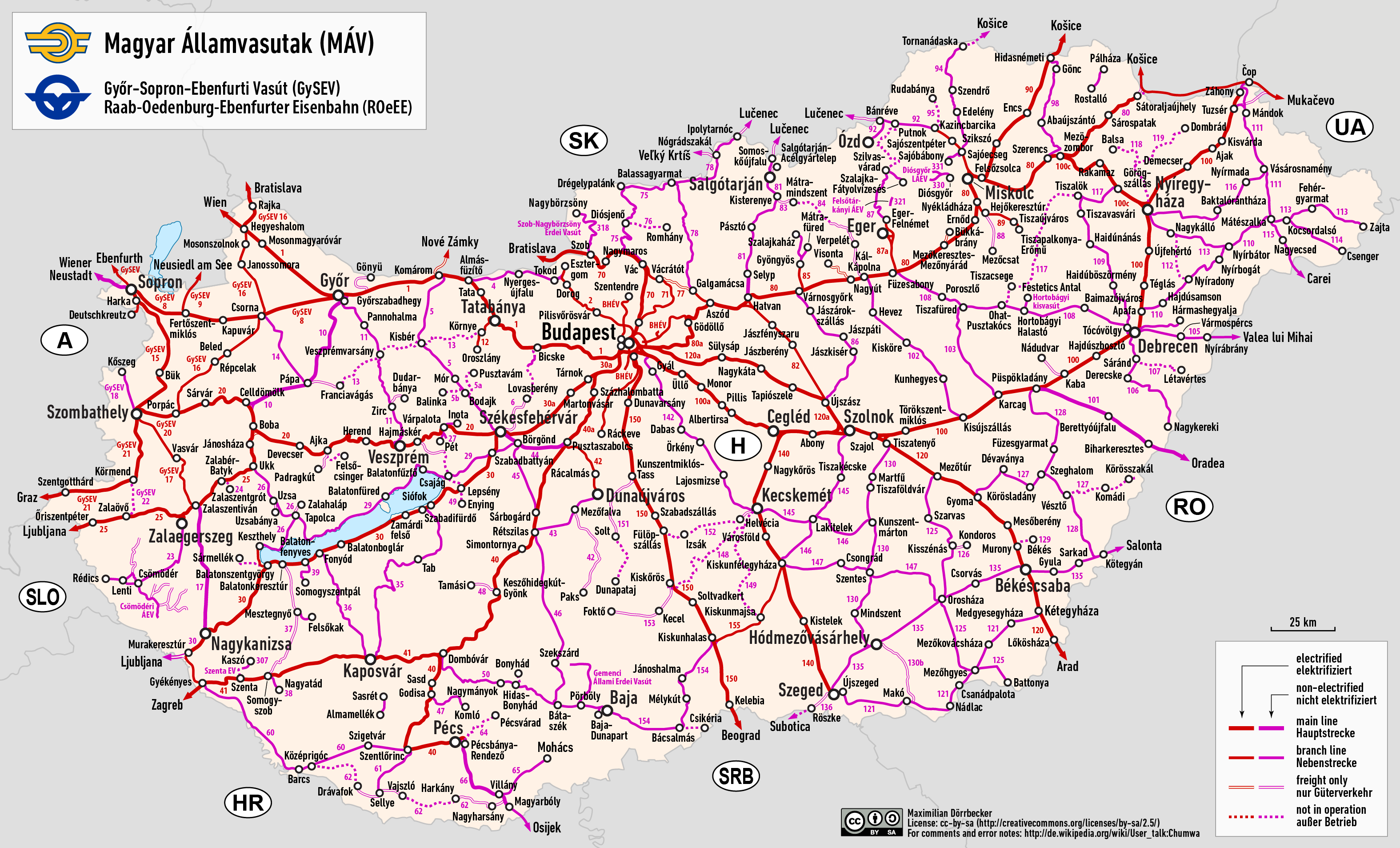

Rail transport in Hungary is mainly owned by the national rail company MÁV, with a significant portion of the network owned and operated by GySEV.

The railway network of Hungary consists of 7,893 km (4,904 mi), its gauge is 1,435 mm (4 ft 8 1/2 in) standard gauge and 3,060 km (1,900 mi) are electrified.

Hungary is a member of the International Union of Railways (UIC). The UIC country code for Hungary is 55.

== Statistics ==
- Railway lines total: 7,606 km (4,726 mi)
  - Standard gauge: 7,394 km (4,594 mi)
  - Broad gauge: 36 km (22 mi) of 1,520 mm (4 ft 11 27/32 in)
  - Narrow gauge: 176 km (109 mi)

Note: The standard and broad gauge railways are operated by the State Railways and also the following narrow gauge railways: Nyíregyháza–Balsai Tisza part/Dombrád; Balatonfenyves–Somogyszentpál; Kecskemét–Kiskunmajsa/Kiskőrös and the Children's Railway in Budapest. All the other narrow gauge railways are run by State Forest companies or local non-profit organisations. See also Narrow gauge railways in Hungary.

=== Financial performance and corporate statistics ===
- Revenue = 372,549 million Ft (2014)
- Net income = 22,851 million Ft (2014)
- Number of employees = 38,456 (2009)
- Owner = Hungarian state (100% state ownership)

=== Rail links to adjacent countries ===
Same gauge:

- Austria — voltage change 25 kV AC / 15 kV AC
- Croatia — same voltage 25 kV AC
- Romania — same voltage 25 kV AC
- Serbia — same voltage 25 kV AC
- Slovakia — same voltage 25 kV AC (west) and 3 kV DC (east)
- Slovenia — voltage change 25 kV AC / 3 kV DC

Break-of-gauge (1,520 mm (4 ft 11 27/32 in):

- Ukraine — no electrified rail link

== Modern and historical railway maps ==
Maps of railways in Hungary
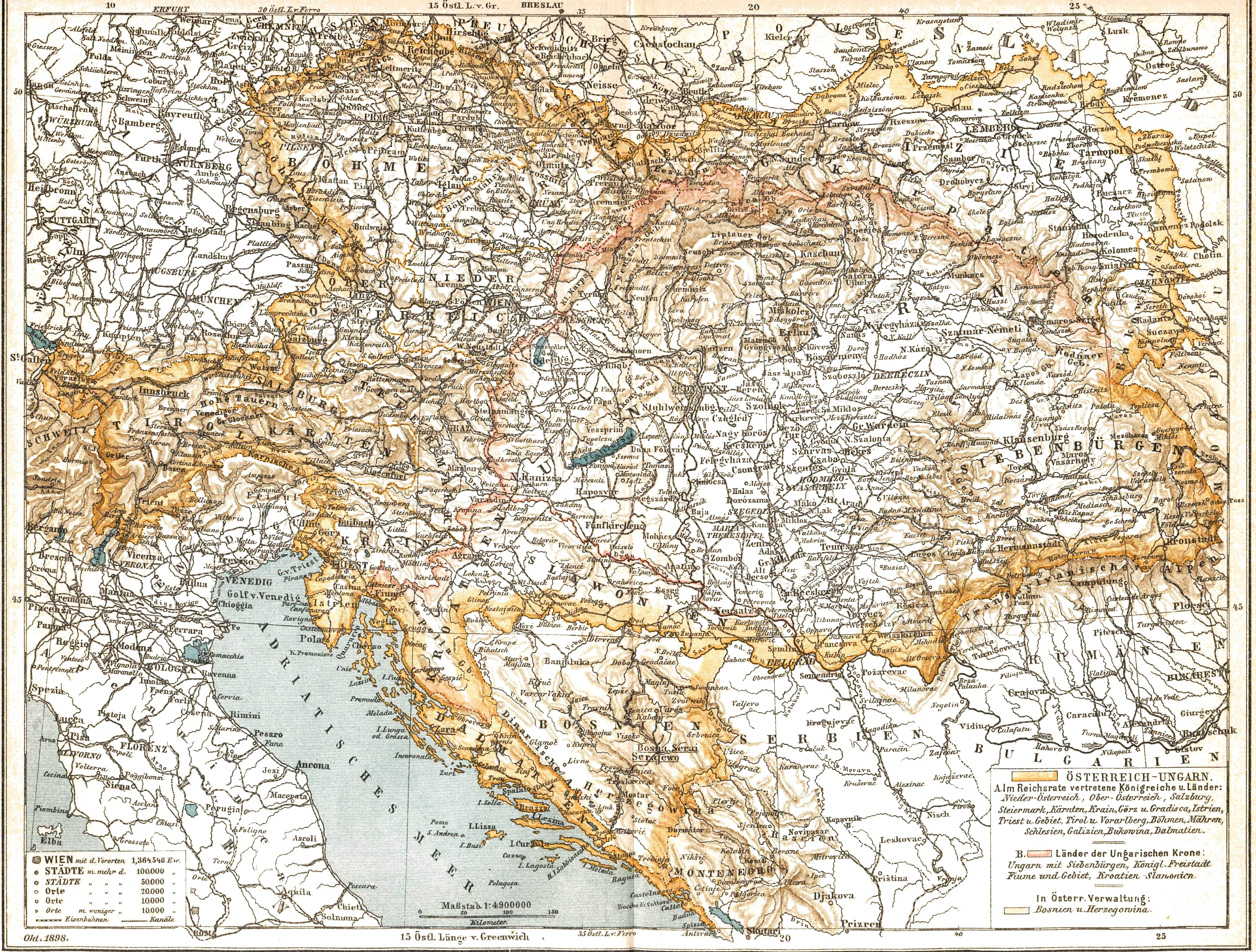
1898 railway map of Austria-Hungary

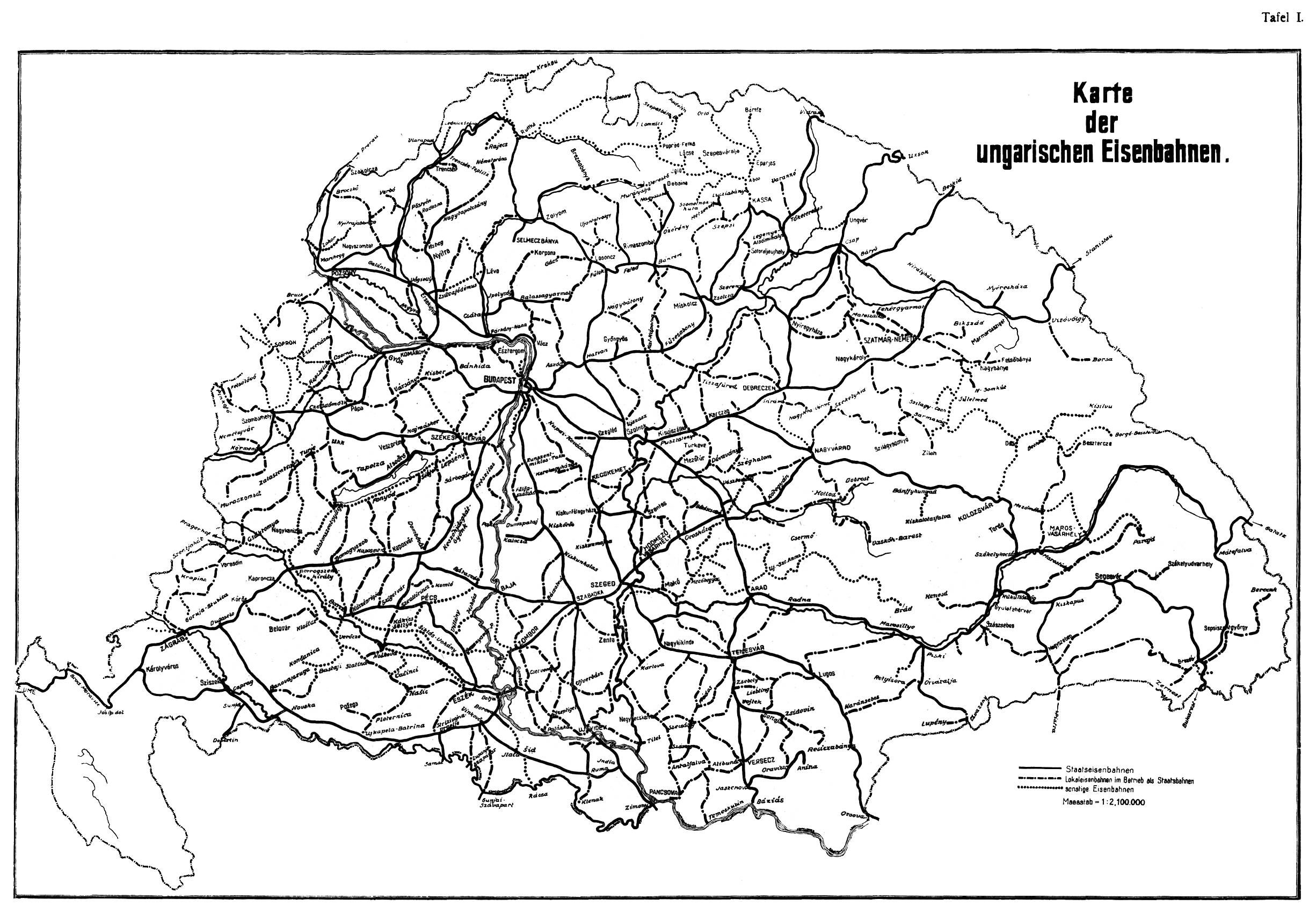
1912 railway map of Kingdom of Hungary

Electrified railways in Hungary

== Urban rail ==
=== Commuter ===
The largest agglomeration of Hungary has a suburban rail system:

City	System	Operator	Electrification	Conductor system	Gauge	Bidirectional traffic
Budapest	BHÉV	MÁV–HÉV	1000 V DC	Overhead line	1,435 mm (4 ft 8 1/2 in) standard gauge	Right-hand traffic (with the exception of lines H8 and H9)

=== Metro ===
The largest city in Hungary has a Metro system:

City	System	Electrification	Conductor system	Gauge	Bidirectional traffic	Opened
Budapest	Budapest Metro	550 V DC (M1); 750 V DC (M4); 825 V DC (M2, M3)	Overhead line (M1); Third rail (M2, M3, M4)	1,435 mm (4 ft 8 1/2 in) standard gauge	Right-hand traffic	3 May 1896

=== Tram ===
There are also tram systems in the following cities:

City	System	Electrification	Operator	Gauge	Bidirectional traffic	Opened
Budapest	Budapest Tram	600 V DC	BKV	1,435 mm (4 ft 8 1/2 in) standard gauge	Right-hand traffic	30 July 1866
Debrecen	Debrecen Tram	600 V DC	DKV	1,435 mm (4 ft 8 1/2 in) standard gauge	Right-hand traffic	16 March 1911
Miskolc	Miskolc Tram	600 V DC	MVK	1,435 mm (4 ft 8 1/2 in) standard gauge	Right-hand traffic	10 July 1897
Szeged	Szeged Tram	600 V DC	SZKT	1,435 mm (4 ft 8 1/2 in) standard gauge	Right-hand traffic	1 July 1884
Hódmezővásárhely	Szeged-Hódmezővásárhely Tram-train	600 V DC	MÁV-Start	1,435 mm (4 ft 8 1/2 in) standard gauge	Right-hand traffic	29 November 2021

== See also ==
- List of railway lines in Hungary
- Transport in Hungary
- Hungarian State Railways
- List of Hungarian locomotives
