= Balatonfenyves narrow-gauge railway =

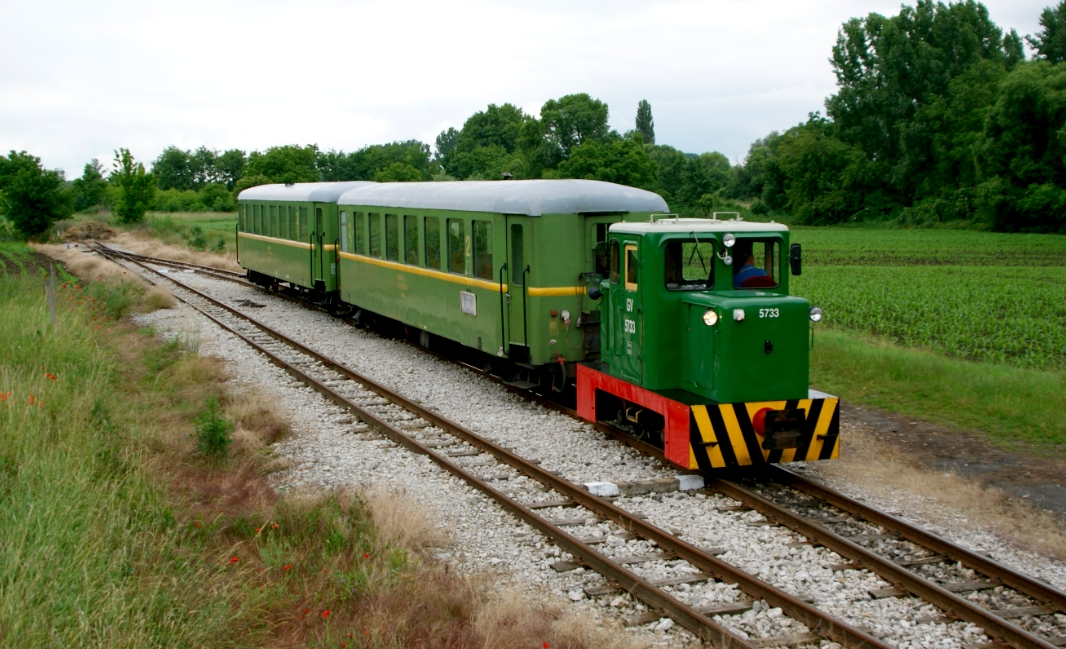
- Passenger train at Somogyszentpál station

Overview
- Locale: Hungary
- Termini: Balatonfenyves; Somogyszentpál

Service
- Operator(s): Hungarian State Railways

Technical
- Line length: 14 km (9 mi)
- Track gauge: 760 mm (2 ft 5 15/16 in) Bosnian gauge

The Balatonfenyves narrow-gauge railway runs from Balatonfenyves on the South shore of Lake Balaton to Somogyszentpál over a distance of 13 km. It is the last remaining MÁV-operated narrow-gauge railroad of Hungary as of 2017.

== History ==
The surroundings of the railroad were originally part of the Lake Balaton, but later it became an isolated moorland that was drained in the 1860s. After that, local landowners tried to connect their lands with the outside world, but they had difficulties with the muddy terrain.

The first local line was a 4 km long, 600 mm gauge railroad that connected Balatonfenyves' normal gauge rail station with Imremajor. It used horses instead of locomotives, and there was no passenger traffic. During World War II, it was destroyed.

The need for the railroad was still very strong (with no paved road in the area), therefore the construction of a new, 760 mm gauge railway was started in 1950. It was one of the latest railroads of the GV (local, mainly freight-purposed narrow-gauge train) system in the country.

Passenger traffic was installed in 1956. Operation was transferred to the state railways in 1960.

Although the 1968 Transportation Policy Conception put an end to nearly all the GV lines, Balatonfenyves was the sole GV to see a passenger growth, mainly because of the tourists from the Balaton area and those going to the Csiszta spa (a new terminus closer to the spa was opened in 1988). The freight traffic ended in 1990, resulting in the demolition of several branch lines.

The heavy carriages and the steam engines on the relatively small rails caused damage on the track, becoming heavier and heavier. After drastically reducing the speed limit, two of the three lines (Csisztapuszta, Táska) were closed in September 2002. The only remaining line, from Balatonfenyves to Somogyszentpál was renovated later that year.

In late 2009, the fate of the line, along with the two other MÁV-operated narrow-gauge railroad, became questionable, but unlike the Kecskemét and Nyíregyháza networks, it remained in operation. The branch to Csisztapuszta reopened in 2021.

== Importance ==
This small but very important train transports not only tourists in the summer but locals to and from their place of work all year round. It connects with the main line Balatonfenyves where you can travel anywhere in Europe. Somogyszentpál where it terminates is a somewhat cosmopolitan village with Europeans from Austria, England, Germany, Switzerland to name but a few countries and a mix of Hungarian people. The possibilities of such a diverse cultural village is yet to be realised. The Trainline has a big part to play in the village.
