= V43 =

V43 may refer to:

- MÁV Class V43, a locomotive
- SMS V43, a torpedo boat of the Imperial German Navy
- Vanadium-43, an isotope of vanadium
- V^{4}_{3}, the second inversion of the dominant seventh chord
