= László Polgár (bass) =

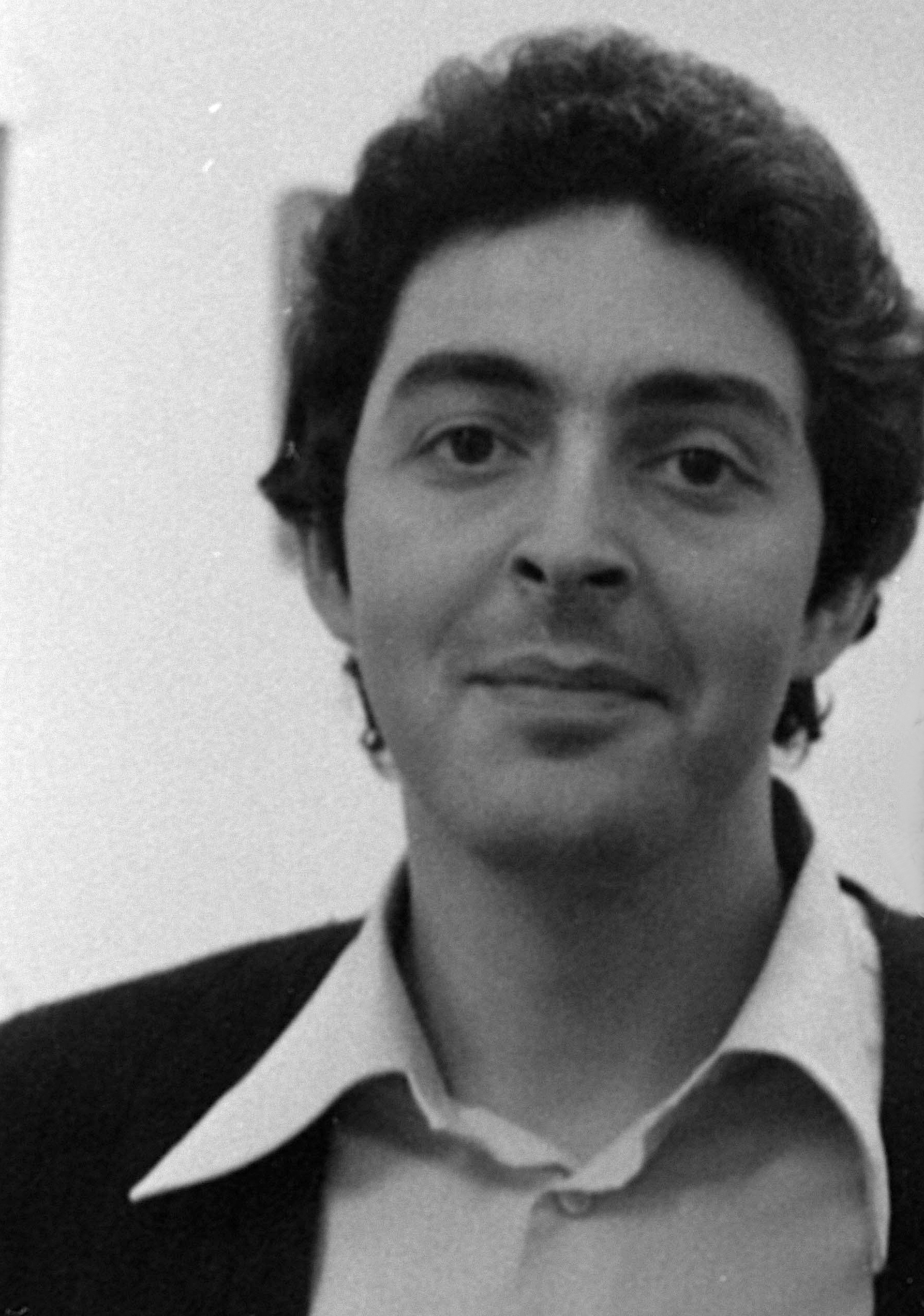
Polgár in 1977

László Polgár (1 January 1947 – 19 September 2010) was a Hungarian operatic bass. He was a singer in the Opera, Oratorio and Lieder genres and was renowned for his silky voice and outstanding declamation and musicality. His art is well represented on compact disc, particularly in opera.

== Biography ==
Polgár was born to Jewish parents Lajos Polgár and Anna Kántor in Somogyszentpál. He studied with Eva Kutrucz at the Franz Liszt Academy of Music, 1967–72, and later privately with Hans Hotter and Yevgeny Nesterenko. He made his debut at the Hungarian State Opera in 1971, as Count Ceprano in Rigoletto. His other roles there included Osmin, Sarastro, Leporello, Basilio, and Gurnemanz.

His international career took off in 1981, when he sang Rodolfo in La sonnambula at the Royal Opera House in London. He became a regular guest at the Vienna State Opera in 1983, at the Munich State Opera and the Opéra de Paris from 1985; also, he appeared in Hamburg State Opera, and at the festivals of Salzburg and Aix-en-Provence. From 1992 until 2008 he was a principal solo bass of the Zurich Opera House.

Other notable roles of his included Oroveso, Giorgio, Il Prefetto, Walter, Padre Guardiano, and Filippo. He is perhaps best known for his interpretation of the title role in Bartók's Bluebeard's Castle, which he sang several times with distinction, and also recorded with soprano Jessye Norman, conductor Pierre Boulez, and the Chicago Symphony Orchestra.

In 1986 he played the double role of Sarastro and Man with Greying Hair in A Hungarian Fairy Tale (Hol volt, hol nem volt ...) in the Hungarian film directed by Gyula Gazdag.

Polgár taught at the Hochschule für Musik in Winterthur, Switzerland, and also at the Franz Liszt Academy in Budapest.

He died in Zürich in 2010, at the age of 63. He is buried at the Kozma Street Jewish Cemetery in Budapest.

== Sources ==
- Grove Music Online, Peter Varnai & Alan Blyth, Oxford University Press, 2008.
- Bach-Cantatas, Aryeh Oron & Maria Langsch, August 2001.
