= Somogyszentpál =

Somogyszentpál Tótszentpál (until 1929) Sempal (in Croatian)
- Village
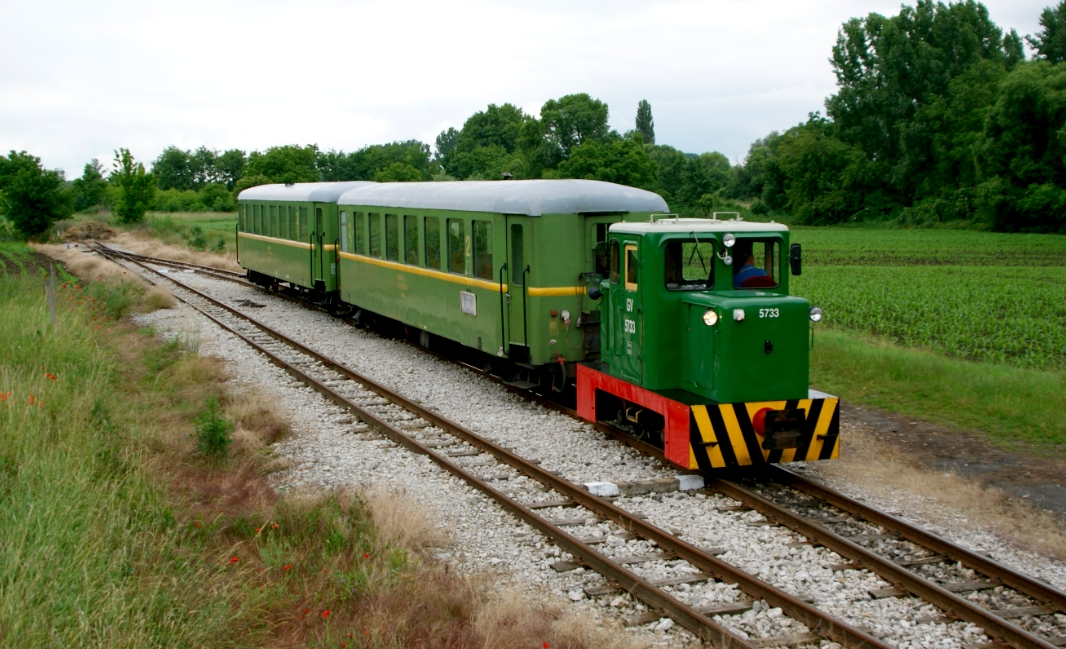
- Train on the Balatonfenyves narrow-gauge railway in Somogyszentpál

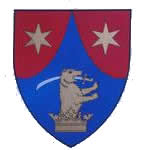
- Coat of arms

- Location of Somogyszentpál
- Coordinates: 46.64008°N 17.47370°E
- Country: Hungary
- Region: Southern Transdanubia
- County: Somogy
- District: Marcali
- RC Diocese: Kaposvár

Area
  - Total: 28.96 km^{2} (11.18 sq mi)

Population (2017)
  - Total: 789
  - Density: 27.2/km^{2} (70.6/sq mi)
- Demonym(s): szentpáli, somogyszentpáli
- Time zone: UTC+1 (CET)
  - Summer (DST): UTC+2 (CEST)
- Postal code: 8705
- Area code: (+36) 85
- NUTS 3 code: HU232
- MP: József Attila Móring (KDNP)
- Website: Somogyszentpál Online

Somogyszentpál (until 1929 as Tótszentpál, Croatian: Sempal) is a village in Somogy County, Hungary.

== Geography ==
It lies southeast of Balatonkeresztúr and south of Balatonfenyves between Kéthely and Csömend. The village can be reached by car from Kéthely/Csömend, or by train from Balatonfenyves on the Balatonfenyves narrow-gauge railway.

== History ==
Somogyszentpál was formed by the unification of the two villages of Varjaskér and Tótszentpál in 1929. At that time it had 1,750 residents. There were also other villages during the Middle Ages on the territory of today's Somogyszentpál, but most of them disappeared during the Ottoman-Hungarian Wars like Thekeskér, Nyír-falu, Németi, Zobafalva, Gyulvez, Szent-György falu and Muszt.

=== Varjaskér ===
Varjaskér was first mentioned in 1226 as Ker and later as Keér between 1292 and 1321 in official documents. In the papal tithe register it was also mentioned between 1332 and 1337. The village had its own parish and own church which was built in the 13th century and stood until the 16th century. In 1536 it existed yet. But in 1736 several years after the Turkish occupation it was already a ruin. The first known owner of Varjaskér was János Rupolyi in 1356, then Miklós Felső Lendvai of the Gutkeled genus. Later it came into the hands of the Török family. Bálint Török was the landowner in 1535, then István Török from 1599. The Török family built a castle in the 16th century in the middle of the mash of Nagyberek. Its ruins can also be seen there.

Between 1660 and 1720 the village was in the hands of Miklós Sankó and his family, then from 1726 the Harrach family and finally between 1733 and 1945 the Hunyadi family. The Canonica Visitatio stated that in 1743 there was a huge church ruin outside the village with a tower. The notary of Varjaskér wrote in 1864 in his report that the church and the castle was fired by the Turks in Nagyberek during the Ottoman-Hungarian Wars. According to the census of 1849 Varjaskér had 754 inhabitants of whom all were Slavic-speaking, 743 Roman Catholics and 11 Jews.

=== Tótszentpál ===
Tótszentpál (earlier Pálfalva or Szentpál) was first mentioned in the papal tithe register in 1332 as Ecclesia a Sancto Paulo. Its name was found in 1356, 1466 and 1496 in official documents. Its first known owner was the Dombói family who sold the land to Imre Török de Enying. From 1660 the Sankó family, then László Pető, then the Esterházy family owned the village until 1945. During the 17th century after the Turkish occupation Slovenes settled in Tótszentpál. They came overwhelmingly from Prekmurje. There were also some Hungarian and Croatian families. According to the census of 1849 the 964 residents of Tótszentpál were all Slavic-speaking and Roman Catholic.

== Public life ==
Mayors:

- 1990–2019: Dr. Berényi Sándor
- 2019-: Poszáné Szabó Edit

== Institutions ==
- Kindergarten of Somogyszentpál --> www.facebook.com/tunderrozsaovi/
- Library

== Main sights ==
- Balatonfenyves narrow-gauge railway - trainline between Balatonfenyves and Somogyszentpál
- Church ruins of Varjaskér - built in Romantic style in the 13th century in an old cemetery
- Castle ruins of Varjaskér - built in the middle of the Fehérvízi Marsh of Nagyberek in the 16th century and was owned by the Török family (today it is on an island and can be reached by boat)
- Roman Catholic Church - built between 1774 and 1778 and was dedicated to Saint Anthony of Padua. Its main altar was made by István Dorffmeister in 1776 and it depicts Saint Anthony of Padua. Two side altars are for Holy Mary and Saint Wendelin. There is also a wooden sculpture of Holy Mary on the wall of the church from the 18th century.

== Notable residents ==
- Ferenc Kovács (born 1921), Hungarian veterinarian, animal physiologist, bio meteorologist, rector of the Állatorvostudományi Egyetem (English: Veterianrian University), member of the Hungarian Academy of Sciences
- László Polgár (1947 – 2010), Hungarian opera singer
- Jenő Szabady (1891 – 1972), Hungarian mechanical engineer
- Márton Hosszú (1783 - 1855), Hungarian abbot of Balatonfüred, priest
- Dénes Kovács (1920 - 1977), Hungarian painter, teacher, museologist, folklore expert, founder of the Museum of Miercurea Ciuc
