= Balsai =

Balsai is a Hungarian surname. Notable people with the surname include:

- István Balsai (1947–2020), Hungarian politician and jurist
- Mónika Balsai (born 1977), Hungarian actress
