= MÁV Class V43 =

Hungarian electric locomotive

Class V43
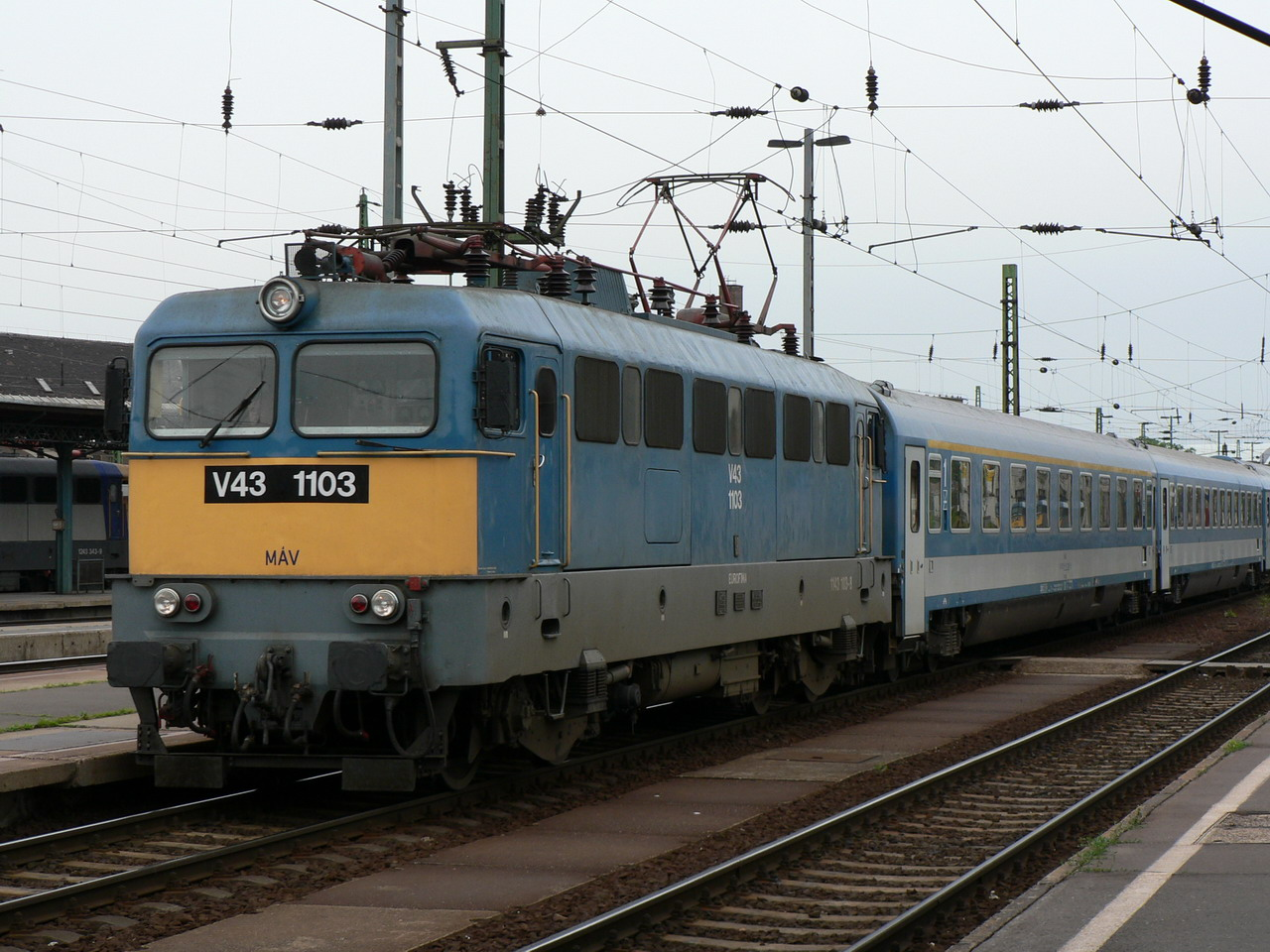
- MÁV Class V43 with Intercity train in Hungary
Type and origin
- Power type: Electric locomotive
- Builder: Ganz
- Build date: 1963–1982
- Total produced: 379
Specifications
- Configuration
  - UIC: B'B'
- Gauge: 1,435 mm (4 ft 8 1/2 in)
- Wheel diameter: 1,180 mm
- Length: 15700 mm
- Loco weight: 80 t
- Traction motors: 2
- Safety systems: EÉVB (hun) EVM-120, MIREL
Performance figures
- Maximum speed: 130 km/h, later 120km/h
- Power output: 2220 kW
- Tractive effort
  - Starting: 270 kN (61,000 lb_{f})
  - Continuous: 150 kN (34,000 lb_{f})

The MÁV Class V43 is a Hungarian electric locomotive with a box-like appearance. It was meant to replace the MÁV Class V40 and MÁV Class V60, as well as the widespread Class 424 steam locomotives. A total of 379 locomotives were built between 1963 and 1982.

The first seven prototype members of the class were ordered in 1960 by the Hungarian administration. to the "Groupement 50 Hz" (50 Hz/50 Cycles Group). After those 7 first units built in Essen, the subsequent 372 ones were built under licence in Hungary by Ganz-MÁVAG (mechanical parts) and Ganz Villamossági Mũvek (electrical parts) in Budapest.

The class design is based on the successful French Railways (SNCF) B’B’ 1.5 kV DC BB 9400 class then in the process of delivery, with which it shared the general structure, particularly the main frames and the single-engine bogies deriving from the famous “Jacquemin drive” ones.

Apart from the different traction power, small technical differences include the overall weight (and the resulting axle load): 60 tonnes for BB 9400 (15 tonnes per axle), versus 78 tonnes for the first batch of V43 in order to avoid exceeding the contractual 80 tonnes limit while being provided with a reserve of 2 tonnes to take into account the potential variability in thickness and weight of the steel sheets used in their construction. Additionally, however, the initial windings of the traction motors proving insufficient to achieve the specified power output, they had to be rewound before the series could be commissioned, and the eventual overall weight was established at 80 tonnes. Initially, the first batches could operate on 16 kV 50 Hz AC supply as well.

With an overall length of 15,700 mm vs 14,400 mm for BB 9400, a 1,180 mm wheel diameter vs 1,020 mm for BB 9400, a similar speed of 120 km/h or 130 km/h depending on their respective periods of use, V43 and BB 9400 shared the same power rating of 2,200 kW. Presumably due to the chosen secondary suspension, different from that of the BB 9400, Hungarian drivers complained of discomfort and many preferred to keep standing while driving. An improvement was sought with the V43 2000 series by inserting rubber mounting pads between the bogies and the frame, together with a dampener to reduce longitudinal jerking movements. Meanwhile, a part of the fleet had received minimal upgrades to comply with EUROFIMA requirements and about half of all V43s are now equipped by modern "semi-pantograph" type catenary current collectors.

Successive sets of modifications led to the subdivision of the class into four subclasses: V43 0000, V43 1000, V43 2000 and V43 3000. Starting in 2011, MÁV-Trakció changed its class numbers to comply with the new UIC numbering pattern. As a consequence, the classes V43 0000, V43 1000, V43 2000, and V43 3000 became the classes 430, 431, 432 and 433.

The classic V43 1000 series is generally nicknamed Szili or Szlikon as a reference to its silicon rectifiers; V43 2000 series is Papagáj (Parrot - because of the painting) otherwise Fecske Szili; V43 3000 series is Cirmos (Tabby - also because of the painting).

The V43 is still the main workhorse for electric traction in Hungary. Its early generation semiconductor technology is now considered obsolete, but the type has good efficiency for both freight and passenger traction. For this, however, the V43 locomotives constantly need to work near the edge of their power reserve when pulling and their efficiency is coincidentally the highest in that region. Extensive preventive maintenance procedures developed by MÁV depots allowed the V43 to serve up to roughly 60 years reliably, despite being maxed out most of the time.

== GySEV ==
GySEV owns 14 V43 class locomotives. GySEV equipped a few of them with PZB I60R for operation on the Austrian lines of the company. The GySEV locos had several catastrophic crashes. V43 331 crashed at Neufeld, and V43 322 at Komárom. Both locomotives were scrapped. V43 333 crashed with V43 326, and rebuilt using the mainframe of the damaged V43 1003.

== Refit ==
From 1999 the series had two refitment sessions. The first session refits 56 locomotives (V43 2xxx) and equipped them with digital control system to cooperate with the modernised control cars (BDt 4xx series). They also had new suspension fitted. The second 30 locomotive (V43 3xxx) produced between 2007 and 2008. These locomotives equipped with ZWS control system to be remotely controlled from the control cars bought from DB (Bybdtee series).

== Future ==
The V43s are being gradually replaced in MÁV service by modern Bombardier TRAXX and Siemens Vectron locomotives.
