= Balatonfenyves =

- Village
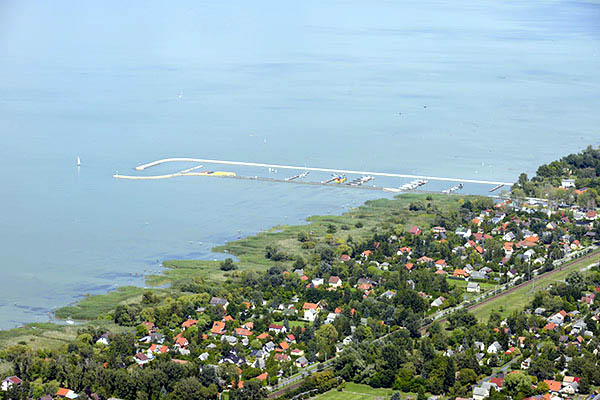
- Aerial view of the village

- Flag Coat of arms

- Location of Balatonfenyves
- Coordinates: 46.71324°N 17.48008°E
- Country: Hungary
- Region: Southern Transdanubia
- County: Somogy
- District: Fonyód
- RC Diocese: Kaposvár

Area
  - Total: 5.19 km^{2} (2.00 sq mi)

Population (2020)
  - Total: 1.730 ▼
  - Density: 0.333/km^{2} (0.863/sq mi)
- Demonym(s): fenyvesi, balatonfenyvesi
- Time zone: UTC+1 (CET)
  - Summer (DST): UTC+2 (CEST)
- Postal code: 8646
- Area code: (+36) 85
- Motorways: M7
- Distance from Budapest: 162 km (101 mi) Northeast
- NUTS 3 code: HU232
- MP: József Attila Móring (KDNP)
- Website: Balatonfenyves Online

Balatonfenyves is a village at Lake Balaton in Somogy county, Hungary. The name comes from the lake and the Hungarian word for pine tree: fenyves. Formerly part of Fonyód, the village was granted independence as a result of a referendum held on 12 May 1991.

The area between the railroad and lake is a holiday destination that attracts mainly families staying in holiday houses. The summer weekends can be busy as people come for the day by train or car.

The pedestrian Vachott Sándor street has the shops and is the main link between the station and the beach. The train station is a stop on the Székesfehérvár-Gyékényes line and has a smaller side station from which a (touristic) Balatonfenyves narrow-gauge railway can be taken land inward connecting the Imremajor and Pálmajor outskirts of the village.

The beach, the longest on the lake (about 1.8 km (1.12 mi)) and freely accessible, is a grass area with many lángos and gyros fast-food stands.

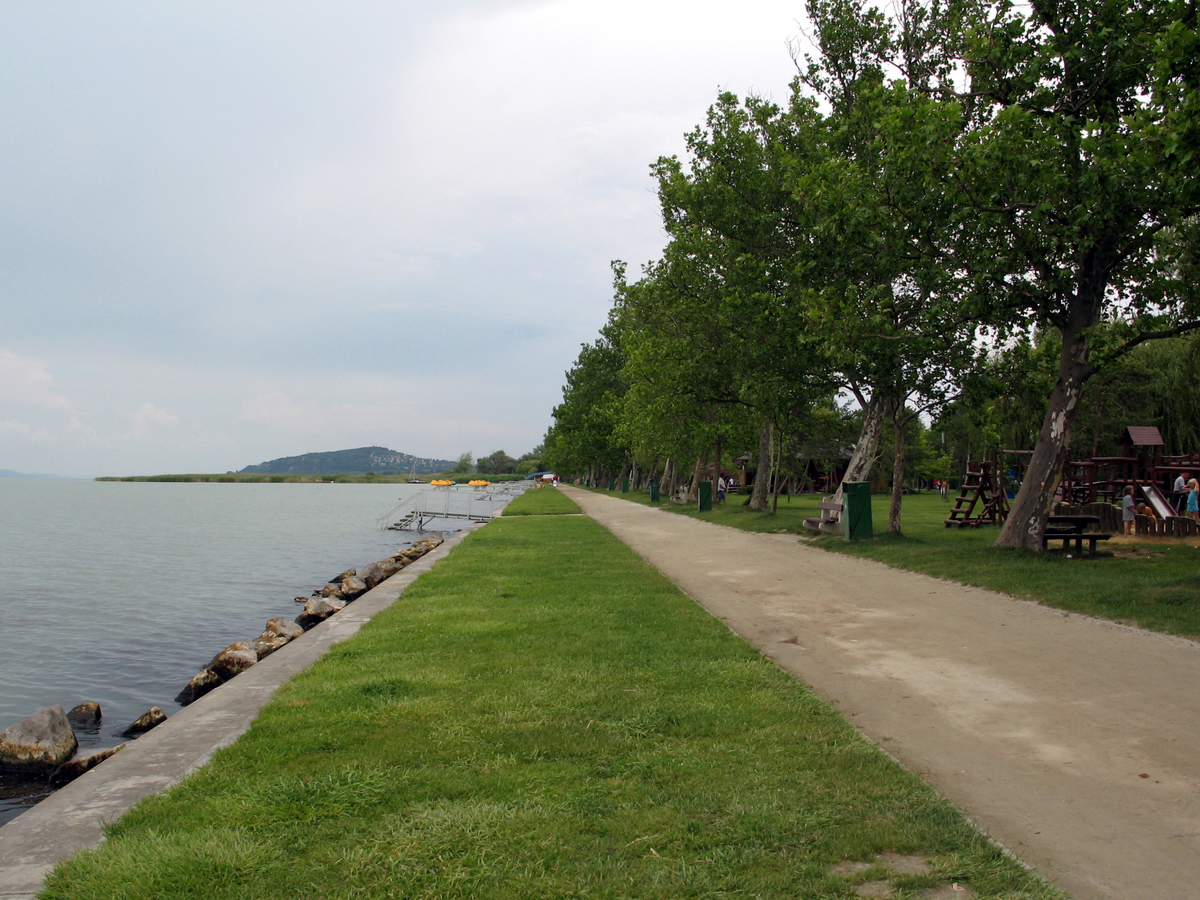
Typical view of the beach

Balatonfenyves is home to the Fenyves Yacht Club in the western part of the village.
