= Budapest railway station =

There are three main railway stations in Budapest:

- Budapest Keleti station, Budapest East railway station
- Budapest Nyugati station, Budapest West railway station
- Budapest Déli station, Budapest South railway station
