= Környe–Oroszlány railway line =

Railway line in Hungary

Környe–Oroszlány
- Route map

Overview
- Line number: 12
- Termini: Környe; Oroszlány
- Stations: 3

Service

Technical
- Line length: 7.1 km (4.4 mi)
- Track gauge: 1,435 mm (4 ft 8 1/2 in) standard gauge
- Electrification: 25 kV 50 Hz AC

The Környe–Oroszlány railway line is a 7.1 kilometres (4.4 mi) railway line in Komárom-Esztergom County, Hungary. The line runs between Környe and Oroszlány, connecting with the Tatabánya–Pápa railway line at Környe. It is owned and operated by Hungarian State Railways (MÁV) and primarily serves passenger traffic between Tatabánya and Oroszlány

== Route ==
The Környe–Oroszlány railway line branches off from the Tatabánya–Pápa railway line west of Környe railway station and runs southward to Oroszlány railway station.

== Operation ==
Hungarian State Railways operates the S12 service on the line as part of Budapest's suburban network. The S12 runs hourly between Oroszlány and Tatabánya, providing connections service to and from Budapest Déli station.
