= Budapest-Kelenföld railway station =

Railway station in Budapest, Hungary

Budapest-Kelenföld
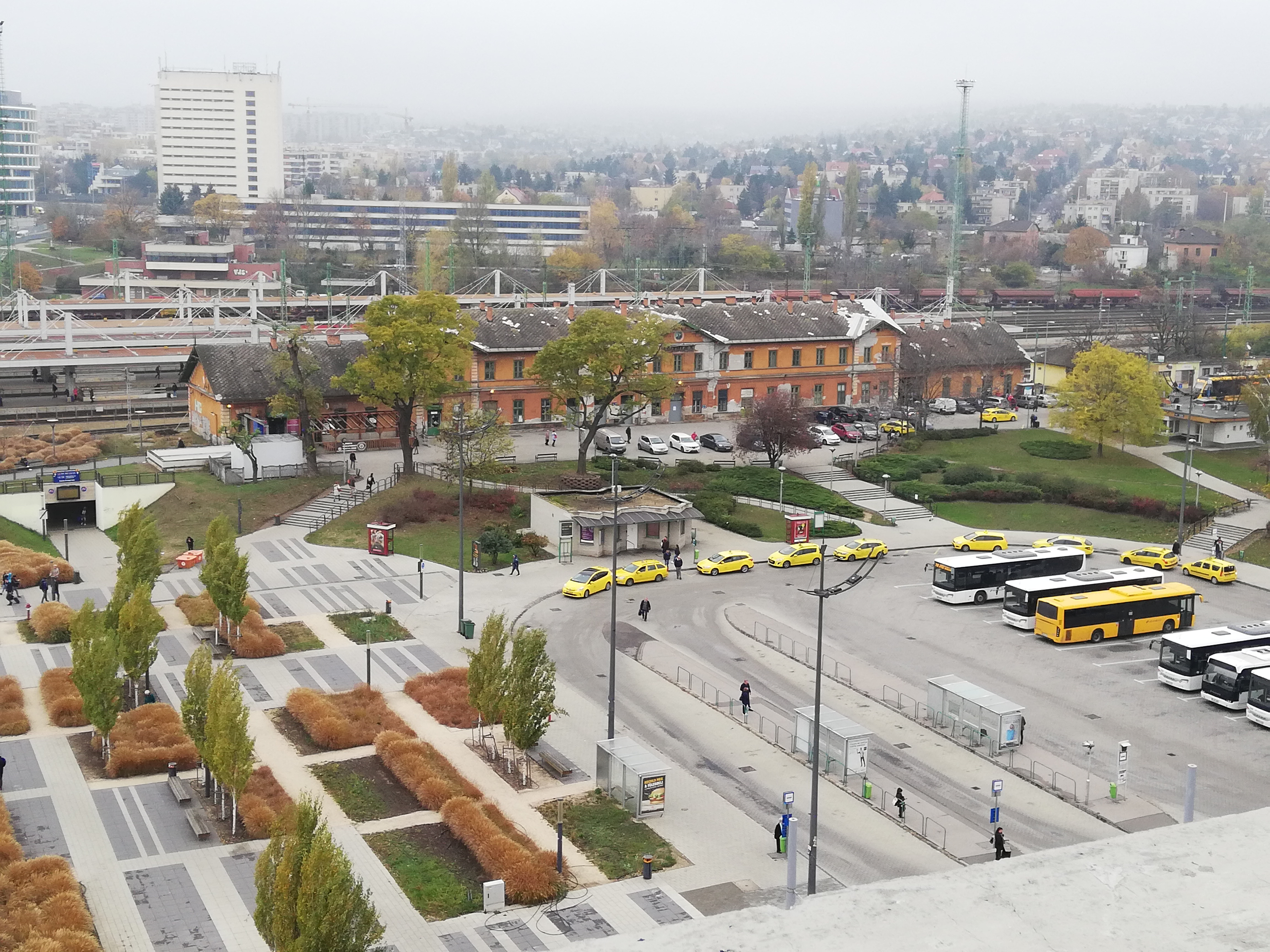
- Etele Square with former station building

General information
- Location: Etele tér 1115 Budapest; Hungary
- Coordinates: 47°27′52″N 19°01′13″E
- Owner: Hungarian State Railways (MÁV)
- Lines: Budapest–Hegyeshalom; Budapest–Székesfehérvár; Budapest–Pusztaszabolcs
- Platforms: 16
- Connections: Metro: Tram: 1, 19, 49

History
- Opened: 1861
Services
Preceding station	MÁV START	Following station
Tatabánya towards München Hbf	Railjet Express	Budapest Keleti Terminus
Tatabánya towards Zürich HB	Railjet Express	Budapest Keleti Terminus
Tatabánya towards Graz Hbf	InterCity	Budapest Keleti Terminus
Simontornya towards Gyékényes	InterCity	Budapest Keleti Terminus
Simontornya towards Kaposvár	InterCity	Budapest Keleti Terminus
Tatabánya towards Ljubljana	InterCity	Budapest Keleti Terminus
Sárbogárd towards Pécs	InterCity	Budapest Keleti Terminus
Tatabánya towards Sopron	InterCity	Budapest Keleti Terminus
Székesfehérvár towards Split	InterCity	Budapest Keleti Terminus
Tatabánya towards Szentgotthárd	InterCity	Budapest Keleti Terminus
Székesfehérvár towards Szombathely	InterCity	Budapest Déli Terminus
Székesfehérvár towards Keszthely	InterCity	Budapest Déli Terminus
Székesfehérvár towards Zalaegerszeg	InterCity	Budapest Déli Terminus
Székesfehérvár towards Tapolca	InterCity	Budapest Déli Terminus
Székesfehérvár towards Nagykanizsa	InterCity	Budapest Déli Terminus
Székesfehérvár towards Ljubljana	InterCity	Budapest Déli Terminus
Tatabánya towards Wien Hbf	EuroCity	Budapest Keleti Terminus
Tatabánya towards Wien Hbf	EuroCity	Budapest Keleti towards Chop
Tatabánya towards Wien Hbf	EuroCity	Budapest Keleti towards Cluj Napoca
Tatabánya towards Salzburg Hbf, Stuttgart Hbf or Zürich HB	EuroNight Kálmán Imre	Budapest Keleti Terminus
Székesfehérvár towards Zagreb	Expresszvonat	Budapest Déli Terminus
Tatabánya towards Wien Hbf	Dacia–Corvin Express	Ferencváros towards Bucharest North
Érd alsó towards Balatonszentgyörgy	InterRegio	Budapest Déli Terminus
Székesfehérvár towards Balatonfüred	InterRegio	Budapest Déli Terminus
Biatorbágy towards Győr	S10	Budapest Déli Terminus
Budaörs towards Oroszlány	S12	Budapest Déli Terminus
Budafok towards Pusztaszabolcs	S40	Budapest Déli Terminus
Budafok towards Dunaújváros	S42	Budapest Déli Terminus
Érd alsó towards Székesfehérvár	Z30	Budapest Déli Terminus
Biatorbágy towards Tatabánya	G10	Ferencváros towards Budapest Keleti
Budafok towards Székesfehérvár	G43	Ferencváros towards Kőbánya-Kispest
Albertfalva towards Tárnok	S36	Ferencváros towards Kőbánya-Kispest
Location
- Location within Budapest

Budapest-Kelenföld railway station (Hungarian: Kelenföldi vasútállomás or incorrectly Kelenföldi pályaudvar, and between 2010 and 2019 officially Kelenföld) is among Budapest's four busiest railway stations (the others are Keleti pu, Déli pu and Nyugati pu). Opened in 1861, it is situated south-west of the city centre, in Újbuda or District XI in the suburb Kelenföld.

Today, Budapest-Kelenföld is an extremely busy station, with almost all passenger and freight services operated by Hungarian Railways towards Transdanubia passing through.

The station is served by Kelenföld vasútállomás metro station and is the terminus of the Line 4 of the Budapest Metro which opened on 28 March 2014.

Next to the station there is a suburban Volánbusz bus terminal.

As of 2024, the old station building is undergoing renovations and is set to become a part of the Hungarian Technical and Transportation Museum.

== Train services ==
The station is served by the following services:

- Railjet services
  - Budapest - Tatabánya- Győr - Vienna - St Pölten - Linz - Salzburg Hbf
  - Budapest - Tatabánya - Győr - Vienna - St Pölten - Linz - Salzburg - München Hbf
  - Budapest - Tatabánya - Győr - Vienna - St Pölten - Linz - Salzburg - Innsbruck - Zürich Hb
- EuroCity services – EC
  - (Lehár) Budapest - Tatabánya - Győr - Wien Westbf
  - (Hortobágy) Nyíregyháza - Debrecen - Szolnok - Budapest - Tatabánya - Győr - Wien Westbf

Since the completion of "Wien Hauptbahnhof" (Wien Hbf) all trains to and from Budapest go via Wien Hbf.

  - (Citadella) Budapest - Székesfehérvár - Veszprém - Zalaegerszeg - Celje - Ljubljana
- EuroNight services – EN
  - (Kálmán Imre) Budapest - Tatabánya - Győr - Vienna - St Pölten - Linz - Salzburg - München Hbf
- Int. InterCity services – IC
  - (Rába) Budapest - Tatabánya - Győr - Szombathely - Graz Hbf
  - (Agram, Rippl-Rónai) Budapest - Dombóvár - Kaposvár - Koprivnica - Zagreb Glavni Kol.
- Int. Express services
  - (Dacia) Wien Westbf - Győr - Tatabánya - Budapest - Szolnok - Békéscsaba - Arad - Deva - Brasov - București Nord

Inland

- Intercity services – IC
  - (Borostyánkő-Tűztorony, Claudius-Volt Fesztivál, Savaris-Scarbantia, Alpokalja-Kékfrankos, Répce-Sopron Bank)
    Budapest-Keleti pu. - Budapest-Kelenföld - Tatabánya - Győr - Csorna / Répcelak - Szombathely / Sopron
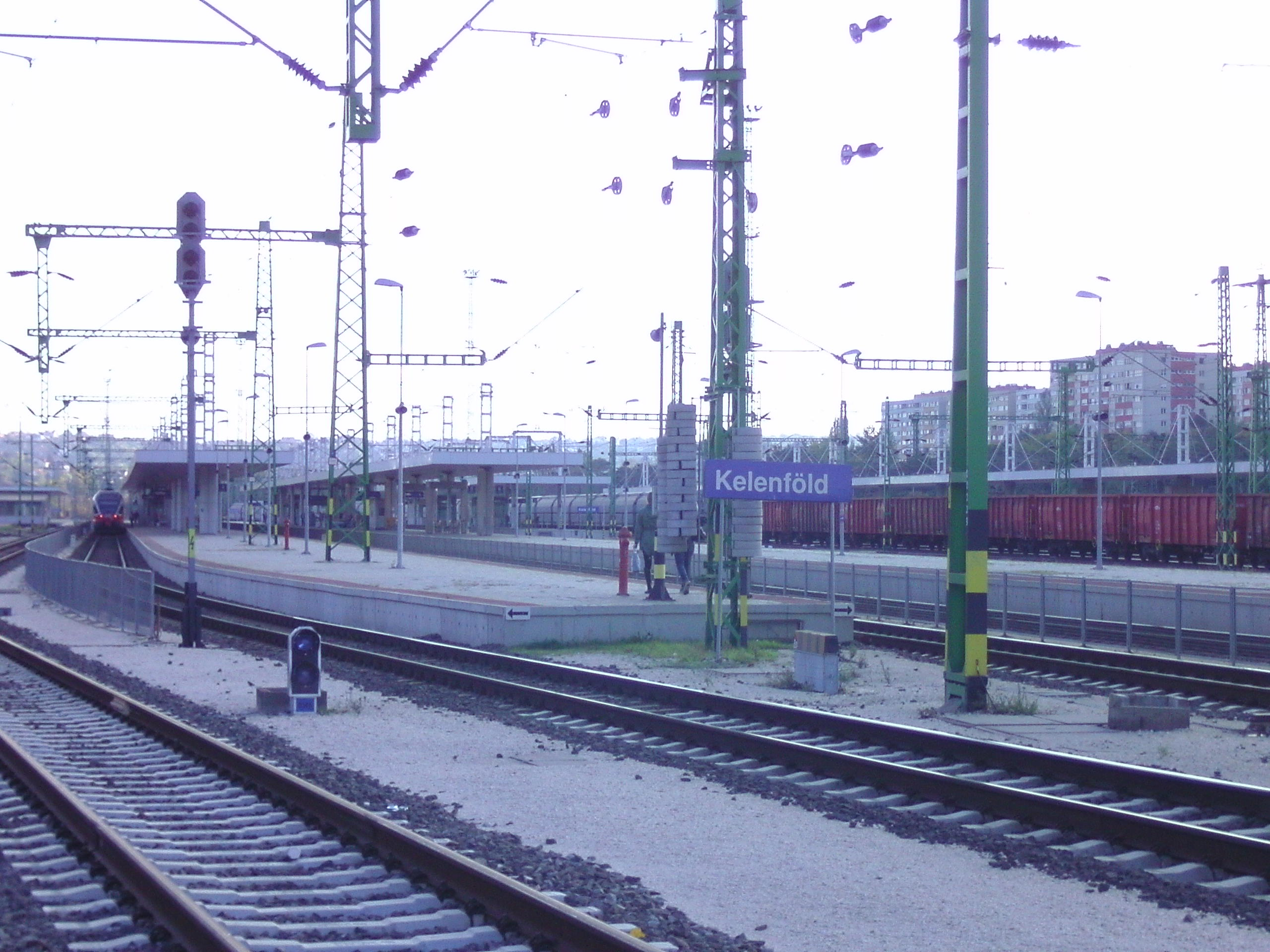
  - Budapest-Kelenföld Station after modernisation
    (Baranya, Dráva, Mecsek, PTE, Sopianae, Tenkes, Tettye, Tubes, Zengő)
    Budapest-Keleti pu. - Budapest-Kelenföld - Sárbogárd - Pincehely - Dombóvár - Sásd - Szentlőric - Pécs

== Public Transport ==
Budapest-Kelenföld railway station is located in the 11th district of Budapest, Hungary.

- Metro:
- Tram: 1, 19, 49
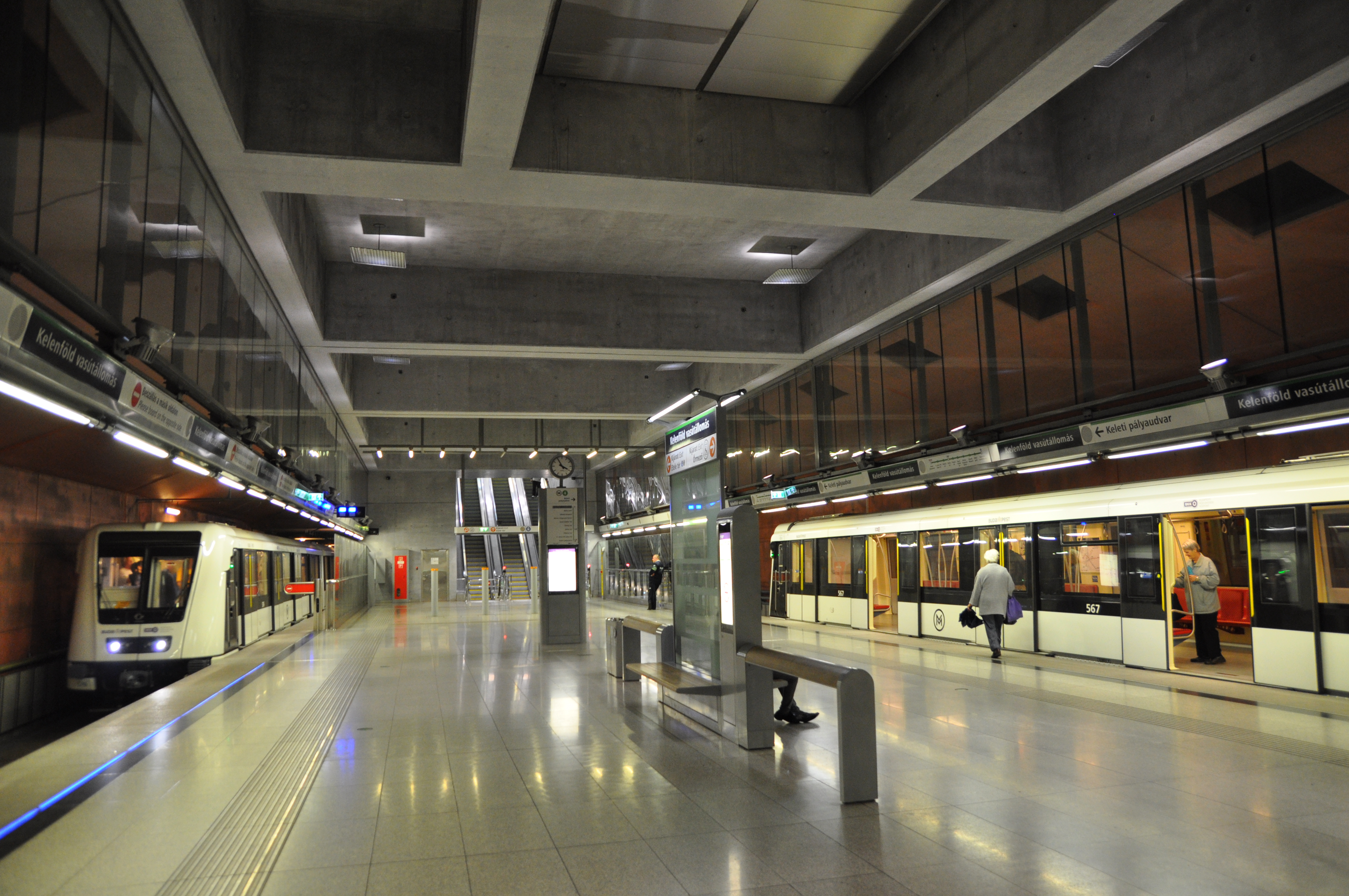
- Metro Station (M4, Green Line)
  Bus: 8E, 40, 40B, 40E, 53, 58, 87, 88, 88A, 88B, 101B, 101E, 103, 108E, 141, 150, 153, 154, 172, 173, 187, 188, 188E, 250, 250B, 251, 251A, 272
- Regional bus: 689, 691, 710, 712, 715, 720, 722, 724, 725, 727, 731, 732, 734, 735, 736, 760, 762, 763, 767, 770, 774, 775, 777, 778, 798, 799
- Nocturnal lines: 901, 907, 918

== See also ==
- Kelenföld vasútállomás (Budapest Metro)
