= Tatabánya–Pápa railway line =

Railway line in Hungary

Tatabánya–Pápa
- Route map

Overview
- Owner: Hungarian State Railways
- Line number: 13

Service

Technical
- Track gauge: 1,435 mm (4 ft 8 1/2 in) standard gauge
- Electrification: 25 kV 50 Hz AC (Tatabánya–Környe)
- Operating speed: 80 km/h (50 mph)

The Tatabánya–Pápa railway line is a railway line in Hungary. It runs 93.2 kilometres (57.9 mi) from Tatabánya to Pápa. Most of the line no longer hosts passenger service, and it is partially abandoned in the vicinity of Pápa. Hungarian State Railways owns and operates the line.

== Route ==
The line runs roughly east–west between Tatabánya and Pápa. In Tatabánya, the line diverges from the Budapest–Hegyeshalom railway line west of the Tatabánya railway station. In Környe, 7.6 kilometres (4.7 mi) from Tatabánya, the Környe–Oroszlány railway line veers off to the south to serve Oroszlány. Electrification ends at this point, and there is no passenger service beyond Környe. The line connects with the Székesfehérvár–Komárom railway line in Kisbér, the Győr–Veszprém railway line in Veszprémvarsány, and the Győr–Celldömölk railway line and Pápa–Csorna railway lines in Pápa.

== Operation ==
Hungarian State Railways operates the S12 service as part of Budapest's suburban network. The S12 runs hourly between Oroszlány and Tatabánya, with connecting service to and from Budapest Déli station.
