= Tatabánya railway station =

Railway station in Tatabánya, Hungary

Tatabánya
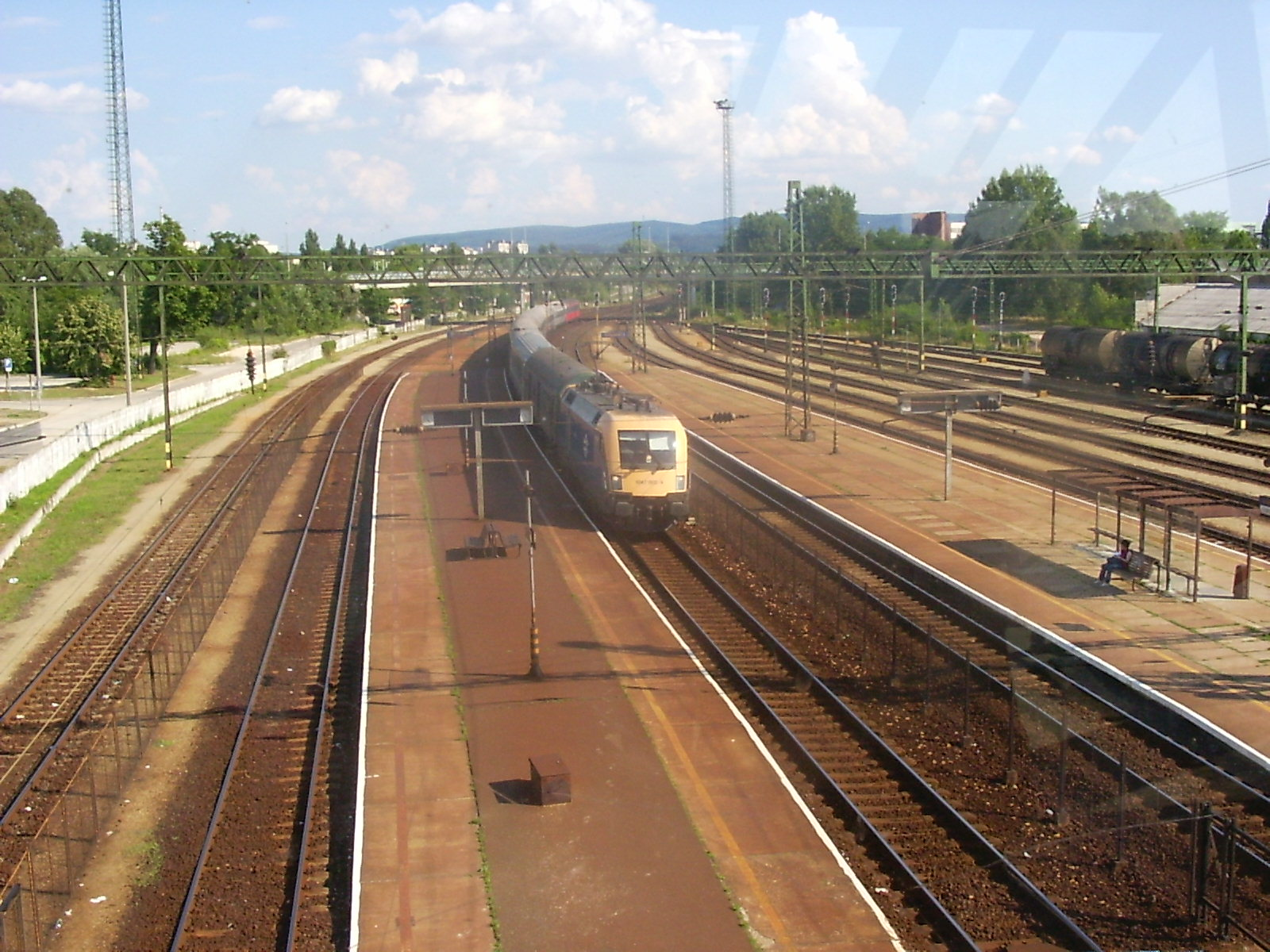
- Tatabánya railway station

General information
- Location: Tatabánya; Hungary
- Coordinates: 47°35′08″N 18°23′36″E
- Owner: Hungarian State Railways (MÁV)
- Lines: Line 1 Budapest–Hegyeshalom railway Line 12 Tatabánya–Oroszlány railway Line 13 Tatabánya–Pápa railway
- Platforms: 4

History
- Opened: 15 July 1884

Services
Preceding station	ÖBB	Following station
Győr towards München Hbf	Railjet Express	Budapest-Kelenföld towards Budapest Keleti
Győr towards Zürich HB	Railjet Express	Budapest-Kelenföld towards Budapest Keleti
Preceding station	MÁV START	Following station
Győr towards Wien Hbf	EuroCity	Budapest-Kelenföld towards Budapest Keleti
Győr towards Wien Hbf	EuroCity	Budapest-Kelenföld towards Cluj Napoca
Tata towards Ljubljana	InterCity	Budapest-Kelenföld towards Budapest Keleti
Tata towards Graz Hbf	InterCity	Budapest-Kelenföld towards Budapest Keleti
Tata towards Szentgotthárd	InterCity	Budapest-Kelenföld towards Budapest Keleti
Tata towards Sopron	InterCity	Budapest-Kelenföld towards Budapest Keleti
Győr towards Salzburg Hbf, Stuttgart Hbf or Zürich HB	EuroNight Kálmán Imre	Budapest-Kelenföld towards Budapest Keleti
Győr towards Wien Hbf	Dacia–Corvin Express	Budapest-Kelenföld towards Bucharest North
Vértesszőlős towards Győr	S10	Alsógalla towards Budapest Déli
Bánhida towards Oroszlány	S12	Alsógalla towards Budapest Déli
Terminus	G10	Alsógalla towards Budapest Keleti
Location
- Location within Hungary

Tatabánya railway station (Hungarian: Tatabánya vasútállomás) is a railway station in Tatabánya, Komárom-Esztergom County, Hungary. The station opened on 15 July 1884. The station is located on the main line between Vienna and Budapest (Line 1 Budapest–Hegyeshalom railway), Line 12 Tatabánya–Oroszlány railway and Line 13 Tatabánya–Pápa railway. The train services are operated by MÁV START.

== Train services ==
The station is served by the following services:

- RailJet services Zürich - Innsbruck - Salzburg - Linz - St Pölten - Vienna - Győr - Budapest
- RailJet services Munich - Salzburg - Linz - St Pölten - Vienna - Győr - Budapest
- RailJet services Frankfurt - Stuttgart - Munich - Salzburg - Linz - St Pölten - Vienna - Győr - Budapest
- EuroCity services Vienna - Győr - Budapest - Kiskunmajsa - Novi Sad - Belgrade
- EuroCity services Vienna - Győr - Budapest - Debrecen - Nyíregyháza
- EuroNight services Munich - Salzburg - Linz - St Pölten - Vienna - Győr - Budapest
- EuroNight services Vienna - Győr - Budapest - Szolnok - Arad - Bucharest
- Intercity services Sopron / Szombathely - Répcelak / Csorna - Győr - Budapest
