= EuroNight =

Night train category in Europe

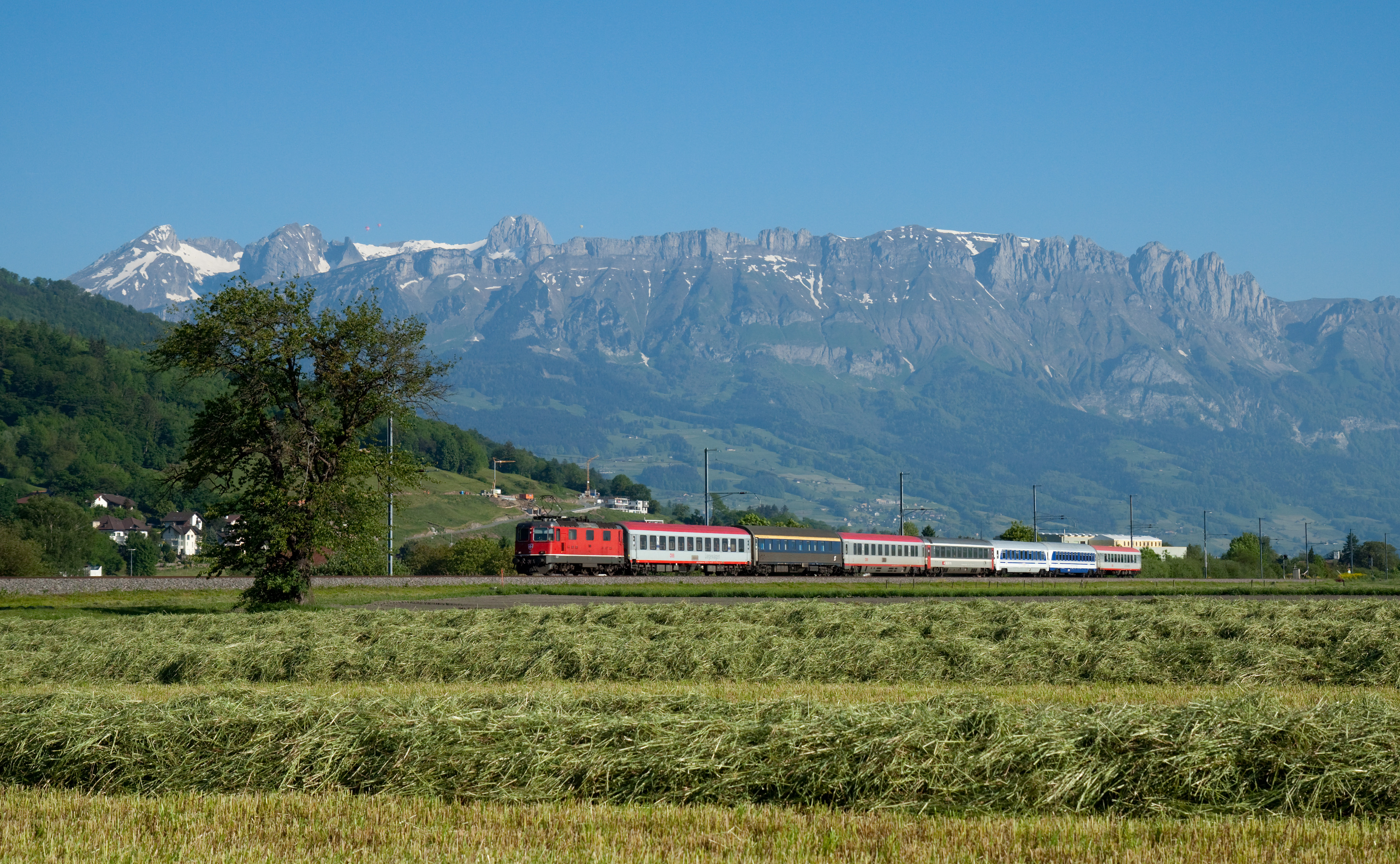
EuroNight

EuroNight, abbreviated EN, is a European train category that denotes many mainline national and international night train services within the Western and Central European inter-city rail network.

== Overview ==
The classification and name were brought into use in May 1993. As the name suggests, the EuroNight trains tend to run during the nighttime and are generally equipped with sleeping cars. Nearly all EuroNight trains require reservations and additional fare supplements in addition to the regular cost of a ticket from the destination to the arrival point. These supplements vary in price depending on whether the passenger choose a regular seat, a couchette "lying bed", which offers a padded, felt bed with a blanket and small pillow, or a sleeping bed, which allows a mattress bed with full bedding (sheets, comforters, pillows).

Nearly all EuroNight services are international and jointly operated by national rail companies sharing cars on a route. EN trains are the standard night-train service for Western and most Central European nations. They are distinct from the older D-Nacht services, many of which still operate in Central and Eastern Europe. EN trains have criteria that rail companies must match in order to receive EN designation; the numbering format is EN 999; many routes also have accompanying names derived in the 19th and 20th centuries.

== Operating carriers ==
The following carriers currently have designated cars and train conductors who work the EN lines. Many railway companies share cars on the same train line between routes; for example, EN 235 between Vienna and Rome share cars of both the ÖBB and Trenitalia.

- (Austria) Austrian Federal Railways
- (Croatia) Croatian Railways
- (Czech Republic) České dráhy
- (Hungary) Hungarian State Railways
- (Poland) Polish State Railways
- (Slovakia) Železničná spoločnosť Slovensko

Deutsche Bahn terminated all of its own night train services by December 2016.. Before termination, Deutsche Bahn operated the City Night Line hotel-quality night services between Germany, Italy, the Czech Republic, Switzerland, and the Netherlands. Two of those, the Kopernikus and the Canopus, were designated EuroNight trains as EN 458/459.

As of 2025, Swiss Federal Railways (SBB) were planning to reintroduce an overnight Euronight service from 2026 between Basel‒Copenhagen‒Malmö following the CityNightLine Aurora route withdrawn in 2014.

== List of EuroNight trains ==
Number	Name	Route	Operator	Travel Time
EN 345; EN 346	SJ EuroNight	Stockholm – Norrköping – Linköping – Nässjö – Alvesta – Hässleholm – Lund – Malmö – Copenhagen Airport – Padborg – Hamburg Hbf – Berlin Hbf	Until August 2026: RDC Deutschland, on behalf of SJ; From September 2026: RDC Deutschland	13 h
EN 40456; EN 407	Chopin	Graz – Wiener Neustadt – Wien Hbf. – Ostrava hl.n. – Katowice – Warsaw Gdańska - Warsaw East	PKP Intercity, ČD, ÖBB	14 h
EN 442; EN 443	Slovakia	Prague hl.n. – Kolín – Pardubice hl.n. – Česká Třebová – Olomouc hl.n. – Ostrava-Svinov – Ostrava hl.n. – Bohumín – Čadca – Žilina – Vrútky – Kraľovany – Ružomberok – Liptovský Mikuláš – Štrba – Poprad-Tatry – Spišská Nová Ves – Margecany – Kysak – Košice – Michaľany – Trebišov – Bánovce nad Ondavou – Michalovce – Strážske – Brekov – Humenné	ČD, ŽSSK	12 h 9 h
EN 40458; EN 40459	Canopus	Prague hl.n. – Ústí nad Labem – Dresden Hbf. – Leipzig Hbf – Erfurt – Frankfurt (Main) South – Mannheim Hbf – Karlsruhe Hbf – Freiburg(Breisgau) – Basel – Zürich HB	ČD	13 h
EN 50466; EN 50467		Prague hl.n. – České Budějovice – Linz – Salzburg Hbf – Innsbruck – Feldkirch – Buchs – Sargans – Zürich HB	ČD	14 h
EN 50462; EN 50237		Budapest Keleti – Kelenföld – Tatabánya – Győr – Hegyeshalom – Wien Hbf – Wien Meidling – St. Pölten – Linz – Salzburg Hbf – München Ost – Augsburg – Stuttgart	MÁV	13 h
EN 40414; EN 40465	Zürichsee	Zagreb – Dobova – Ljubljana – Jesenice – Villach – Innsbruck – Feldkirch – Zürich	HŽ	14 h 10 h
EN 40462; EN 40467		Budapest Keleti – Kelenföld – Tatabánya – Győr – Hegyeshalom – Wien Hbf – Wien Meidling – St. Pölten – Linz – Salzburg Hbf – Innsbruck – Feldkirch – Buchs – Sargans – Zürich HB	MÁV	12 h
EN 472; EN 473	Ister	Budapest Keleti – Szolnok – Békéscsaba – Lőkösháza – Curtici – Arad – Făgăraș – Brașov – Ploiești Vest – București Gara de Nord	MÁV, CFR	14 (30) h
EN 40457; EN 40476	Metropol	Berlin – Wrocław – Opole – Bratislava hl.st. – Budapest	MÁV	14 h
EN 414; EN 40237		Stuttgart – Ulm – Augsburg – München Ost – Salzburg – Schwarzach-St. Veit – Villach – Jesenice – Lesce Bled – Kranj – Ljubljana – Zidani Most – Sevnica – Dobova – Savski Marof – Zagreb (previously extended to Rijeka)	HŽ	13 h
EN 1272; EN 1273		Bratislava hl.st. – Wien Hbf – Zagreb – Split	ŽSSK, HŽ	18 h
EN 295; EN 294		Munich Central – Munich East – Salzburg – Villach – Bologna Centrale – Florence SMN – Rome Termini (with through carriages from Villach to Bologna, Rimini, and Ancona.)	ÖBB	13 h (13) h
EN 40295; EN 40235		Munich Central – Munich East – Salzburg – Villach Hbf – Padua – Vicenza – Verona Porta Nuova – Brescia – Milan Rogoredo – Genoa Piazza Principe – La Spezia	ÖBB, Trenitalia	15 h
EN 237; EN 236		Stuttgart – Augsburg – Munich East – Salzburg – Villach Hbf. – Tarvisio Boscoverde – Udine – Pordenone – Conegliano – Treviso Centrale – Venezia Mestre – Venezia Santa Lucia	ÖBB	12 h
EN 424; EN 425		Berlin – Halle (Saale) – Erfurt – Frankfurt (Main) – Mainz – Koblenz – Bonn-Beuel – Aachen – Liege-Guillemins – Brussels North – Brussels South	ÖBB	14 h
EN 476; EN 477 (Note: Operates as IC 576/577 between Prague and Břeclav.)	Metropol	Prague hl.n. – Praha-Libeň – Kolín – Pardubice hl.n. – Choceň – Ústí nad Orlicí – Česká Třebová – Brno hl.n. – Břeclav – Kúty – Bratislava hl.st. – Nové Zámky – Štúrovo – Vác – Budapest Nyugati	ČD, MÁV	10 h

== See also ==
- Train categories in Europe
- EuroCity
- Rail transport in Europe
