= Lehár (train) =

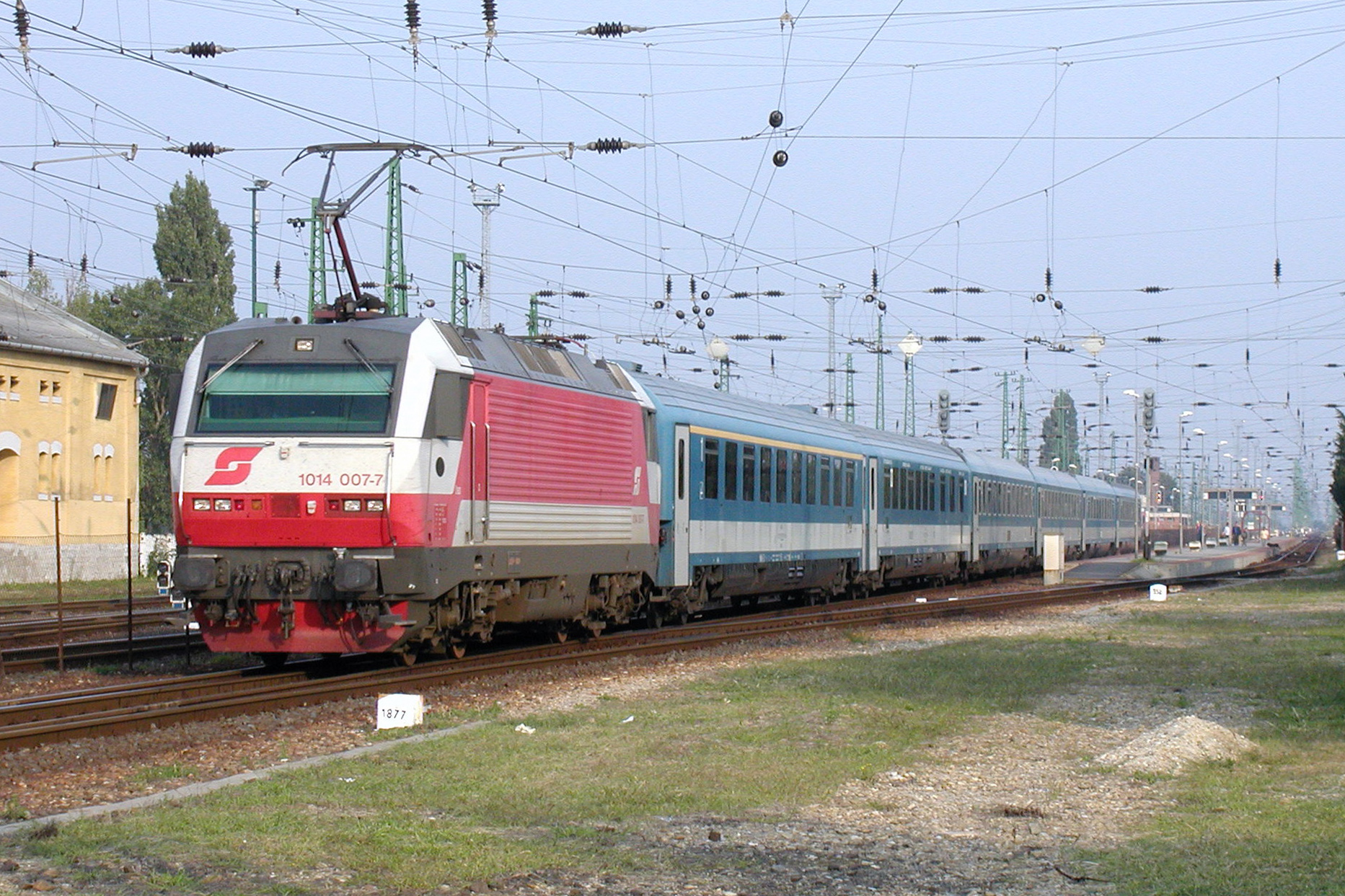
- ÖBB 1014 007 with EC41 LEHÁR in Hegyeshalom, Hungary in 2002.

Overview
- Service type: EuroCity (EC) (1988–2008, 2014–present)
- Status: Replaced by Railjet，but reinstated in 2014
- Locale: Hungary; Austria
- First service: 1979
- Last service: December 2008
- Successor: RJ 42/41
- Former operators: MÁV; ÖBB

Route
- Termini: Budapest Déli / (1979–1996); Budapest Keleti (1996–2008); Wien Südbahnhof
- Service frequency: Daily
- Train number: EC 40/41 (1988–2008)

Technical
- Track gauge: 1,435 mm (4 ft 8 1/2 in)
- Electrification: 25 kV AC, 50 Hz (Hungary); 15 kV AC, 50 Hz (Austria)

The Lehár is an express train between Budapest, Hungary, and Vienna, Austria. Introduced in 1979, it was the first eastern European train to become a EuroCity service, in 1988.

The train is operated by the Hungarian State Railways (MÁV) and the Austrian Federal Railways (ÖBB), and is named after Franz Lehár (1870–1948), an Austro-Hungarian composer. It was replaced by a Railjet service in 2008, but reinstated in 2014.

== History ==
The Lehár first ran in 1979. The following year, a trip on the train was featured in "Changing Trains", the final episode in Series 1 of Great Railway Journeys of the World, a BBC TV travel documentary. The "Changing Trains" trip, which was the last stage of a longer journey from Paris to Budapest, was also included in the book published to complement the series.

In the book, Eric Robson, the presenter and author of "Changing Trains", described the Lehár as "slow at the best of times", and gave the following account of its border crossing at Hegyeshalom:

Little groups of armed soldiers stand about. I'm reminded that people were shot on this frontier not many weeks before. The train is taken over by an army of workmen, tapping wheels, climbing over bogies and, in the carriages, peering into ceiling cavities and shining torches under the seats. My passport is checked four times and finally stamped with a multi-coloured seal of approval. A girl scuttling about the compartments with an official briefcase demands to know if I have Hungarian money, and scuttles away again before I have a chance to answer.

— Eric Robson, "Changing Trains", in Great Railway Journeys of the World (London: British Broadcasting Corporation, 1981)

In May 1988, the Lehár was added to the EuroCity network. The time required for the border crossing was shortened to ten minutes, due to the introduction of dual-voltage locomotives that did not need to be changed at the border, and onboard passport and customs inspections. The overall travel time from Vienna to Budapest was reduced to just three hours.

In 1996, the Lehár's Budapest terminal was moved from Budapest Déli to Budapest Keleti.

By 2004, an upgrade of the Hegyeshalom to Budapest line had reduced the train's whole trip to less than three hours each way, making it possible for travellers to make a one-day excursion from Vienna to Budapest and back. The border crossing time had been shortened to three minutes, with passport, visa and customs inspections performed on the train.

In December 2008, the Lehár was replaced by a Railjet service.

In the period between 2008 and 2010, railjet operated during the train schedule, Lehár received a new schedule and train number (EC 968/969 instead of EC 40/41). It was on hiatus from 2010 to 2014, and was restarted with the 2014-2015 schedule change. It was temporarily suspended from March 25 to June 30, 2020 due to the coronavirus epidemic . International trains restarted on July 1, 2020. From October 30, 2020, instead of EuroCity, an express train ran between Budapest and Hegyeshalom with the same number of trains until May 31, 2021.

== Formation (consist) ==
As of 1989, the Lehár was a locomotive-hauled train with air-conditioned ÖBB first- and second-class cars, an MÁV first-class salon car and an MÁV dining car.

By 2004, the formation had changed to a single MÁV first-class salon car, an MÁV restaurant car, and six ÖBB second-class compartment cars.

== See also ==
- History of rail transport in Austria
- History of rail transport in Hungary
- List of EuroCity services
- List of named passenger trains of Europe
