= Gyula Rochlitz =

Hungarian architect

- Born: Julius Rochlitz; 5 December 1825; Nagyrőce, Austria-Hungary
- Died: 18 January 1886; Budapest, Austria-Hungary
- Education: TU Wien, Vienna; Technical University of Budapest, Budapest
- Occupation: Architect
- Buildings: Budapest Keleti railway station

Gyula Rochlitz (born as Julius Rochlitz, 1825–1886) was a Hungarian architect.

Rochlitz completed his studies at Vienna University of Technology before commencing work at the Hungarian Railways where he became chief architect of the Budapest Railway Directorate in the late 19th century. It was in this role that he planned and designed (along with János Feketeházy) the arrivals hall of Budapest's 1884 Keleti pályaudvar (Eastern Railway Station) and the 477m-long Southern Railway Bridge (Összekötő vasúti híd) over the river Danube. He died in Budapest in 1886.

== Gallery ==
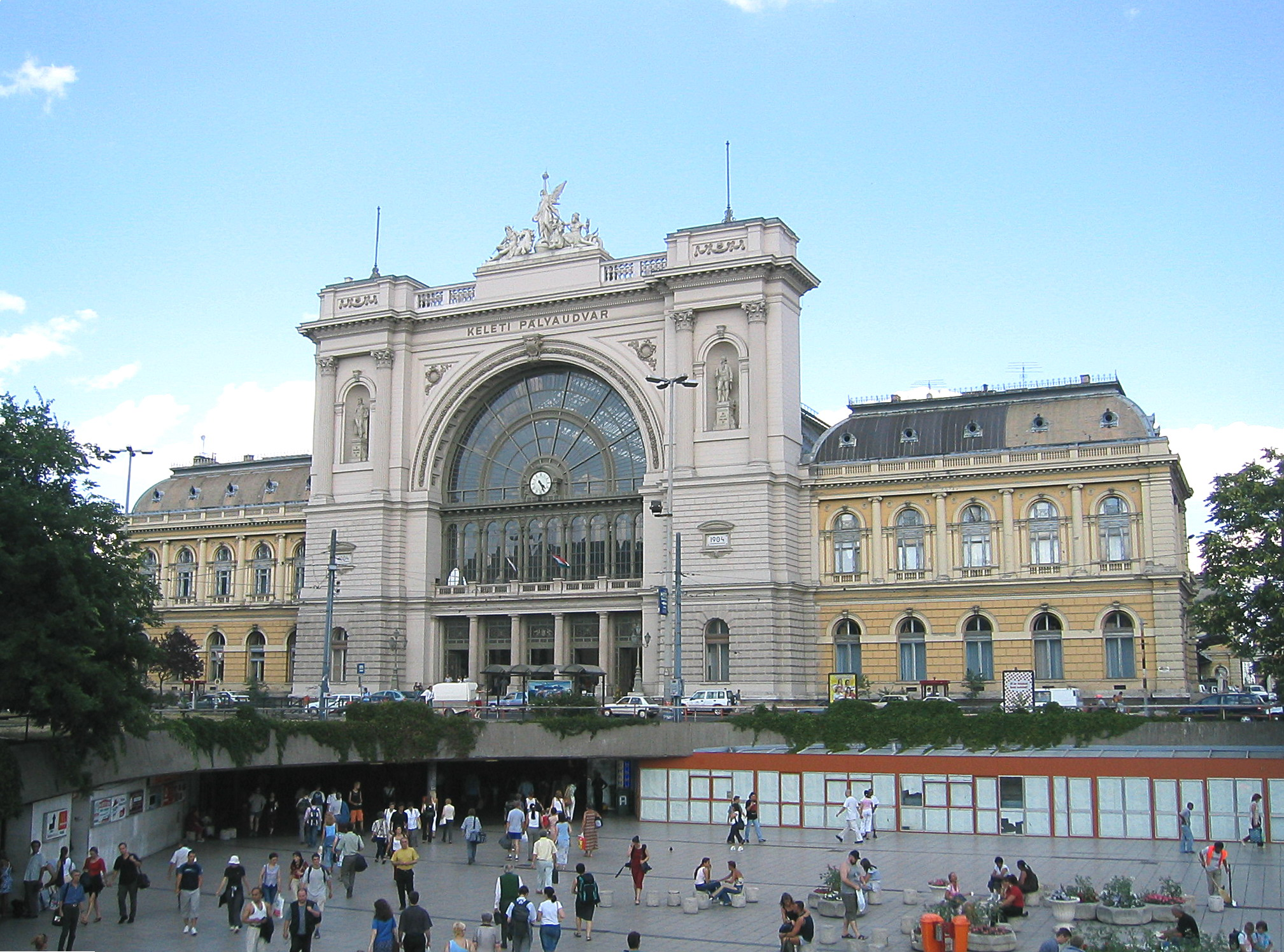
Eastern Railway Station in Budapest

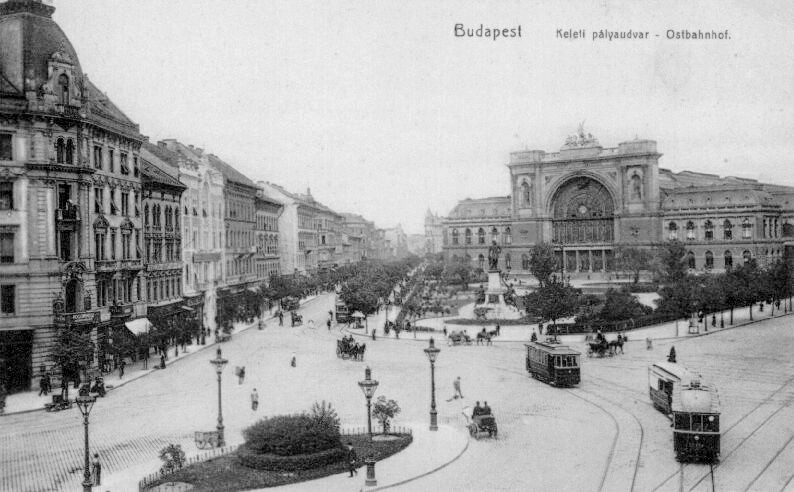
The station around 1900

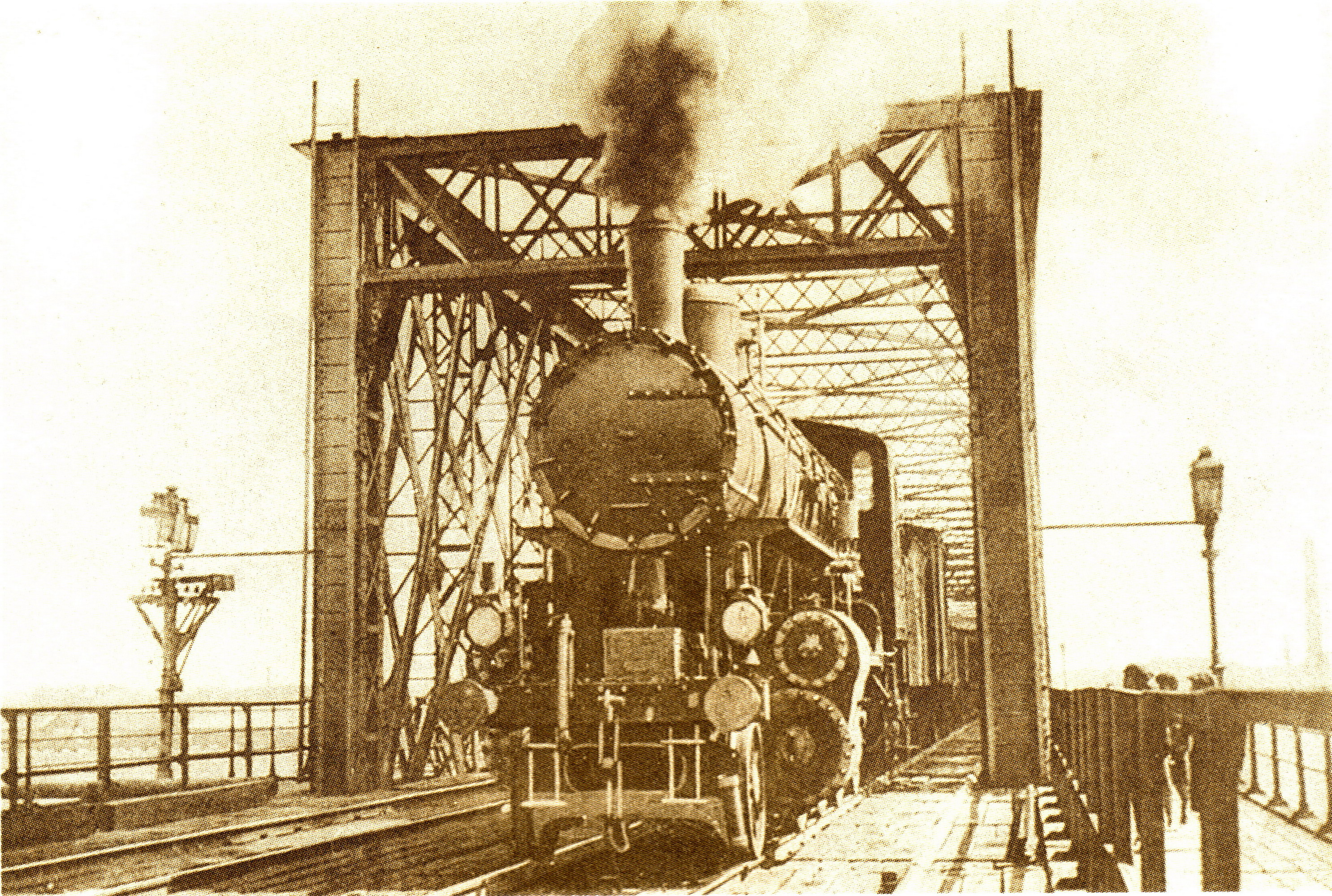
Southern Railway Bridge

== See also ==
- Bridges of Budapest
