= Budapest Keleti station =

Main railway terminal in Budapest, Hungary

Budapest Keleti
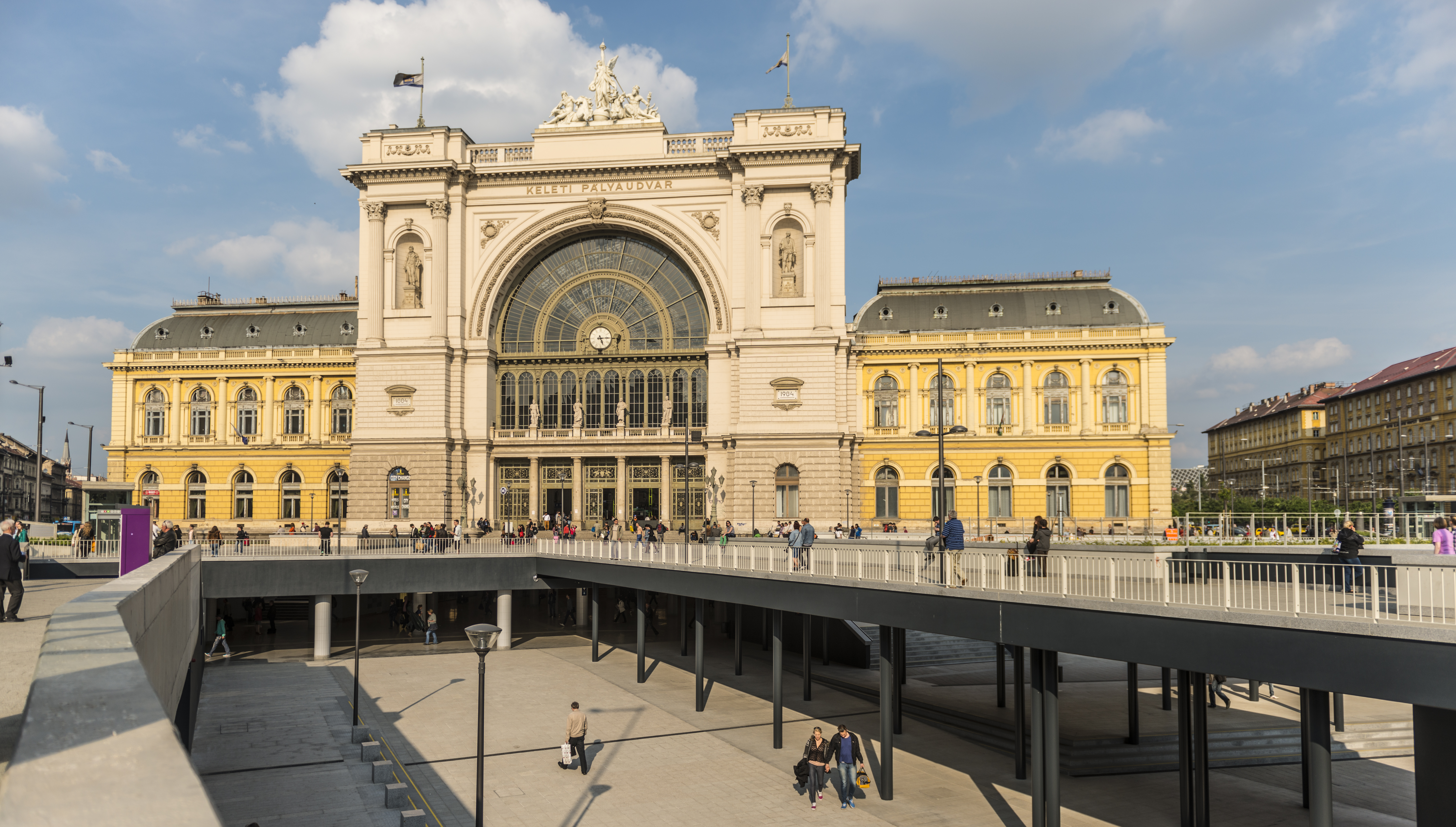
- Budapest Keleti viewed from the west

General information
- Location: Kerepesi út 2-4; 1087 Budapest; Hungary
- Coordinates: 47°30′01″N 19°05′02″E
- Elevation: 116 metres (381 ft)
- Owner: Hungarian State Railways (MÁV)
- Lines: Budapest–Hegyeshalom; Budapest–Hatvan; Budapest–Újszász–Szolnok; Budapest–Kunszentmiklós-Tass–Kelebia
- Platforms: 7
- Tracks: 13
- Connections: Metro: Tram: 23, 24; Trolleybus: 73, 76, 78, 79, 80; Bus: 5, 7, 7E, 8E, 20E, 30, 30A, 107, 108E, 110, 112, 133E, 230

Construction
- Architect: Gyula Rochlitz

Other information
- IATA code: XXQ
- Website: www.mavcsoport.hu/mav-start/belfoldi-utazas/vasutallomas/budapest-keleti

History
- Opened: 16 August 1884; 142 years ago
Services
Preceding station	MÁV START	Following station
Budapest-Kelenföld towards München Hbf	Railjet Express	Terminus
Budapest-Kelenföld towards Zürich HB	Railjet Express	Terminus
Terminus	InterCity	Szolnok towards Arad
Terminus	InterCity	Szolnok towards Békéscsaba
Terminus	InterCity	Szolnok towards Braşov
Terminus	InterCity	Szolnok towards Timişoara Nord
Terminus	InterCity	Hatvan towards Košice
Terminus	InterCity	Hatvan towards Budapest Nyugati via Tokaj
Budapest-Kelenföld towards Graz Hbf	InterCity	Terminus
Budapest-Kelenföld towards Gyékényes	InterCity	Terminus
Budapest-Kelenföld towards Kaposvár	InterCity	Terminus
Budapest-Kelenföld towards Ljubljana	InterCity	Terminus
Budapest-Kelenföld towards Pécs	InterCity	Terminus
Budapest-Kelenföld towards Sopron	InterCity	Terminus
Budapest-Kelenföld towards Split	InterCity	Terminus
Budapest-Kelenföld towards Szentgotthárd	InterCity	Terminus
Budapest-Kelenföld towards Wien Hbf	EuroCity	Terminus
Budapest-Kelenföld towards Wien Hbf	EuroCity	Szolnok towards Chop
Budapest-Kelenföld towards Wien Hbf	EuroCity	Szolnok towards Cluj Napoca
Budapest-Kelenföld towards Salzburg Hbf, Stuttgart Hbf or Zürich HB	EuroNight Kálmán Imre	Terminus
Ferencváros towards Wien Hbf	Dacia–Corvin Express	Szolnok towards Bucharest North
Terminus	Sebesvonat	Gödöllő towards Balmazújváros
Terminus	IR 85	Gödöllő towards Gyöngyös
Terminus	IR 87	Gödöllő towards Eger
Ferencváros towards Tatabánya	G10	Terminus
Terminus	G60	Kőbánya felső towards Szolnok
Terminus	Z60	Kőbánya felső towards Szolnok
Terminus	S60	Kőbánya felső towards Sülysáp
Terminus	S80	Kőbánya felső towards Füzesabony
Preceding station	Venice Simplon-Orient-Express	Following station
Paris-Est Terminus	Paris–Istanbul	Sinaia towards Istanbul
Location
- Location within Budapest

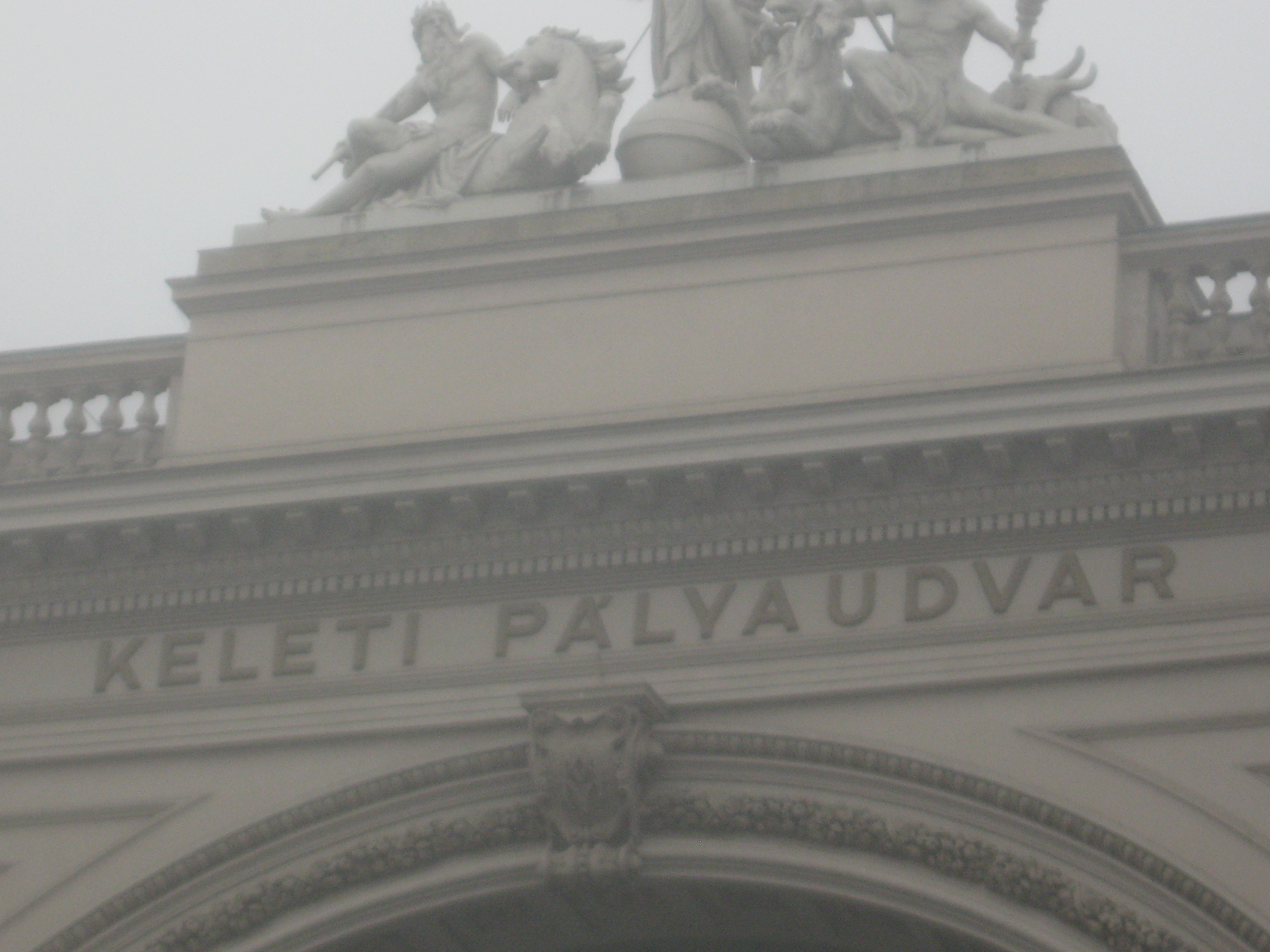
The inscription "Keleti Pályaudvar" visible on the main facade in Hungarian means "Eastern Station".

Budapest Keleti station (Hungarian: Keleti pályaudvar, pronounced [ˈkɛlɛti ˈpaːjɒudvɒr]; "eastern railway station") is the main international and inter-city railway terminal in Budapest, Hungary.

The station stands where Rákóczi Avenue splits to become Kerepesi Avenue and Thököly Avenue. Its name in 1891 originates not only from its position as the easternmost of the city's rail termini, but for its original role as a terminus of the lines from eastern Hungary including Transylvania, and the Balkans. In contrast, the Nyugati (western) railway station used to serve lines toward Vienna and Paris.

== Architecture ==
The building was designed in eclectic style by Gyula Rochlitz and János Feketeházy and constructed between 1881 and 1884. The main façade is adorned with two statues depicting railway pioneers James Watt and George Stephenson. Inside the station are frescos by Karoly Lotz.

Budapest Keleti has seven platforms serving thirteen tracks.

== Services ==
As of the July 2023 timetable change, the following services stop at Budapest Keleti:

- Railjet: services to Zürich HB and München.
- EuroCity: services to Vienna and Cluj Napoca.
- InterCity: services to Arad, Békéscsaba, Braşov, Timişoara Nord, Košice, Budapest Nyugati (via Tokaj), Graz, Gyékényes, Kaposvár, Ljubljana, Pécs, Sopron, Split, and Szentgotthárd.
- Overnight trains:
  - Dacia–Corvin Express: service between Vienna and Bucharest North.
  - EuroNight Kálmán Imre: service to Salzburg, Stuttgart, or Zürich.
- Sebesvonat: service to Balmazújváros.
- / /: four trains per hour to Gödöllő, half-hourly service to Vámosgyörk, and hourly service to Gyöngyös and Eger.
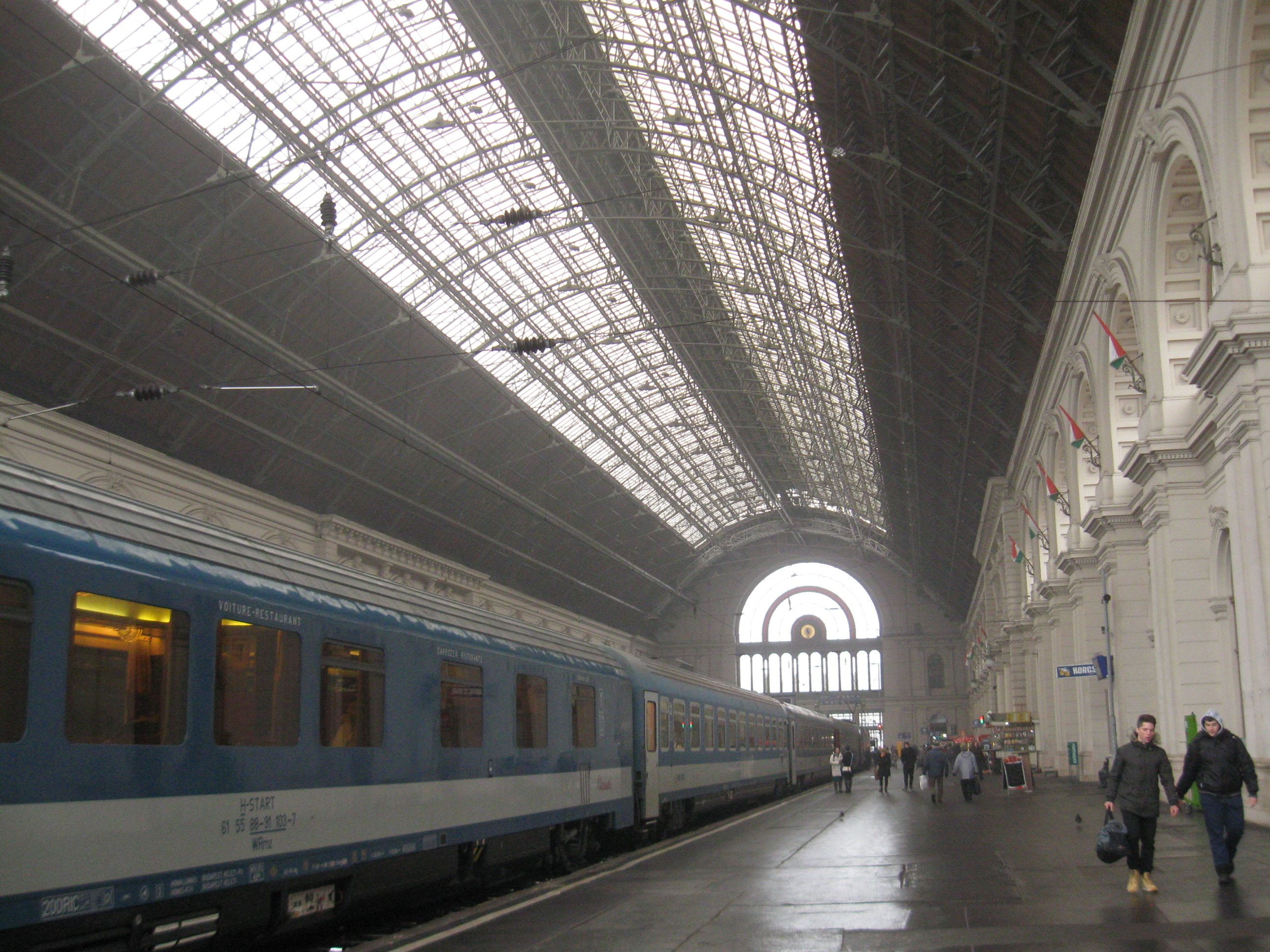
- The EuroCity 345 "Avala" train on the Wien Hauptbahnhof - Beograd route is standing at the Budapest Keleti station on January 26, 2016. A WRmz dining car is visible in the foreground. A series 1047 electric locomotive is barely noticeable in the distance.
  / /: frequent service to Sülysáp; some trains continuing to Nagykáta or Szolnok.

== Metro ==
Keleti pályaudvar metro station has been a station on the M2 (East-West) line of the Budapest Metro since the line opened in 1970. The metro station is 14 metres (46 ft) underground and 193 metres (633 ft) in length with the platform 180 metres (590 ft). In March 2014, Line 4 opened making Keleti a transfer point between the two Metro lines.

== Airport ==
A planned fast train service would connect the station with Budapest Liszt Ferenc International Airport. Since 36 of 53 Intercity services to Budapest operate from this railway station, it seems highly probable that this plan will materialize.

== Baross tér redevelopment ==
The facade of Budapest Keleti faces onto a large three-sided plaza called Baross tér. In 2005, work began to construct a pedestrian concourse and exits to allow better access between the Keleti pályaudvar Station on Budapest Metro Line 4 and long-distance train facilities. The statue of Gábor Baross, for whom the square is named, was returned to its location in December 2013 and work completed in March 2014.

== Public transport ==
Budapest Keleti railway station is located in the eighth district of Budapest, Hungary.

- Metro:
- Tram: 23, 24
- Trolleybus: 73, 76, 78, 79, 80
- Bus: 5, 7, 7E, 8E, 20E, 30, 30A, 107, 108E, 110, 112, 133E, 230
- Nocturnal lines: 907, 907A, 908, 908A, 931, 931A, 956, 973, 973A, 990

== In popular culture ==
The station is featured in the opening sequence of the 2011 film, Mission: Impossible – Ghost Protocol.

The railway station appeared briefly in the 2021 Marvel Cinematic Universe film Black Widow.
