= Emonika =

Coordinates: 46°3′33.14″N 14°30′29.32″E

- Interactive map of the Emonika area

General information
- Construction started: 2024

Technical details
- Floor area: 180.000 m²

Emonika will be a multipurpose facility in Ljubljana, Slovenia at the intersection of Dunajska, Vilharjeva, and Masarykova streets in the centre of the city. It will be located in the immediate vicinity of the main bus and railway stations in Ljubljana. This modern urban complex will include a shopping centre, business premises, hotels, and apartments.

The name Emonika is derived from the Roman name of the city Emona, which stood here during the Roman Empire.

The complex will feature 187 apartments.

Emonika will offer office premises on both the northern and southern sides of the railway, with a total capacity exceeding 30,000 m^{2}. These spaces are designed for company headquarters, large corporations, and medium-sized enterprises.

In addition to the office buildings, there will be a shopping centre of 21,500 m^{2} providing space for approx. 80 stores. The complex will include hotels, which will offer over 380 rooms and serviced apartments, targeting business guests and tourists.

== History ==
- 2003: Publication of the International tender.
- 2007: Signing of the Joint venture agreement (JVA) by: TriGranit & Holding Slovenske železnice.
- 2006: Adoption of the spatial plan with further associated changes in 2009 and 2011 by the City of Ljubljana including solutions for the entire Ljubljana Passenger Centre area.
- 2014: Termination of the JVA and subsequent withdrawal of TriGranit from the project.
- 2017: Prime Kapital enters the project with plans to start construction in 2018.
- 2019: The OTP group acquires ownership of the property.

Activity on the project site began with the acquisition of a permit for demolition works in 2008 under the development company TriGranit. Due to the economic crisis and the complexity of construction on the location, the investor had to revise plans, leading to a postponement of the start of construction. Following several years of stagnation and negotiations with the Slovenian government, TriGranit withdrew from the project. Subsequently, the company Prime Kapital from Bucharest (backed by the founders of the South African fund NEPI), assumed control of the project, and announced the commencement of construction in 2018. The revised plan encompassed the construction of the new railway and bus station and the development of a new shopping centre.

By 2019, OTP Group became involved in the project. Mendota Invest d.o.o. as a special purpose vehicle took ownership of the real estate at the beginning of 2020. Final building permits for the construction of Emonika were received in February 2024 and the construction is scheduled to start in 2024. The project is expected to take approximately 3 years. The estimated total investment value stands at more than 350 million euros.

== Location ==
Emonika is situated in the heart of Ljubljana, Slovenia at the intersection of Dunajska, Vilharjeva and Masarykova streets.
