= Környe =

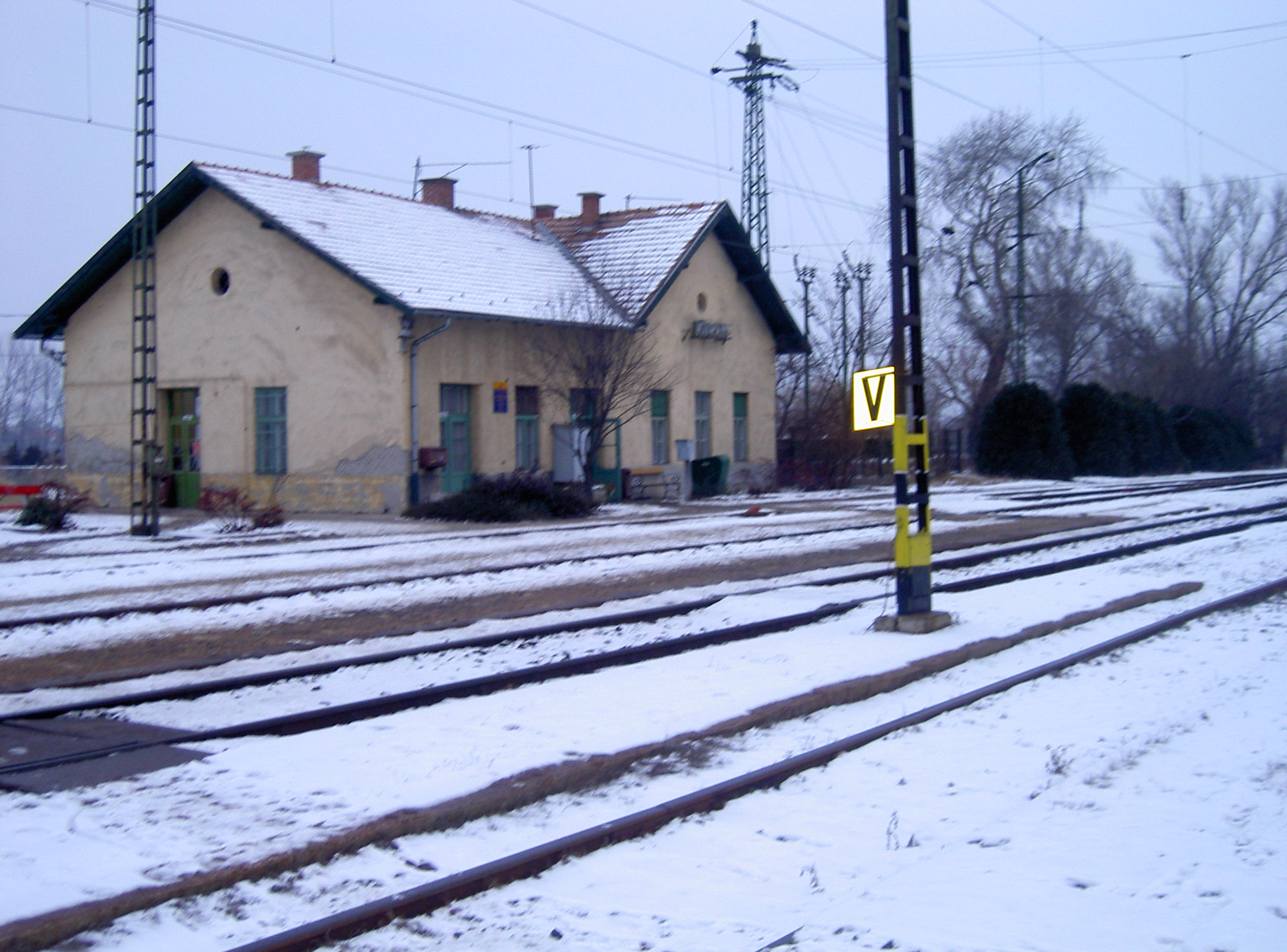

- Flag Coat of arms

- Location of Komárom-Esztergom county in Hungary

- Location of Környe
- Coordinates: 47.54534°N 18.32697°E
- Country: Hungary
- County: Komárom-Esztergom

Government
  - Mayor: Beke László (Ind.)

Area
  - Total: 45.37 km^{2} (17.52 sq mi)

Population (2022)
  - Total: 4,604
  - Density: 101.5/km^{2} (262.8/sq mi)
- Time zone: UTC+1 (CET)
  - Summer (DST): UTC+2 (CEST)
- Postal code: 2851
- Area code: 34

Környe (German: Kirne) is a village in Komárom-Esztergom county, Hungary. This Hungarian town had Roman beginnings. Archeologists uncovered remains of a Roman fortress and villas, proving its existence as a strategic spot for the Roman Empire near its frontier.
