= Suburban trains in Budapest =

Budapesti elővárosi vonatok

Overview
- Owner: Hungarian State Railways
- Locale: Budapest metropolitan area, Hungary
- Transit type: Commuter rail
- Number of lines: 14
- Number of stations: 333

Operation
- Operator: Hungarian State Railways

Technical
- Track gauge: 1,435 mm (4 ft 8 1/2 in)

Suburban trains in Budapest are known in Hungarian as Budapesti elővárosi vonatok, serving fourteen lines in the Budapest metropolitan area, three of which are part of the BHÉV system. The system is operated by Hungarian State Railways.

== Services ==
The HÉV lines are indicated by a H letter followed by a number. H5 terminates at Szentendre, H6 at Ráckeve, H8 at Gödöllő and 9 at Csömör. H7 does not cross the administrative boundary of Budapest. The numbering was introduced in 2011, continuing with the numbering of the existing M4 subway line.

From 15 December 2013, suburban trains departing from the Budapest-Déli Railway Terminal were piloted, and from 14 December 2014 all suburban trains received numbered services.

Trains that stop at every station are designated as S (similar to numerous S-train services), trains making fewer stops are designated as G, and express trains are designated as Z.

== Lines ==
As of 2023, the following services are operated:

Service	Route	Frequency
Metro Line M5 (Budapest Metro)	Batthyány tér – Békásmegyer – Szentendre	10-20 minutes
Metro Line M6 (Budapest Metro)	Közvágóhíd – Dunaharaszti – Tököl – Ráckeve	15-60 minutes on weekdays and 30-60 minutes on weekends
Metro Line M7 (Budapest Metro)	Boráros tér – Kvassay híd – Csepel	6-15 minutes
Metro Line M8 (Budapest Metro)	Örs vezér tere – Cinkota – Gödöllő	30-60 minutes
Metro Line M9 (Budapest Metro)	Örs vezér tere – Cinkota – Csömör	30-60 minutes
	Budapest-Déli – Budapest-Kelenföld – Bicske – Tatabánya – Komárom – Győr	60 minutes
	Budapest-Keleti – Budapest-Kelenföld – Bicske – Tatabánya – Komárom – Győr	Two outbound trips per day
	Budapest-Déli – Budapest-Kelenföld – Bicske – Tatabánya – Oroszlány	60 minutes
	Budapest-Nyugati – Kőbánya-Kispest – Cegléd – Kecskemét – Kiskunfélegyháza – Szeged	One outbound trip per day
	Budapest Nyugati – Kőbánya-Kispest – Ócsa – Dabas – Táborfalva – Lajosmizse	60 minutes on weekdays and 120 minutes on weekends
	Budapest-Déli – Budapest-Kelenföld – Tárnok – Martonvásár – Kápolnásnyék – Székesfehérvár (– Fonyód)	Two round-trips per day
	Budapest-Déli – Budapest-Kelenföld – Velence – Székesfehérvár	One round-trip on weekends
	Budapest-Déli – Budapest-Kelenföld – Tárnok – Martonvásár – Kápolnásnyék – Székesfehérvár	30 minutes on weekdays and 60 minutes on weekends
	Budapest-Déli – Budapest-Kelenföld – Tárnok – Martonvásár – Kápolnásnyék – Székesfehérvár – Siófok – Fonyód – Keszthely	One outbound trip per day
	Kőbánya-Kispest – Budapest-Kelenföld – Tárnok – Martonvásár	60 minutes
	Budapest-Déli – Budapest-Kelenföld – Százhalombatta (– Pusztaszabolcs – Dombóvár)	60 minutes
	Dombóvár – Sárbogárd – Pusztaszabolcs – Budapest-Kelenföld – Budapest-Déli	Two inbound trips on weekdays
	Budapest-Déli – Budapest-Kelenföld – Százhalombatta – Pusztaszabolcs – Dombóvár	One outbound trip except Saturdays
	Budapest-Déli – Budapest-Kelenföld – Százhalombatta – Pusztaszabolcs – Dunaújváros	60 minutes
	Budapest-Déli – Budapest-Kelenföld – Százhalombatta – Pusztaszabolcs – Dunaújváros	Rush-hour service on weekdays
	Kőbánya-Kispest – Budapest-Kelenföld – Tárnok – Martonvásár – Kápolnásnyék – Székesfehérvár	60 minutes
	Tárnok – Budapest-Kelenföld – Budapest-Déli	One inbound trip per day
	Budapest-Nyugati – Kőbánya-Kispest – Úllő – Monor (– Cegléd – Szolnok)	30 minutes
	Szolnok – Cegléd – Monor – Kőbánya-Kispest – Budapest-Nyugati	Two inbound trips on weekdays
	Budapest-Nyugati – Kőbánya-Kispest – Monor – Cegléd – Szolnok	60 minutes
	Budapest-Keleti – Rákos – Sülysáp (– Nagykáta – Szolnok)	30 minutes
	Budapest-Keleti – Rákos – Sülysáp (– Nagykáta – Szolnok)	Seven round-trips per day
	Budapest-Keleti – Rákos – Sülysáp – Nagykáta – Szolnok	60 minutes
	Budapest-Nyugati – Vác (– Szob)	30 minutes
	Budapest-Nyugati – Vác – Szob	Rush-hour service on weekdays
	Budapest-Nyugati – Vác – Szob	60 minutes
	Budapest-Nyugati – Vácrátót – Vác	60 minutes
	Budapest-Nyugati – Vácrátót – Vác	Weekday rush-hour service
	Budapest-Nyugati – Pilisvörösvár – Esztergom	Individual services
	Budapest-Nyugati – Pilisvörösvár – Esztergom	30 minutes
	Pilisvörösvár – Rákos	30 minutes
	Budapest-Keleti – Rákos – Gödöllő (– Aszód – Hatvan – Füzesabony)	30 minutes
	Isaszeg – Budapest-Keleti	Three inbound trips on weekdays

== Future developments ==
Plans exist to build a cross-city tunnel linking Déli station with Nyugati station to provide through services between the two.

Between the Budapest-Kelenföld and Ferencváros stations, the construction of the third and in some sections the fourth track will be built, in addition to the complete renovation of the existing tracks.

New stations are being built at Közvágóhíd and Újbuda under the name Nádorkert.
