= Budapest Déli station =

Railway station in Budapest, Hungary

Budapest Déli
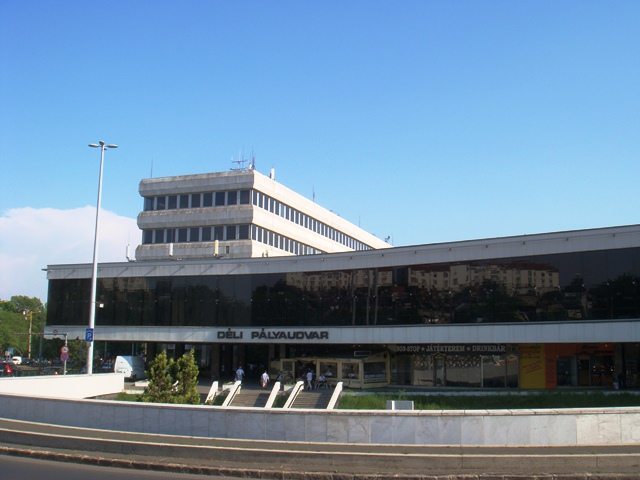
- Budapest Déli station main entrance

General information
- Location: Krisztina körút 37/a Budapest; Hungary
- Coordinates: 47°29′58″N 19°01′30″E
- Platforms: 2 side platforms; 5 island platforms
- Tracks: 12
Services
Preceding station	MÁV START	Following station
Budapest-Kelenföld towards Szombathely	InterCity	Terminus
Budapest-Kelenföld towards Keszthely	InterCity	Terminus
Budapest-Kelenföld towards Zalaegerszeg	InterCity	Terminus
Budapest-Kelenföld towards Tapolca	InterCity	Terminus
Budapest-Kelenföld towards Nagykanizsa	InterCity	Terminus
Budapest-Kelenföld towards Ljubljana	InterCity	Terminus
Budapest-Kelenföld towards Zagreb	Expresszvonat	Terminus
Budapest-Kelenföld towards Balatonszentgyörgy	InterRegio	Terminus
Budapest-Kelenföld towards Balatonfüred	InterRegio	Terminus
Budapest-Kelenföld towards Győr	S10	Terminus
Budapest-Kelenföld towards Oroszlány	S12	Terminus
Budapest-Kelenföld towards Pusztaszabolcs	S40	Terminus
Budapest-Kelenföld towards Dunaújváros	S42	Terminus
Budapest-Kelenföld towards Székesfehérvár	Z30	Terminus
Location

Budapest Déli station (Hungarian: Budapest-Déli pályaudvar, pronounced [ˈbudɒpɛʃt ˈdeːli ˈpaːjɒudvɒr]; lit. 'Budapest southern station'), known to locals and foreigners alike simply as the Déli is one of the three main railway stations in Budapest, Hungary.

Located in the 1st District (Várkerület) of Budapest, the station is located in Buda, and primarily serves towns and cities in Transdanubia. The station was first opened in 1861 on the line towards Rijeka (then known as Fiume and part of the Austro-Hungarian Empire) on the Adriatic Sea. Significant damage to the station occurred in the Second World War, and the modern façade of the railway station (the only modern building in all of Budapest's major rail terminals) was eventually completed in 1975.

The station is a major transport hub for the city, with BKV Zrt. trams and buses serving adjoining districts. A metro station (opened in 1972) is located underneath the terminal building, being the western terminus of the M2 (East-West) line of the Budapest Metro.

== Station layout ==
Budapest Déli has five island platform and two side platforms serving twelve tracks. All tracks terminate at the station.

== Public transport ==
Budapest Déli railway station is located in the 1st district of Budapest, Hungary.

- Metro:
- Tram: 17, 56, 56A, 59, 59A, 59B, 61
- Bus: 21, 21A, 39, 102, 139, 140, 140A
- Nocturnal lines: 960, 990

== Future developments ==
Plans exist to build a cross-city tunnel linking Déli station with Budapest-Nyugati Railway Terminal.
