= Budapest Nyugati station =

Railway station in Budapest, Hungary

Budapest Nyugati
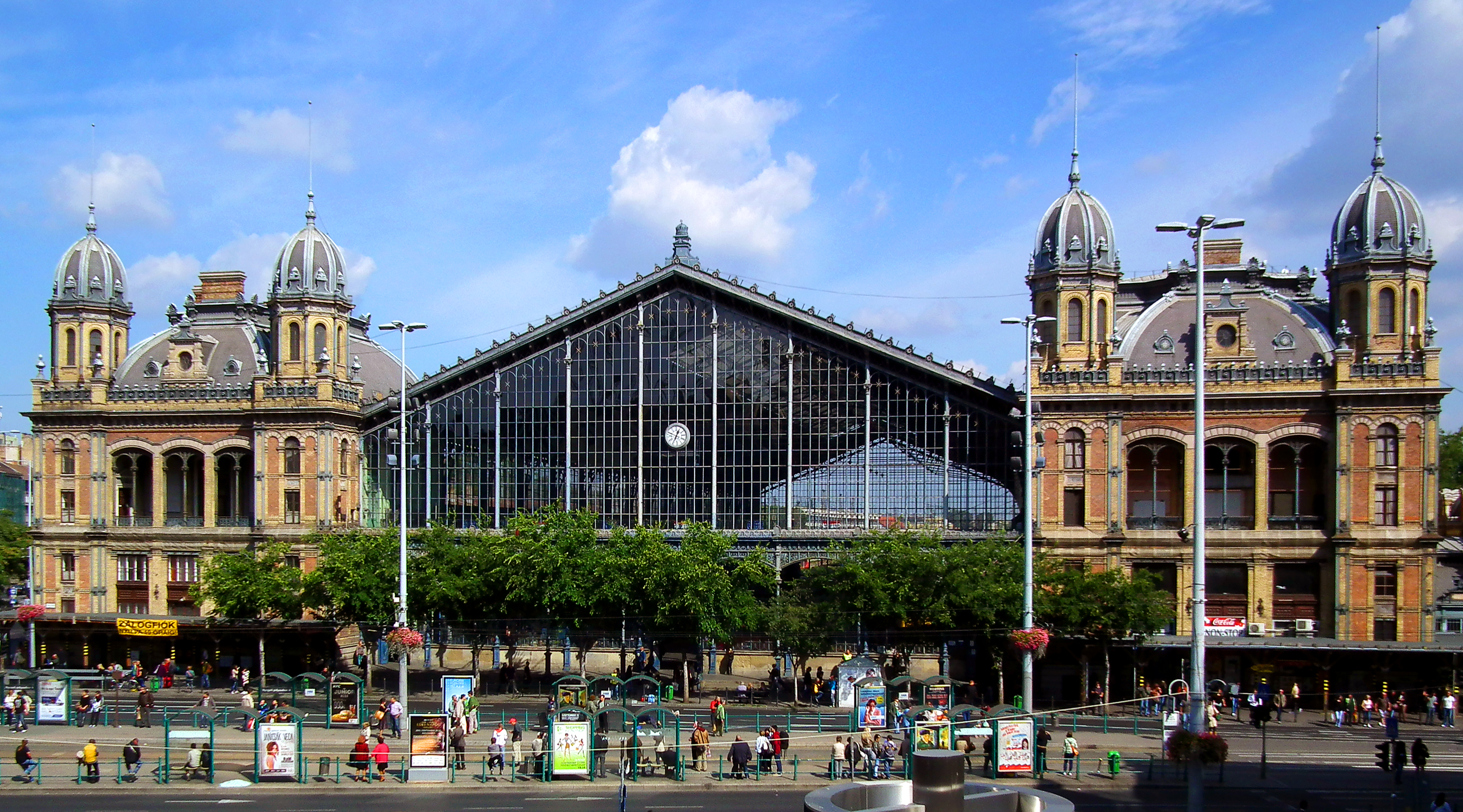
- Budapest Western railway station

General information
- Location: Teréz krt. 55; Budapest; Hungary
- Coordinates: 47°30′39″N 19°03′27″E
- Platforms: 9
- Tracks: 17
Services
Preceding station	MÁV START	Following station
Terminus	InterCity	Zugló towards Budapest Keleti via Tokaj
Terminus	InterCity	Zugló towards Mukachevo
Terminus	InterCity	Zugló towards Szeged
Terminus	InterCity	Zugló towards Záhony
Vác towards Brno main	EuroCity	Terminus
Terminus	EuroCity	Vác towards Terespol
Vác towards Hamburg-Altona	EuroCity	Terminus
Terminus	EuroNight Metropol	Vác towards Breclav
Terminus	InterRegio	Zugló towards Debrecen
Terminus	S20	Zugló towards Szeged
Terminus	S21	Zugló towards Kecskemét
Terminus	S50	Zugló towards Szolnok
Terminus	G50	Zugló towards Szolnok
Terminus	Z50	Zugló towards Szolnok
Rákosrendező towards Szob	S70	Terminus
Rákosrendező towards Szob	G70	Terminus
Vác towards Szob	Z70	Terminus
Rákosrendező towards Vác	S71	Terminus
Rákospalota-Újpest towards Vác	G71	Terminus
Rákosrendező towards Esztergom	S72	Terminus
Újpest towards Esztergom	Z72	Terminus
Location

Budapest Nyugati station (Hungarian: Nyugati pályaudvar, pronounced [ˈɲuɡɒti ˈpaːjɒudvɒr]; lit. 'western railway station'), generally referred to simply as Nyugati, is one of the three main railway terminals in Budapest, Hungary. The station is on the Pest side of Budapest, accessible by the 4 and 6 tramline and the M3 metro line.

== Layout ==
The station is a stub-end terminal, with the tracks exiting to the northeast. There are nine platforms serving seventeen tracks. There is a metro station beneath the railway station; buses and trams are accessed at street level.

== History ==
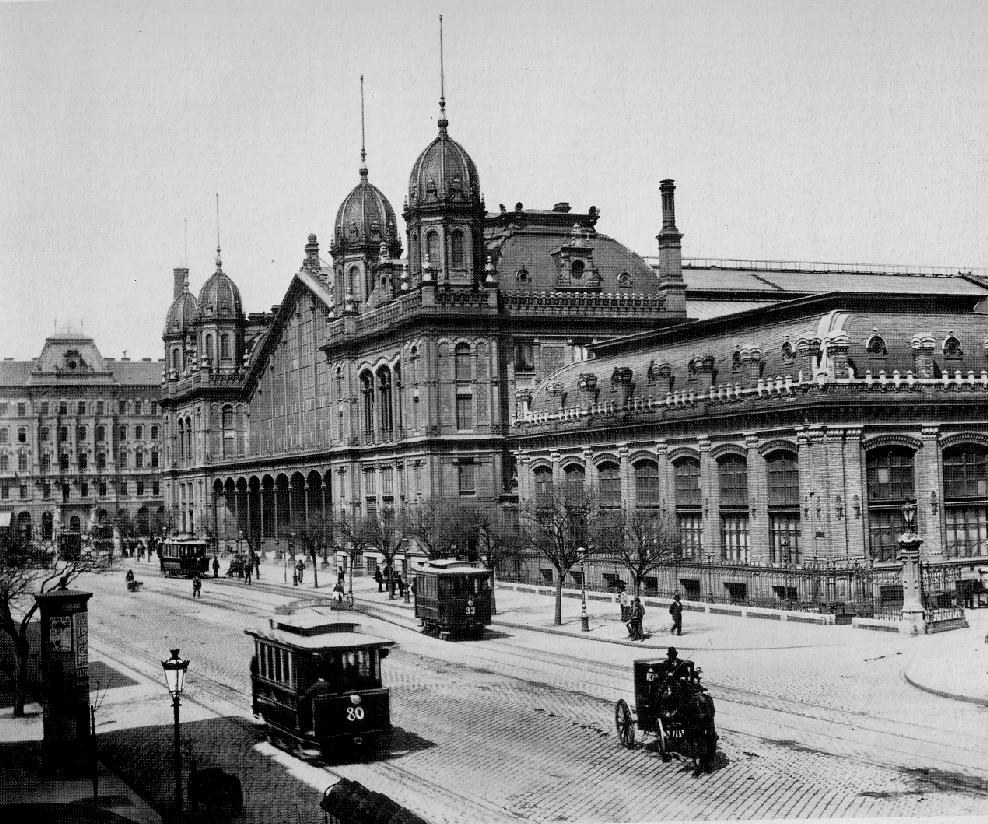
Budapest Nyugati station in the 19th century

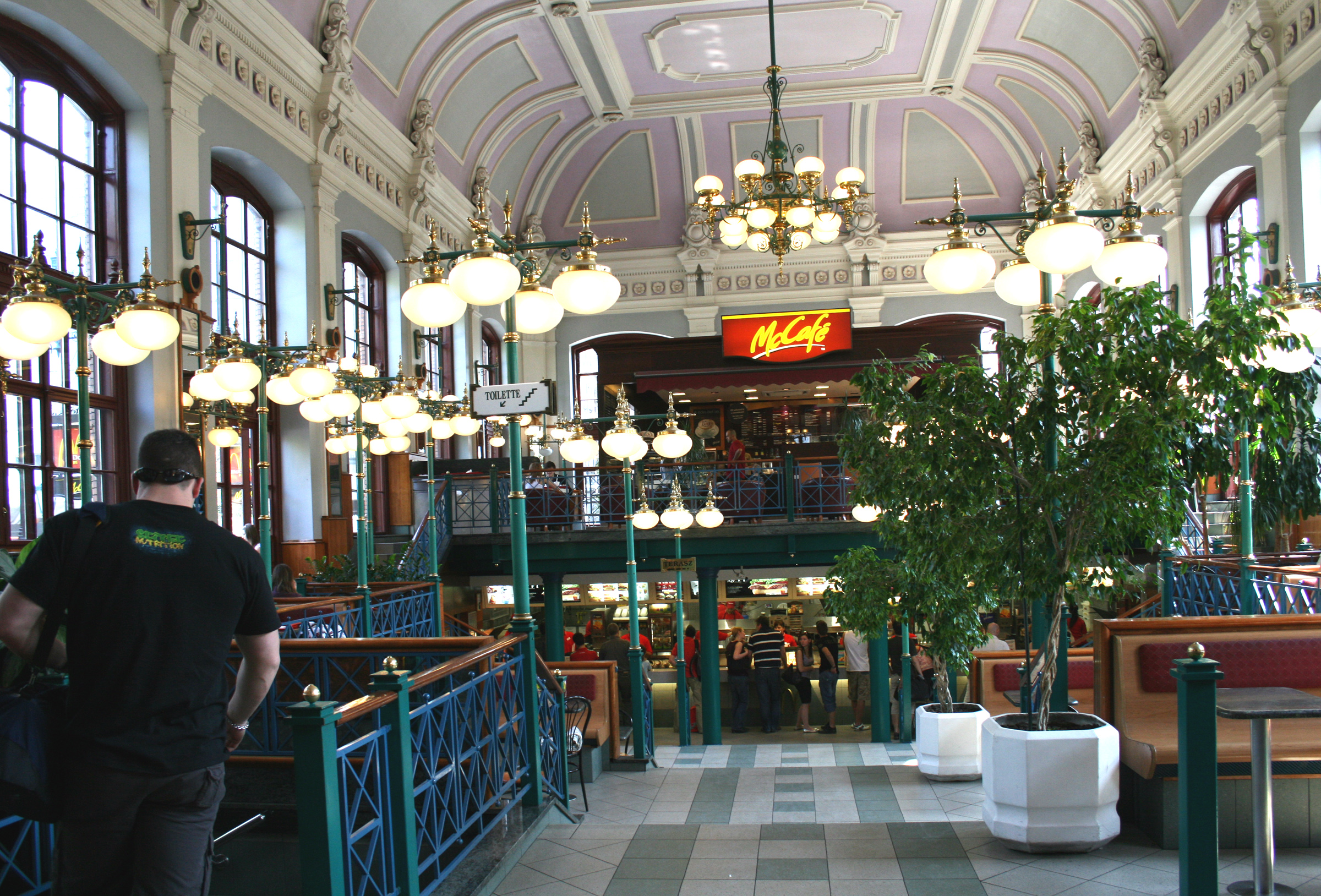
Interior of the McDonald's in the Budapest-Nyugati station

The station was designed by Auguste de Serres and was built by the Eiffel Company. It was opened on 28 October 1877. It replaced another station, which was the terminus of Hungary's first railway line, the Pest–Vác line (constructed in 1846). This building was demolished in order to construct the Grand Boulevard.

The station got its name from the adjacent Western Square ('Nyugati tér'), a major intersection where Teréz körút (Theresia Boulevard), Szent István körút (Saint Stephen Boulevard), Váci út (Váci Avenue), and Bajcsy-Zsilinszky út (Bajcsy-Zsilinszky Avenue) converge. The square also serves as a transport hub with several bus routes, tram routes 4 and 6, and a station on M3 of the Budapest Metro.

Since 2007 Hungarian State Railways (MÁV) has operated regular services between the terminal and Budapest Ferenc Liszt International Airport Terminal 1, although Terminal 1 has been closed since 2012 and all departures and arrivals have been consolidated in Terminal 2A and 2B, which is 4 kilometers away.

Beside the terminal and partially above its open area there is the WestEnd City Center shopping mall. Inside the station is a McDonald's restaurant which has been described as the "most elegant" McDonald's in the world.

The music video for Gwen Stefani's 2008 single Early Winter was partly shot at Nyugati. Starting in May 2016 the key scenes of the movie Terminal were shot over 27 nights.

Certain parts of the historic terminal building have recently been renovated. More renovations and changes to the immediate surroundings of the building are planned based on plans by London-based architectural firm Grimshaw.

== Services ==
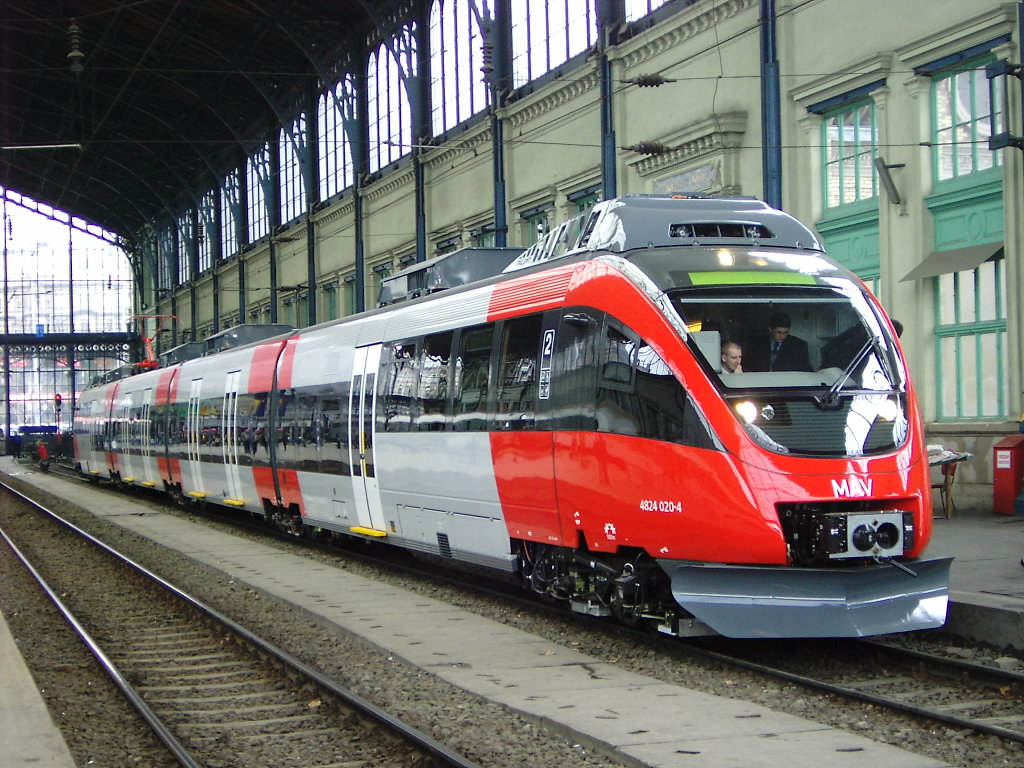
Budapest-Nyugati station

As of the July 2023 timetable change, the following services stop at Budapest Nyugati:

- InterCity: services to Budapest Keleti (via Tokaj), Mukachevo, Szeged, and Záhony.
- EuroCity: services to Brno main, Terespol, and Hamburg-Altona.
- EuroNight: overnight service to Breclav and Berlin.
- InterRegio: service to Debrecen.
- : hourly service to Kecskemét.
- / /: frequent service to Szolnok.
- / /: frequent service to Szob.
- /: frequent service to Vác.
- /: frequent service to Esztergom.
