= Ljubljana railway station =

Railway station in Ljubljana, Slovenia

Ljubljana
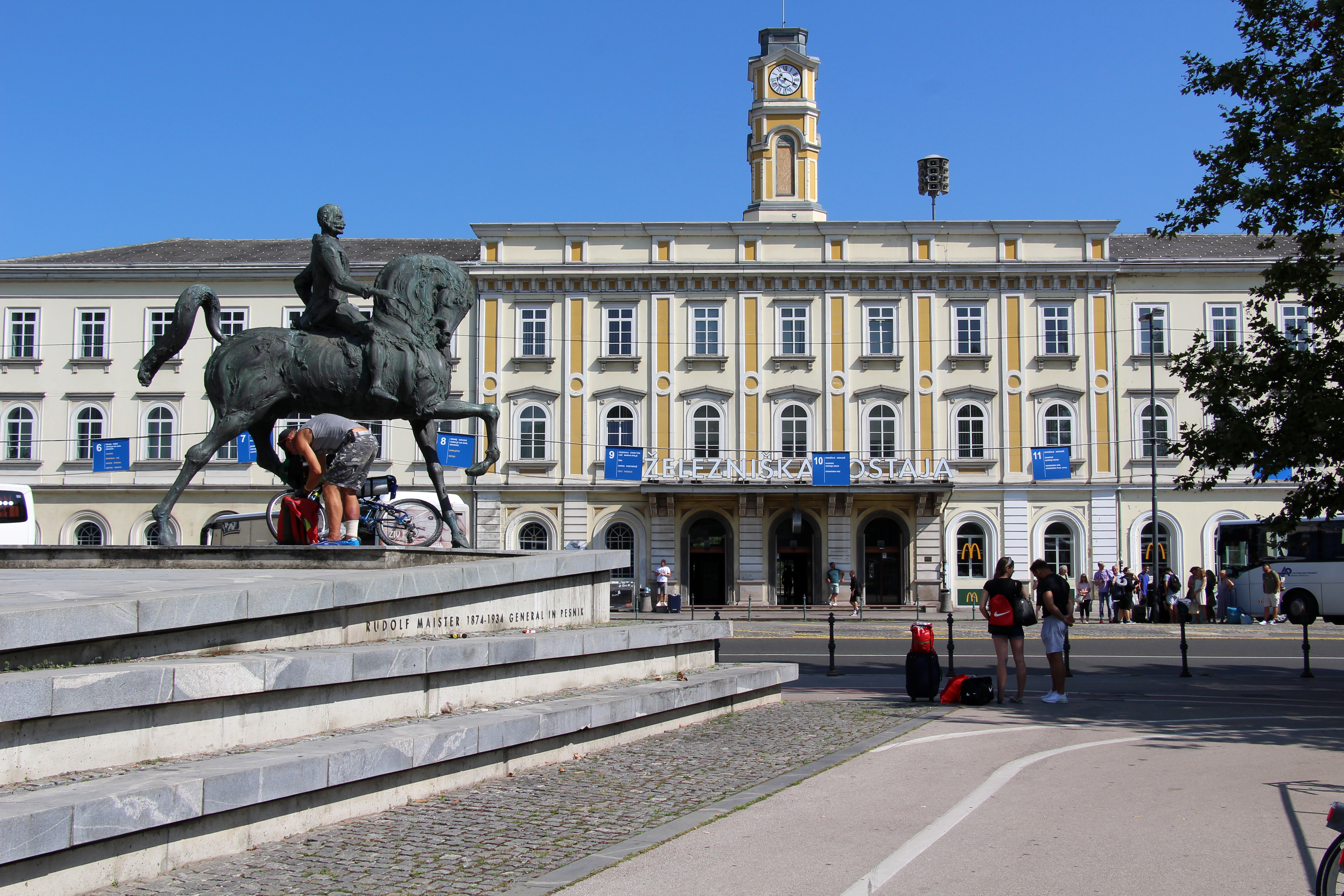

General information
- Location: Trg Osvobodilne fronte 6; 1000 Ljubljana; Slovenia
- Coordinates: 46°03′32″N 14°30′47″E
- Elevation: 289.5 m (950 ft)
- Owner: Slovenian Railways
- Operator: Slovenian Railways
- Lines: Spielfeld-Straß–Trieste railway Tarvisio–Ljubljana Railway; Dobova–Ljubljana Railway; Ljubljana–Metlika Railway; Ljubljana–Kamnik Railway
- Connections: Bus: Ljubljana Passenger Transport

History
- Opened: 16 September 1849
- Rebuilt: 1980
Location
- Location within Slovenia

The Ljubljana railway station (Slovene: Železniška postaja Ljubljana) is the principal railway station in Ljubljana, the capital of Slovenia. It was completed on 18 April 1848, a year before the Austrian Southern Railway, connecting Vienna and Trieste, reached Ljubljana.

== Location ==
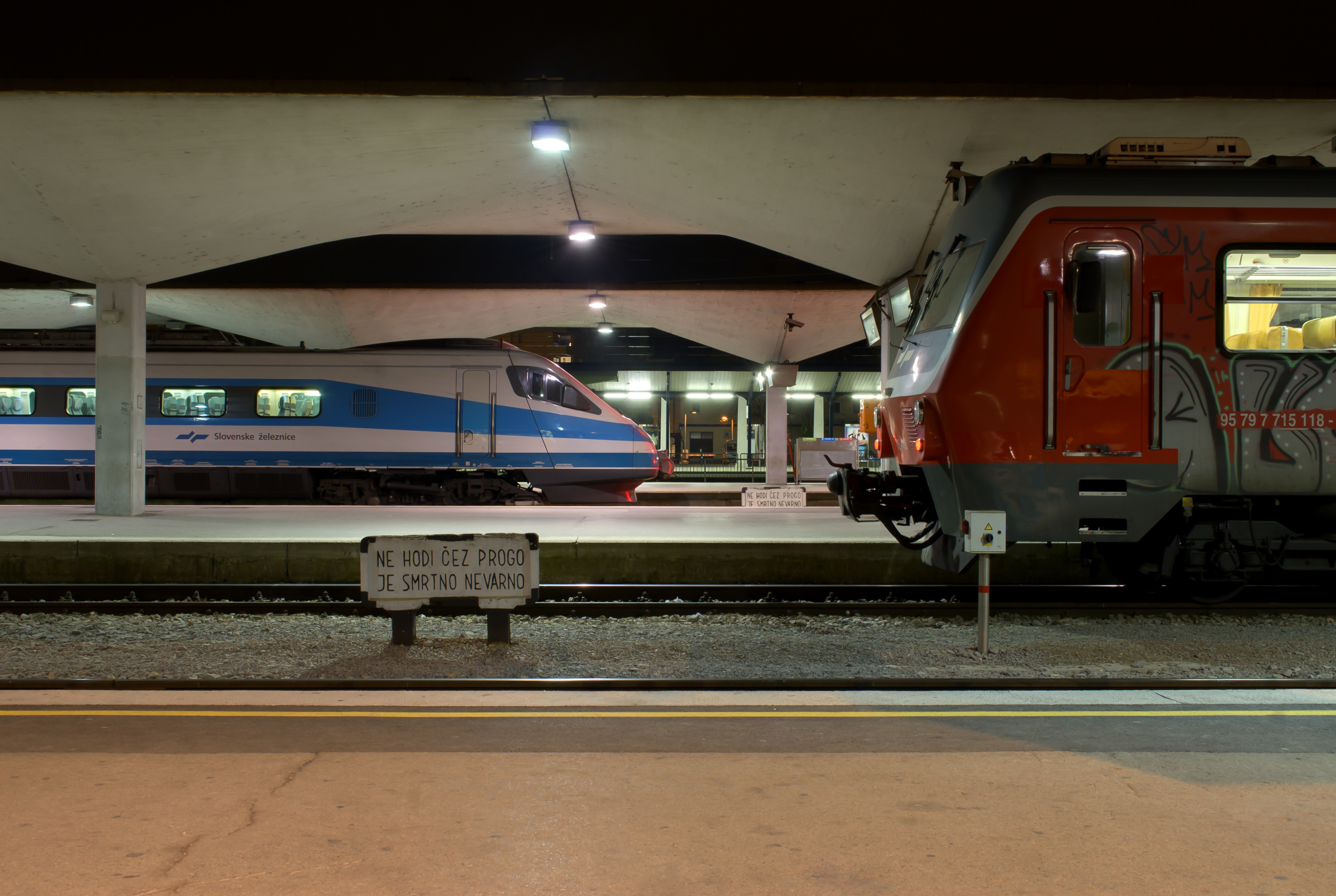
A Pendolino at Ljubljana Station

Ljubljana railway station is located in the city of Ljubljana, the capital of Slovenia. It is the main railway station in the country and serves as a hub for both domestic and international trains. The station is located in the city center, making it easily accessible by foot, car, or public transportation. It is also near many popular tourist destinations such as Ljubljana Castle and the Triple Bridge.

== History ==
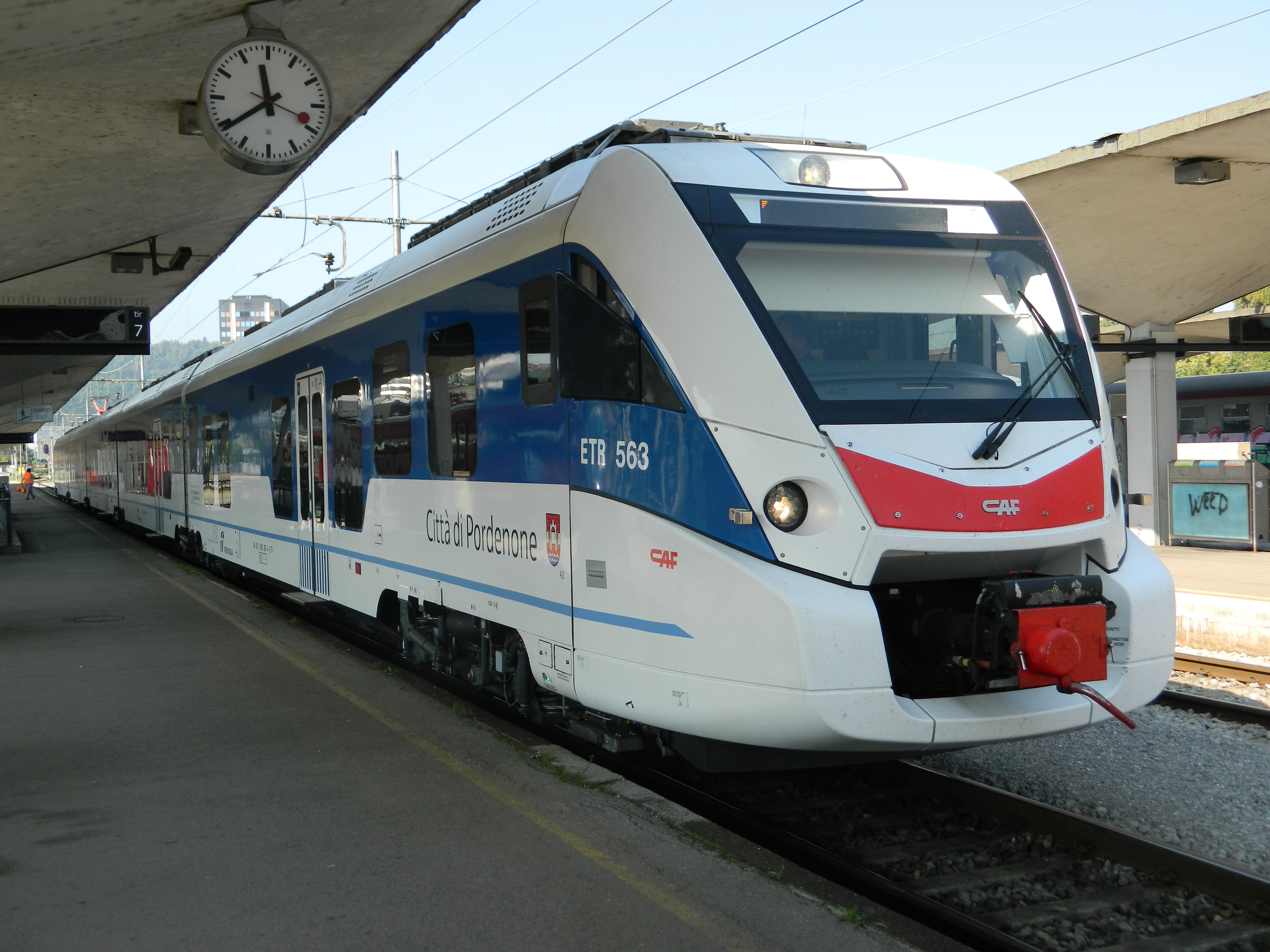
An ETR 563 at Ljubljana station.

The Ljubljana railway station was completed on 18 April 1848.

James Joyce spent a night at Ljubljana railway station on his way to Trieste in October 1904, because he mistakenly thought that he had arrived at his destination. In his honour, a small monument, created by the sculptor Jakov Brdar, was erected at Ljubljana railway station on Bloomsday in 2003. The Slovenian Railway Museum is located nearby. There are plans to renovate the station as part of the Emonika urban project.

The building was renovated in 1980 by the architect Marko Mušič.

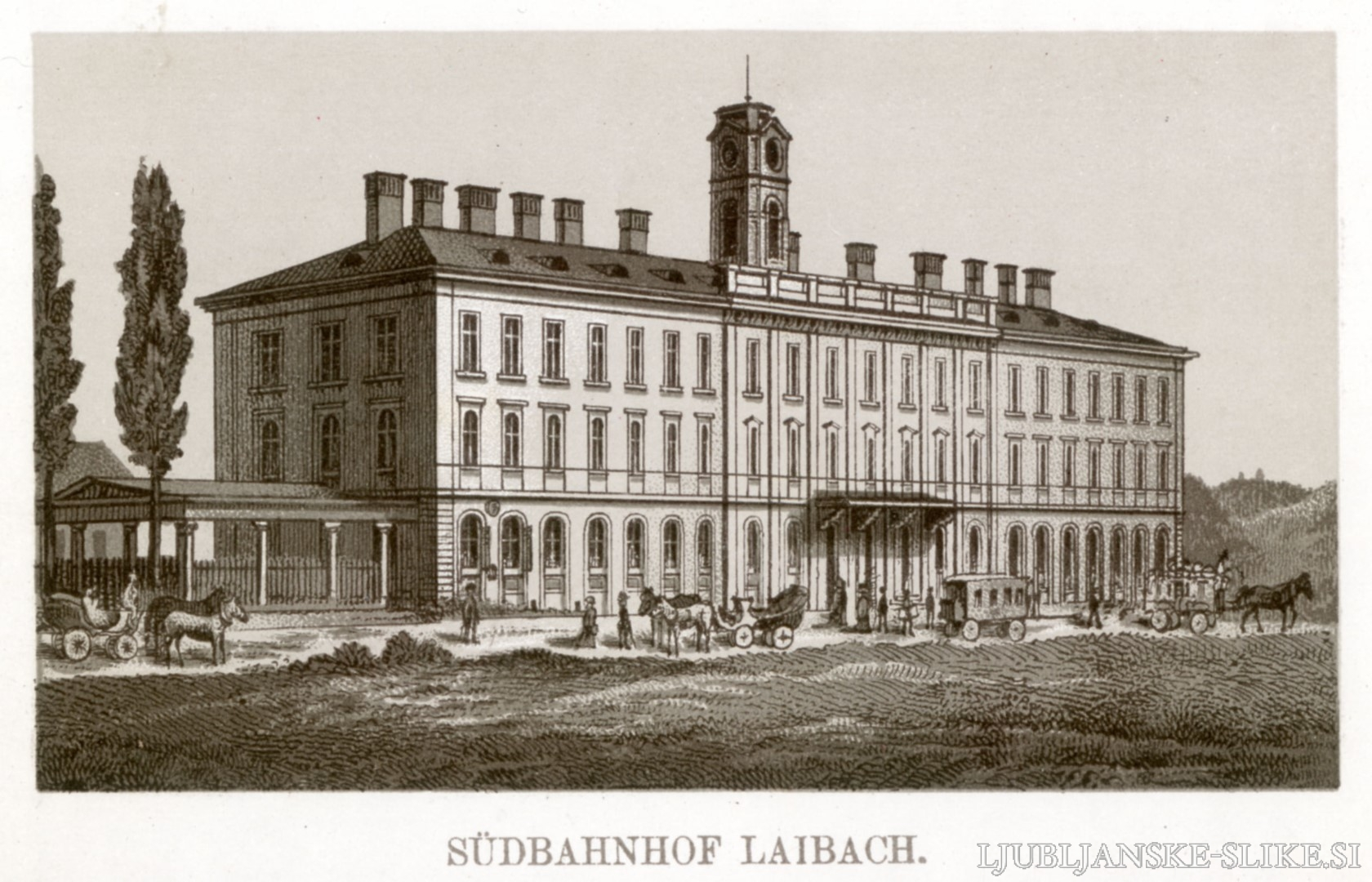
Ljubljana railway station (1880)

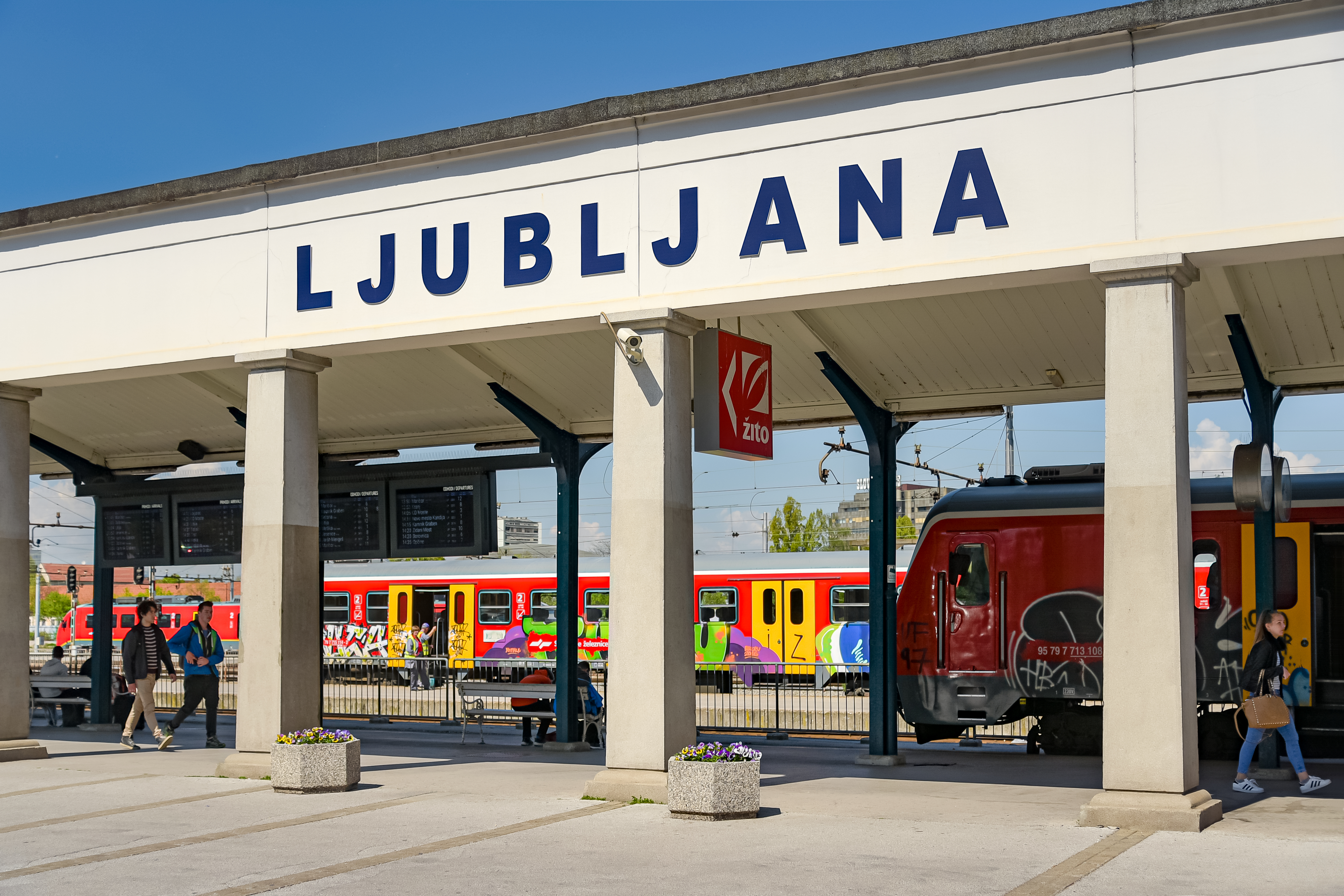
Ljubljana station platforms.

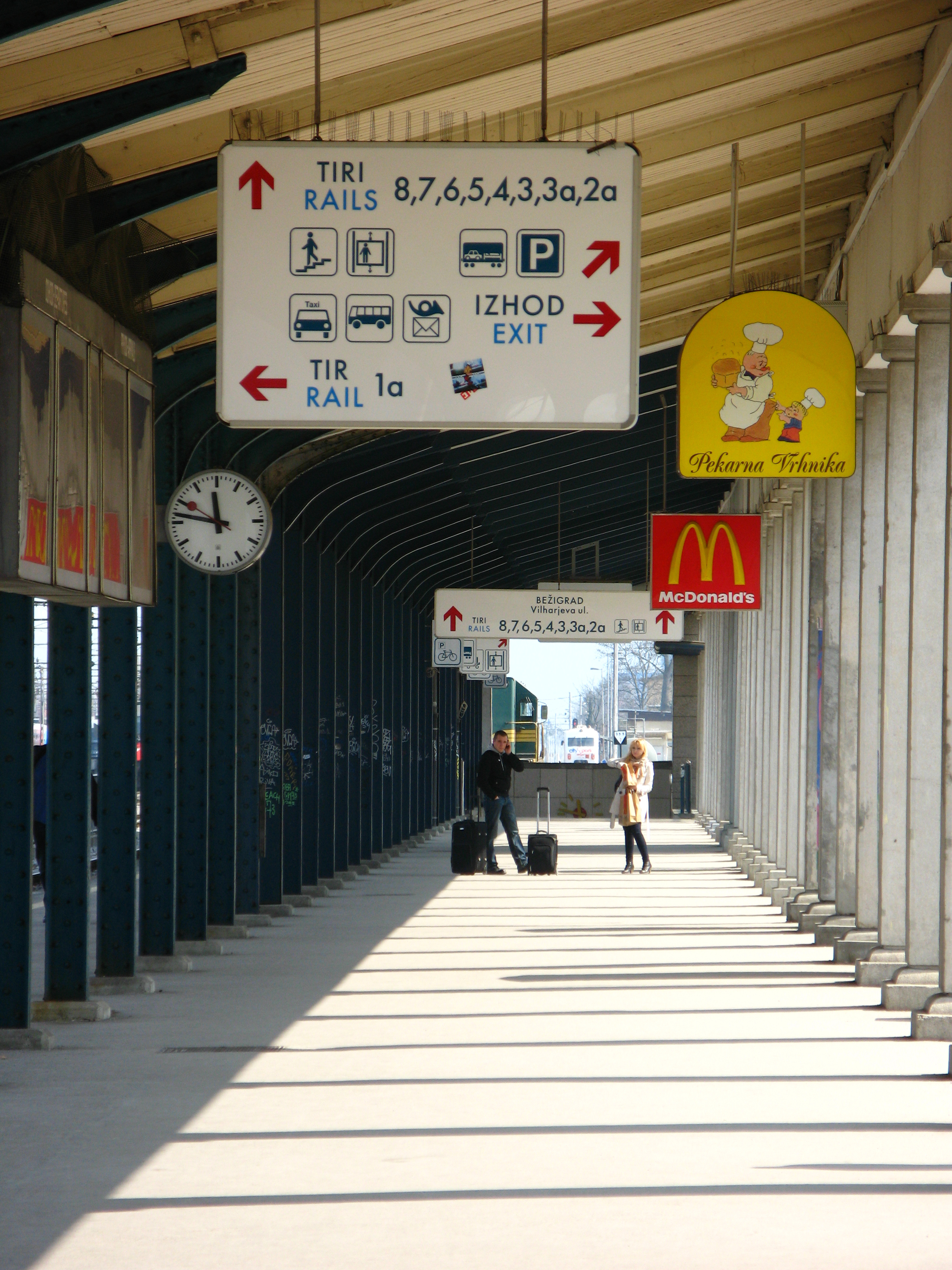
Hallway

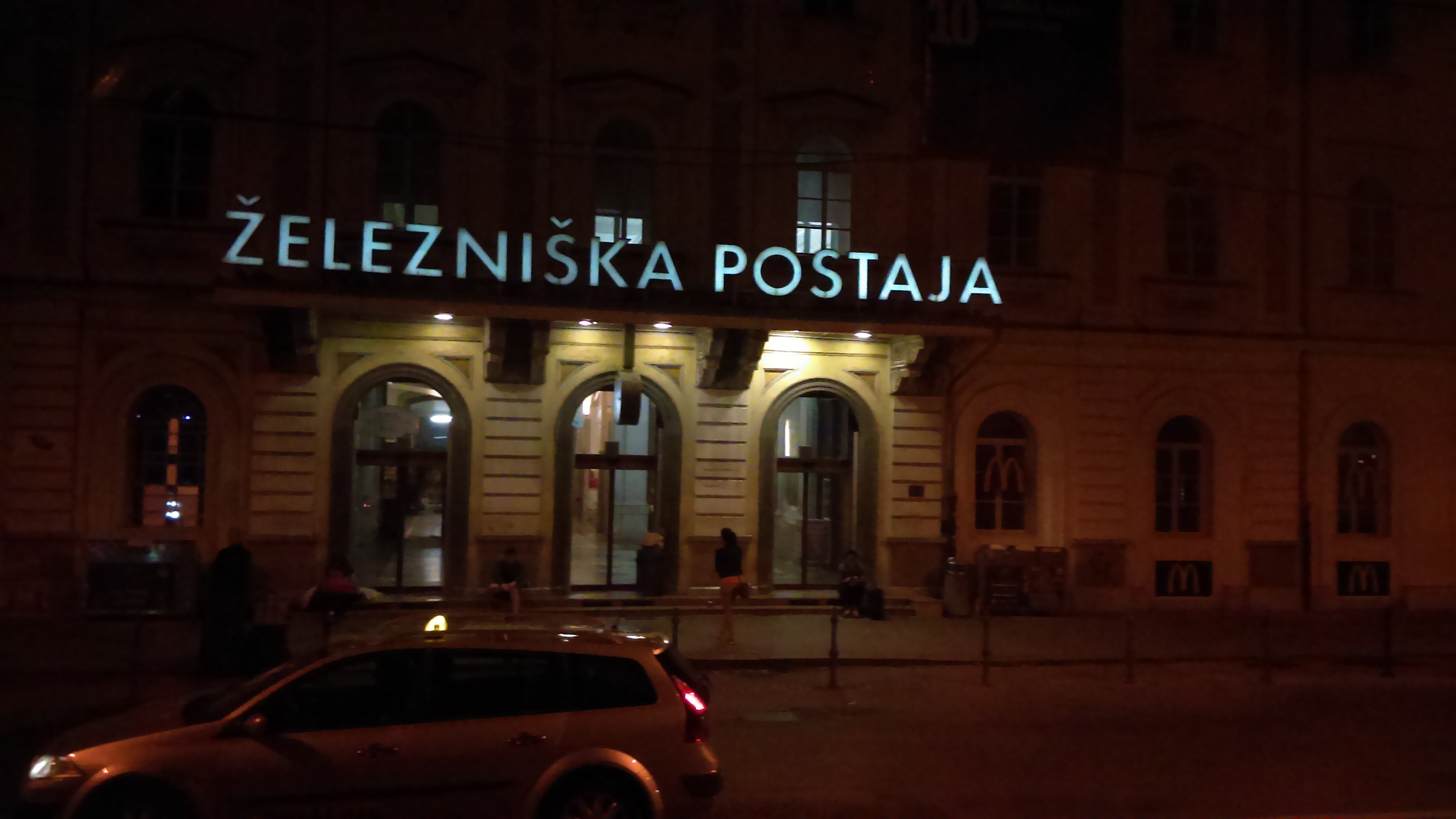
Night view

== Expansion starting from 2024 ==
In autumn 2024, the expansion and renovation of the station began. The railway junction is set to receive a renovated as well as an elongated underpass and newly arranged tracks with covered platforms. The project will cost the state and city around 167 million euros, with completion planned for 2026. The project is co-financed with European funds.

== Passenger Services ==
- Regional services (Treno regionale) Ljubljana – Sežana – Trieste
- EuroCity Emona: Vienna–Ljubljana and return
- Eurocity Vienna – Ljubljana – Trieste

== Services ==
- Ticket purchase
- Information
- Luggage lockers
- Lost and found
- Baggage Loading/Unloading
- Waiting room
- WC toilets
- Bar
- Giftshop
- Telephone
- Money exchange
- Mail box

== Mobility ==
- Staircase to the Railway platforms
- Elevator to the Railway platforms

== Transport services ==
- Bus station
- Taxi
- Parking (payment)
