= Veszprém County 2nd constituency =

Hungarian electoral district

Veszprém County 2nd constituency (Balatonfüred)
- Constituency for the National Assembly
- Location of Veszprém county 02 within Veszprém county

- Location of Veszprém county within Hungary
- County: Veszprém
- Electorate: 73,104 (2018)
- Major settlements: Balatonfüred

Current constituency
- Created: 2011
- Party: Tisza Party
- Member: Ágnes Forsthoffer
- Elected: 2026

The 2nd constituency of Veszprém County (Hungarian: Veszprém megyei 02. számú országgyűlési egyéni választókerület) is one of the single member constituencies of the National Assembly, the national legislature of Hungary. The constituency standard abbreviation: Veszprém 02. OEVK.

Since 2026, it has been represented by Ágnes Forsthoffer of the Tisza Party.

== Geography ==
The 2nd constituency is located in south-eastern part of Veszprém County.

=== List of municipalities ===
The constituency includes the following municipalities:

1. Alsóörs
2. Aszófő
3. Balatonakali
4. Balatonakarattya
5. Balatonalmádi
6. Balatoncsicsó
7. Balatonfőkajár
8. Balatonfüred
9. Balatonfűzfő
10. Balatonhenye
11. Balatonkenese
12. Balatonszepezd
13. Balatonszőlős
14. Balatonudvari
15. Barnag
16. Berhida
17. Csajág
18. Csopak
19. Dörgicse
20. Felsőörs
21. Hidegkút
22. Köveskál
23. Küngös
24. Litér
25. Lovas
26. Mencshely
27. Monoszló
28. Óbudavár
29. Örvényes
30. Ősi
31. Paloznak
32. Papkeszi
33. Pécsely
34. Pétfürdő
35. Szentantalfa
36. Szentjakabfa
37. Szentkirályszabadja
38. Tagyon
39. Tihany
40. Tótvázsony
41. Várpalota
42. Vászoly
43. Veszprémfajsz
44. Vöröstó
45. Zánka

== Members ==
The constituency was first represented by Károly Kontrát of the Fidesz from 2014, and he was re-elected in 2018. He did not run in the 2026 Hungarian parliamentary election and was succeeded by Ágnes Forsthoffer.

Election	Member	Party	%
2014	Károly Kontrát	Fidesz	
2018	Károly Kontrát	Fidesz	
2022	Károly Kontrát	Fidesz	51.0
2026	Ágnes Forsthoffer	TISZA	57.3
