= Balatonfüred District =

Balatonfüredi District Balatonfüredi járás
- District
- Coat of arms

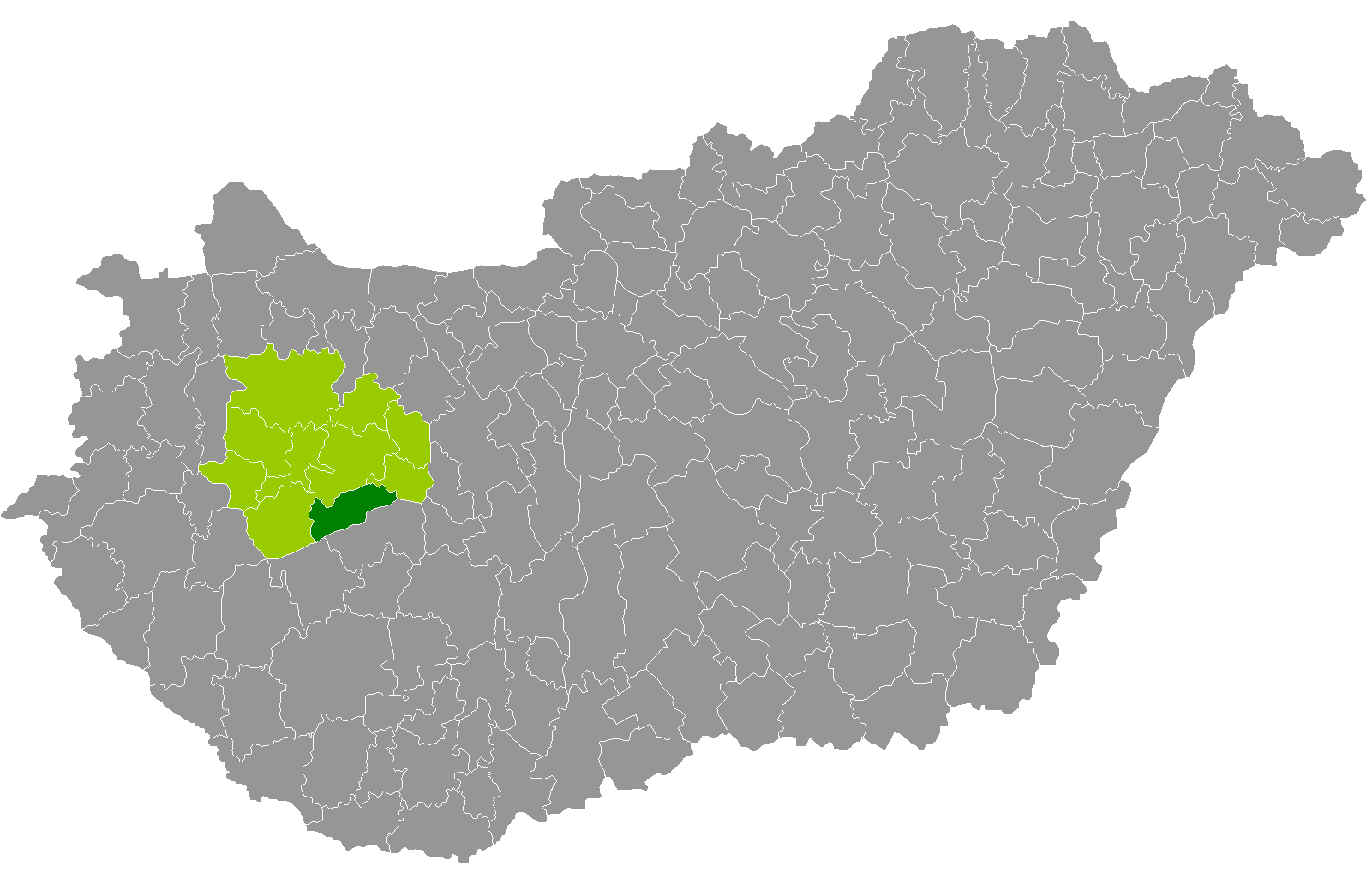
- Balatonfüredi District within Hungary and Veszprém County.
- Country: Hungary
- County: Veszprém
- District seat: Balatonfüred

Area
  - Total: 357.75 km^{2} (138.13 sq mi)
  - Rank: 5th in Veszprém

Population (2011 census)
  - Total: 23,849
  - Rank: 7th in Veszprém
  - Density: 67/km^{2} (170/sq mi)

Balatonfüred (Hungarian: Balatonfüredi járás) is a district in southern part of Veszprém County. Balatonfüred is also the name of the town where the district seat is found. The district is located in the Central Transdanubia Statistical Region.

== Geography ==
Balatonfüred District borders with Veszprém District to the north, Balatonalmádi District to the east, Siófok District and Fonyód District (Somogy County) to the south, Tapolca District to the west. The number of the inhabited places in Balatonfüred District is 22.

== Municipalities ==
As of 1 January 2013, the district consists of one town (bold) and 21 villages.

- Alsóörs (1,586)
- Aszófő (392)
- Balatonakali (644)
- Balatoncsicsó (214)
- Balatonfüred (13,313) – district seat
- Balatonszepezd (393)
- Balatonszőlős (625)
- Balatonudvari (310)
- Csopak (1,741)
- Dörgicse (254)
- Lovas (428)
- Monoszló (120)
- Óbudavár (53)
- Örvényes (158)
- Paloznak (441)
- Pécsely (526)
- Szentantalfa (433)
- Szentjakabfa (109)
- Tagyon (84)
- Tihany (1,358)
- Vászoly (247)
- Zánka (821)

== See also ==
- List of cities and towns in Hungary
