= Lake Balaton =

Freshwater lake in Hungary

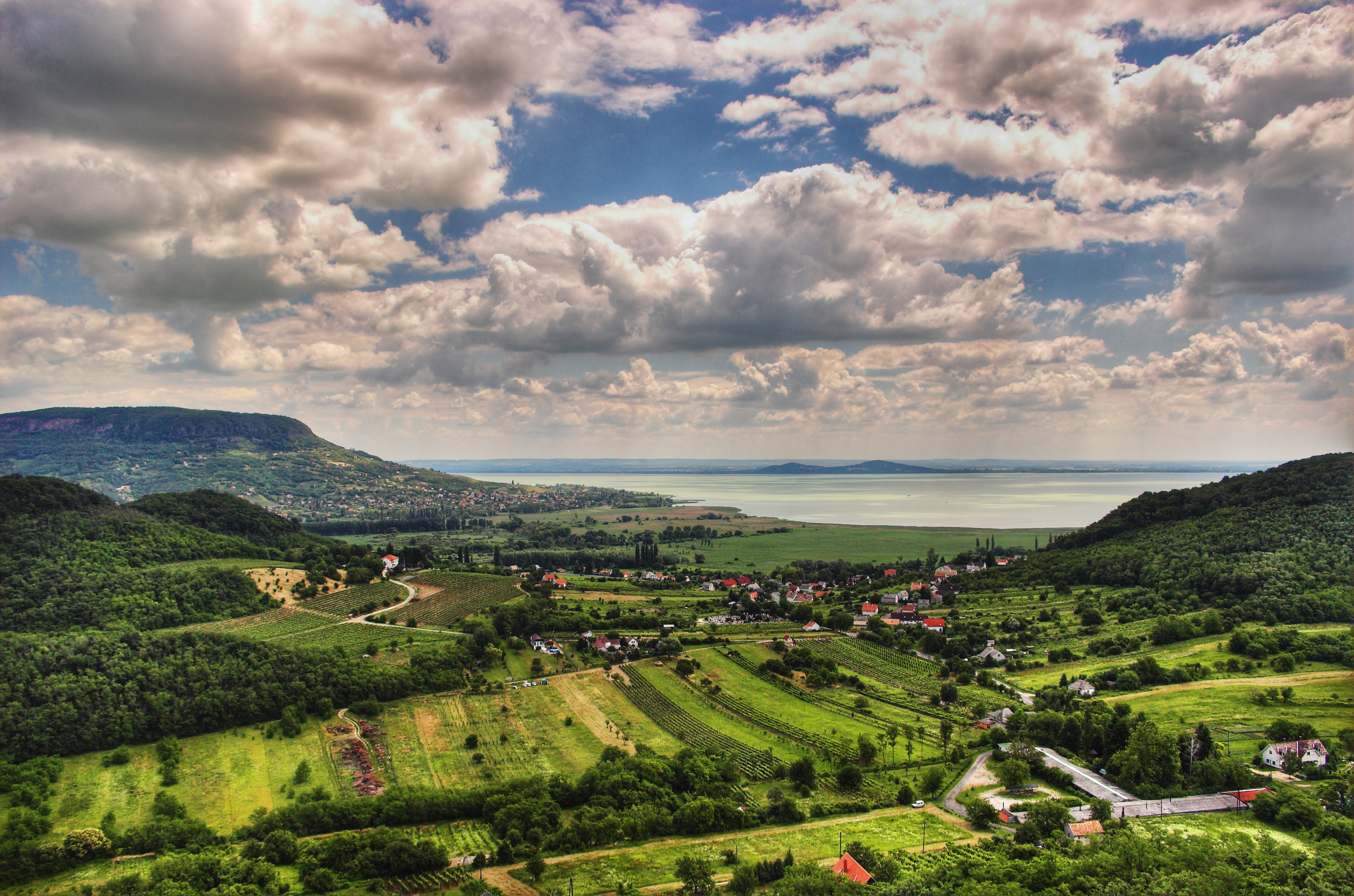
- Lake Balaton

- Location within Hungary

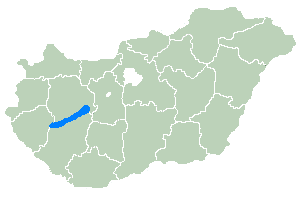
- Location of Lake Balaton within Hungary
- Location: Hungary
- Coordinates: 46°51′00″N 17°43′12″E
- Type: Rift lake
- Primary inflows: Zala River
- Primary outflows: Sió
- Catchment area: 5,174 km^{2} (1,998 sq mi)
- Basin countries: Hungary
- Max. length: 78 km (48 mi)
- Max. width: 14 km (8.7 mi)
- Surface area: 600 km^{2} (230 sq mi)
- Average depth: 3.3 m (11 ft)
- Max. depth: 12.2 m (40 ft)
- Water volume: 1.9 km^{3} (0.46 cu mi)
- Residence time: 2 years
- Shore length^{1}: 235 km (146 mi)
- Surface elevation: 104.8 m (344 ft)
- Settlements: Keszthely, Siófok, Balatonfüred (see list)

Ramsar Wetland
- Designated: 17 March 1989
- Reference no.: 421
- ^{1} Shore length is not a well-defined measure.

Lake Balaton (Hungarian: [ˈbɒlɒton]) is a freshwater rift lake in the Transdanubian region of Hungary. It is the largest lake in Central Europe, and one of the region's foremost tourist destinations. The Zala River provides the largest inflow of water to the lake, and the canalized Sió is the only outflow.

The mountainous region of the northern shore is known both for its historic character and as a major wine region, while the flat southern shore is known for its resort towns. Balatonfüred and Hévíz developed early as resorts for the wealthy, but it was not until the late 19th century when landowners, ruined by Phylloxera attacking their grape vines, began building summer homes to rent out to the burgeoning middle class.

== Name ==
In distinction to all other Hungarian endonyms for lakes, which universally bear the suffix -tó 'lake', Lake Balaton is referred to in Hungarian with a definite article; that is, a Balaton 'the Balaton'. It was called lacus Pelsodis or Pelso by the Romans. The name is Indo-European in origin, derived from Slavic *bolto (Czech bláto, Slovak blato, Polish błoto), meaning 'mud, swamp' (from earlier Proto-Slavic boltьno, cf. Slovene: Blatno jezero, Slovak: Blatenské jazero).

In January 846, the Slavic prince Pribina began to build a fortress as his seat of power and several churches in the region of Lake Balaton, in the territory of modern Zalavár surrounded by forests and swamps along the Zala River. His well-fortified castle and capital of the Lower Pannonian Principality became known as Blatnohrad or Moosburg (literally, 'Swamp Fortress'), and it served as a bulwark against both the Bulgarians and the Moravians.

The German name for the lake is Plattensee. It is unlikely it was given that name for being shallow because the adjective platt is a Greek loanword that was borrowed via French and entered general German vocabulary in the 17th century. It is also noteworthy that the average depth of Balaton (3.2 m or 10 ft) is not extraordinary for the area (cf. the average depth of the neighbouring Neusiedler See, which is roughly 1 m or 3.3 ft).

== Climate ==
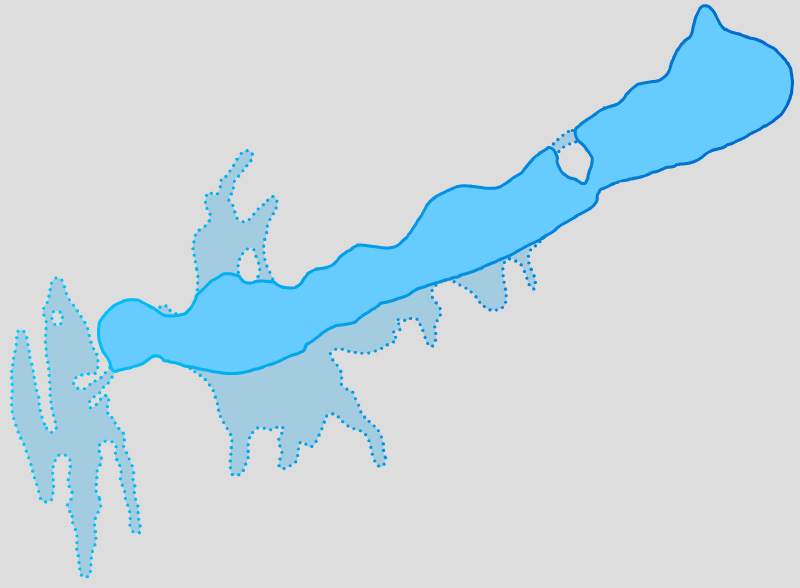
Map of Balaton in ancient times

Balaton seen from Sentinel-2 satellite

Lake Balaton affects precipitation in the local area. The area receives approximately 5–7 cm (2–3 in) more precipitation than most of Hungary, resulting in more cloudy days and less extreme temperatures. The lake freezes over during winters. The microclimate around Lake Balaton has also made the region ideal for viticulture. The Mediterranean-like climate, combined with the soil (containing volcanic rock), has made the region notable for its production of wines since the Roman period 2,000 years ago.

== History ==
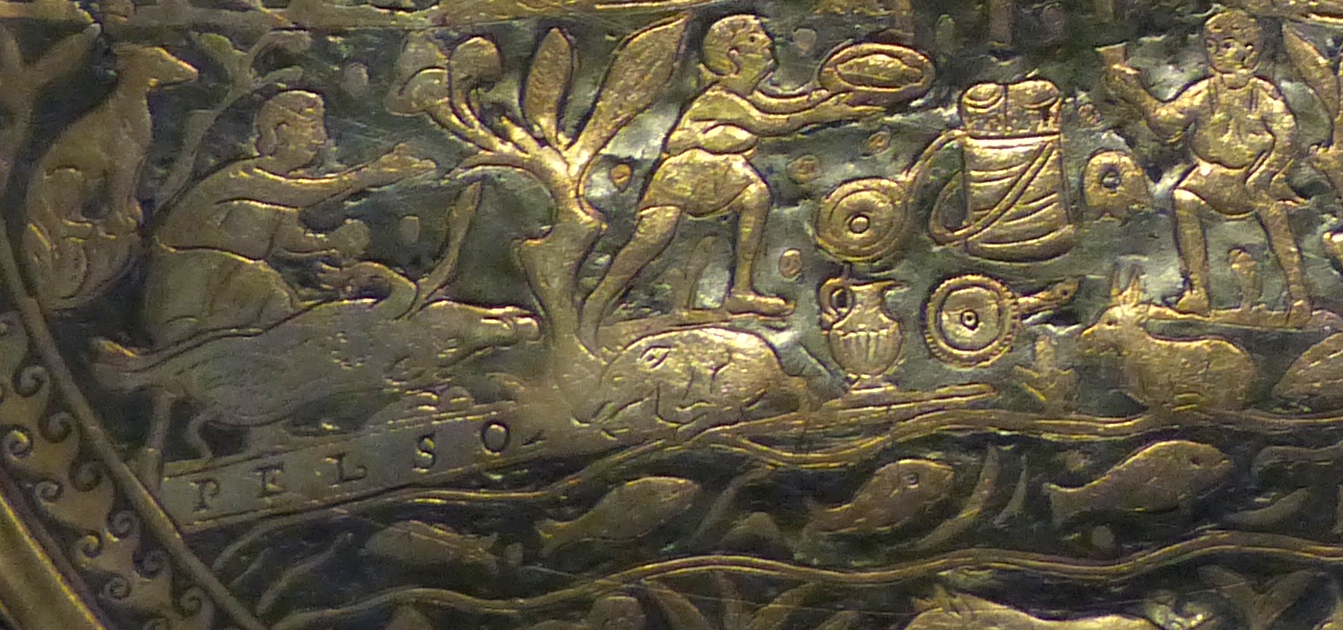
Detail of a silver plate from the Seuso Treasure with the inscription PELSO (i.e., 'Balaton')

It always has been an important location, both tactically and culturally (with many folk tales surrounding it). During the Ottoman wars played an important role in defending Royal Hungary where even battles were fought. While a few settlements on Lake Balaton, including Balatonfüred and Hévíz, have long been resort centres for the Hungarian aristocracy, it was only in the late 19th century that the Hungarian middle class began to visit the lake. The construction of railways in 1861 and 1909 increased tourism substantially, but the post-war boom of the 1950s was much larger.

By the turn of the 20th century, Balaton had become a center of research by Hungarian biologists, geologists, hydrologists, and other scientists, leading to the country's first biological research institute being built on its shore in 1927.

The last major German offensive of World War II, Operation Spring Awakening, was conducted in the region of Lake Balaton in March 1945, being referred to as "the Lake Balaton Offensive" in many British histories of the war. The battle was a German attack by Sepp Dietrich's Sixth Panzer Army and the Hungarian Third Army between 6 and 16 March 1945, and in the end, resulted in a Red Army victory. Several Ilyushin Il-2 wrecks have been pulled out of the lake after having been shot down during the later months of the war.

During the 1960s and 1970s, Balaton became a major tourist destination due to focused government efforts, causing the number of overnight guests in local hotels and campsites to increase from 700,000 in July 1965 to two million in July 1975. The number of weekend visitors to the region, including tens of thousands from Budapest, reached more than 600,000 by 1975. It was visited by ordinary working Hungarians, and especially for subsidised holiday excursions by National Council of Trade Union (Hungarian: SZOT: Szakszervezetek Országos Tanácsának) members to exclusive hotels and small resorts (Hungarian: üdülő ingatlan) for them. It also attracted many East Germans and other residents of the Eastern Bloc. West Germans could also visit, making Balaton a common meeting place for families and friends separated by the Berlin Wall until 1989.

== Tourism ==
The major resorts around the lake are Siófok, Keszthely, and Balatonfüred. Zamárdi, another resort town on the southern shore, has been the site of Balaton Sound, a notable electronic music festival since 2007. Balatonkenese has hosted numerous traditional gastronomic events. Siófok is known for attracting young people to it because of its large clubs. Keszthely is the site of the Festetics Palace and Balatonfüred is a historical bathing town which hosts the annual Anna Ball.

The peak tourist season extends from June until the end of August. The average water temperature during the summer is 25 °C (77 °F), which makes bathing and swimming popular on the lake. Most of the beaches consist of either grass, rocks, or the silty sand that also makes up most of the bottom of the lake. Many resorts have artificial sandy beaches and all beaches have step access to the water. Other tourist attractions include sailing, fishing, and other water sports, as well as visiting the countryside and hills, wineries on the north coast, and nightlife on the south shore. The Tihany Peninsula is a historical district. Badacsony is a volcanic mountain and wine-growing region as well as a lakeside resort. The lake is almost completely surrounded by separated bike lanes to facilitate bicycle tourism. Although the peak season at the lake is the summer, Balaton is also frequented during the winter, when visitors go ice-fishing or even skate, sledge, or ice-sail on the lake if it freezes over.

Sármellék International Airport provides air service to Balaton (although most service is only seasonal).

Other resort towns include Balatonalmádi, Balatonboglár, Balatonlelle, Fonyód, and Vonyarcvashegy.

=== Sport ===
The annual Lake Balaton Crossing swim takes place in July. The race starts at Révfülöp and finishes at Balatonboglár for a total distance of 5.2 kilometres.

== Towns and villages ==
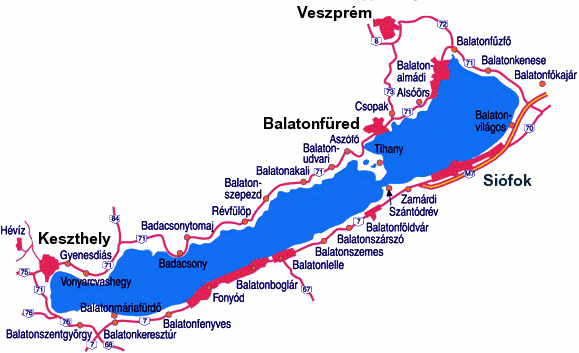
Towns and villages alongside Lake Balaton.

=== North shore ===
From east to west:

Balatonfőkajár - Balatonakarattya - Balatonkenese - Balatonfűzfő - Balatonalmádi - Alsóörs - Paloznak - Csopak - Balatonarács - Balatonfüred - Tihany - Aszófő - Örvényes - Balatonudvari - Fövenyes - Balatonakali - Zánka - Balatonszepezd - Szepezdfürdő - Révfülöp - Pálköve - Ábrahámhegy - Balatonrendes - Badacsonytomaj - Badacsony - Badacsonytördemic - Szigliget - Balatonederics - Balatongyörök - Vonyarcvashegy - Gyenesdiás - Keszthely

=== South shore ===
From east to west:

Balatonakarattya - Balatonaliga - Balatonvilágos - Sóstó - Szabadifürdő - Siófok - Széplak - Zamárdi - Szántód - Balatonföldvár - Balatonszárszó - Balatonszemes - Balatonlelle - Balatonboglár - Fonyód - Fonyód–Alsóbélatelep - Bélatelep - Balatonfenyves - Balatonmáriafürdő - Balatonkeresztúr - Balatonberény - Fenékpuszta

== Gallery ==
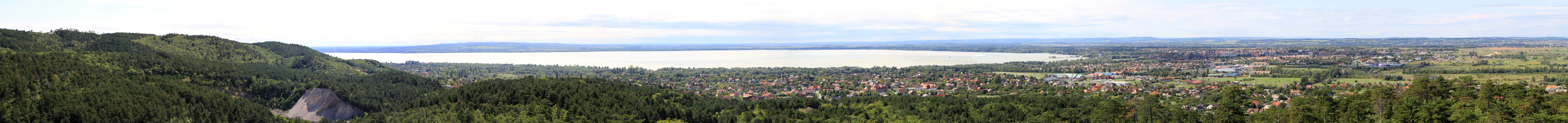
Panorama from Balaton and Keszthely
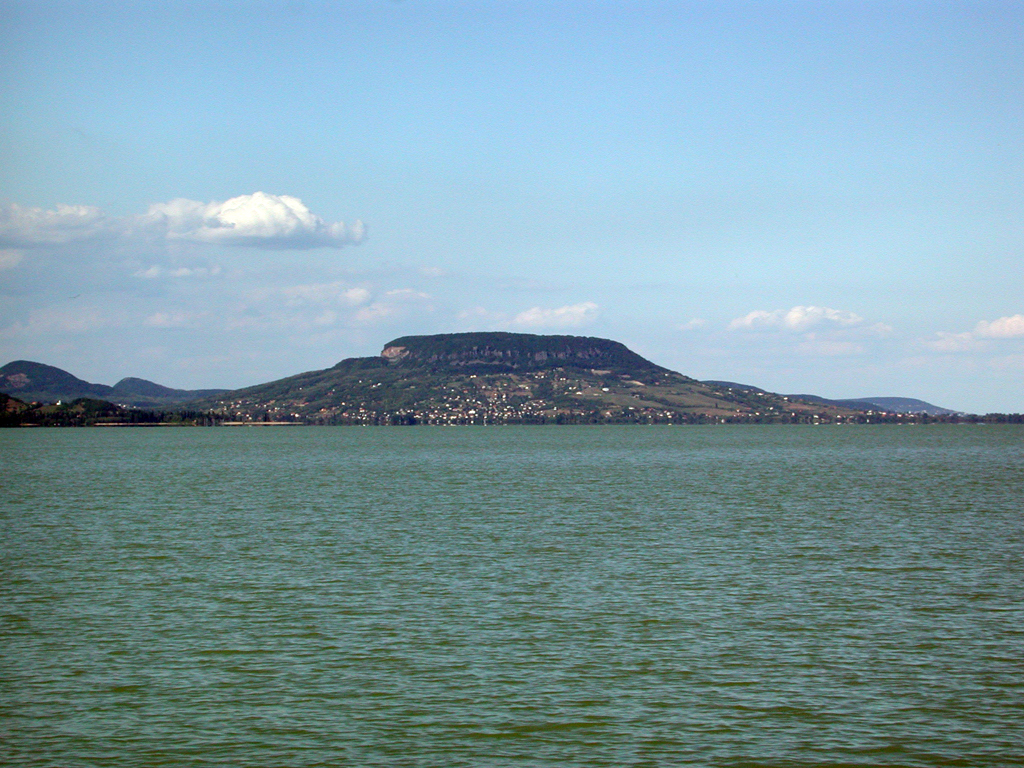
Badacsony

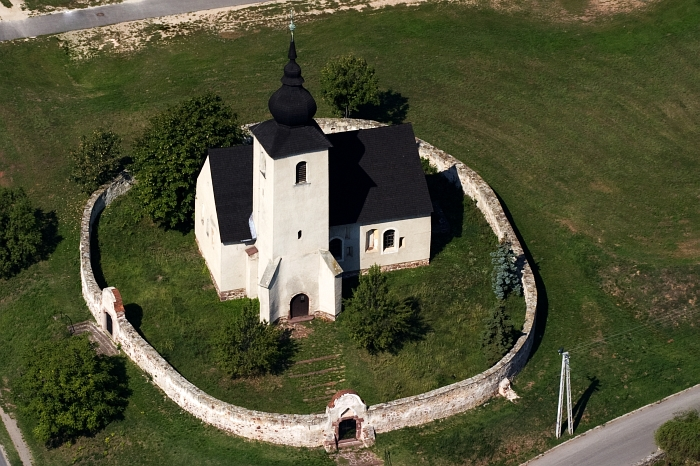
Balatonalmádi

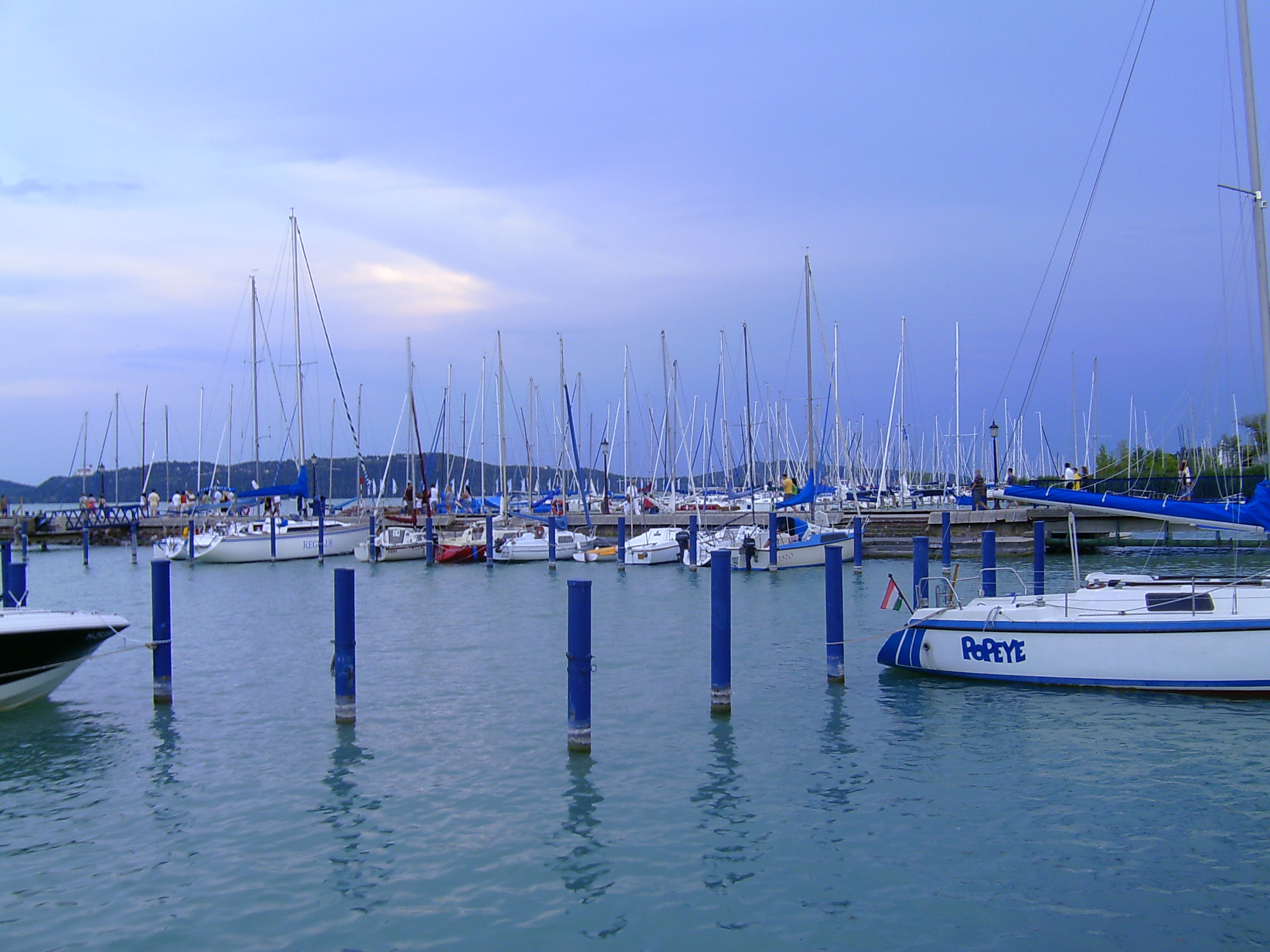
Balatonfüred

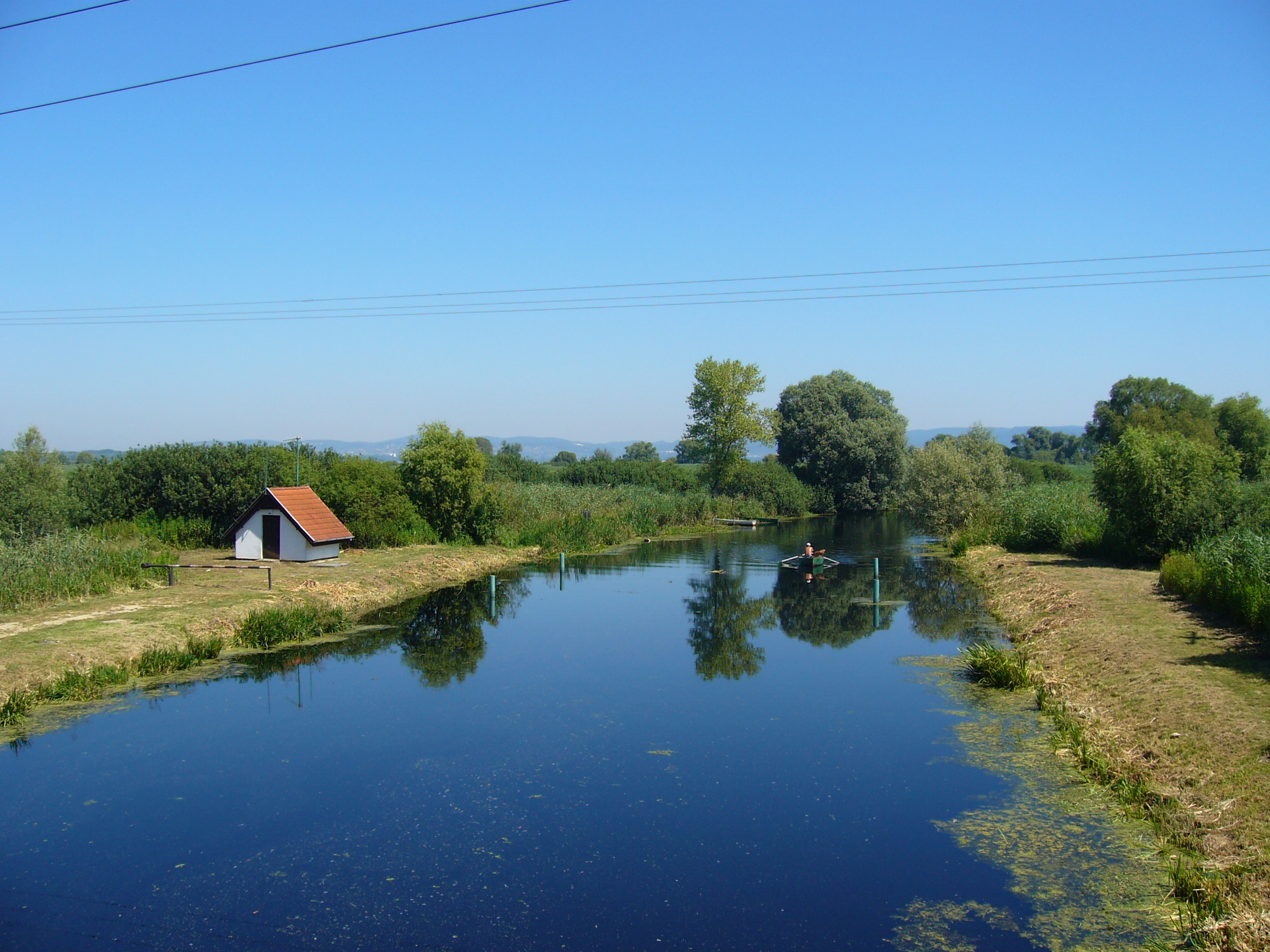
The estuary of Zala river

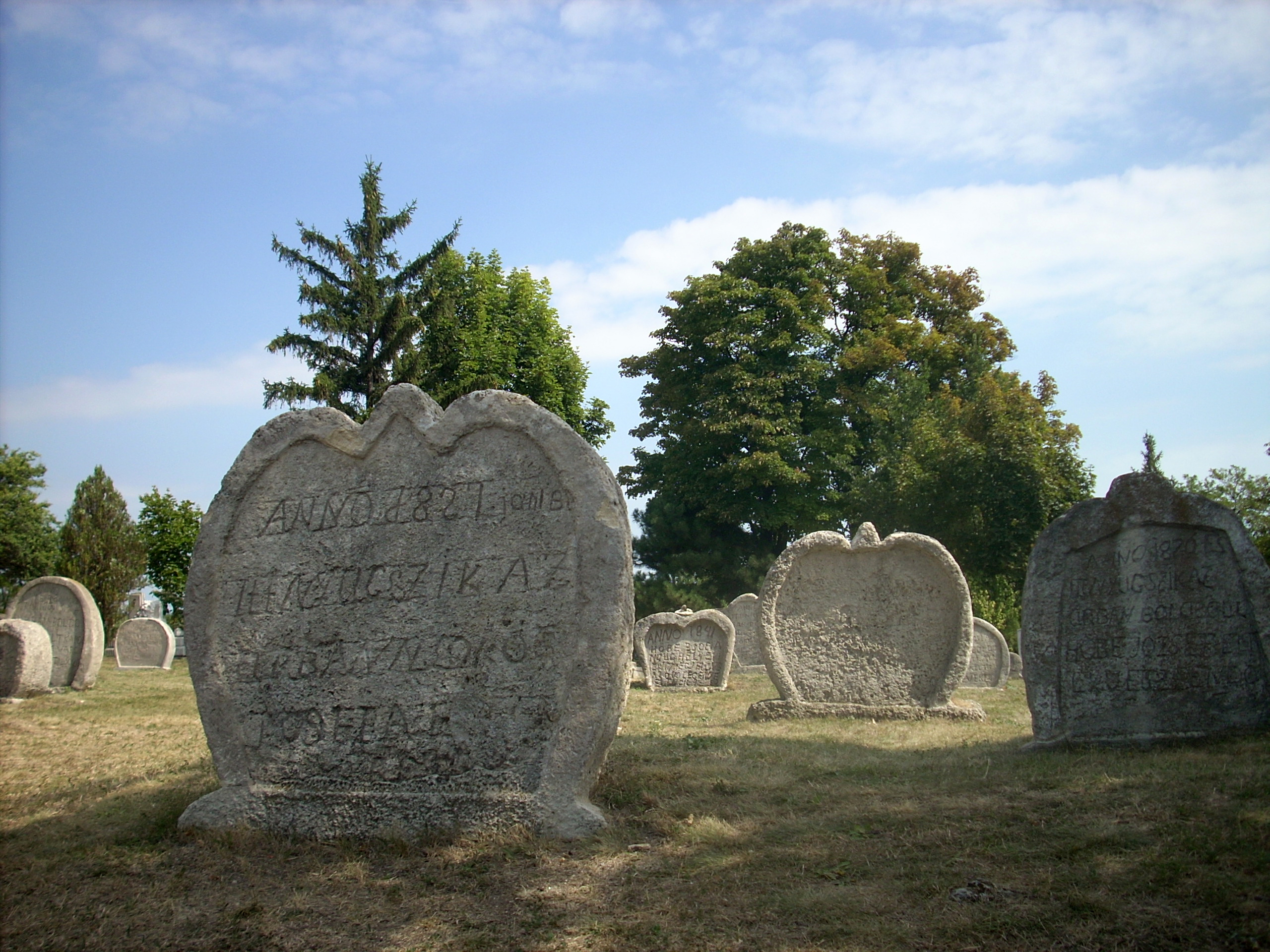
Balatonudvari

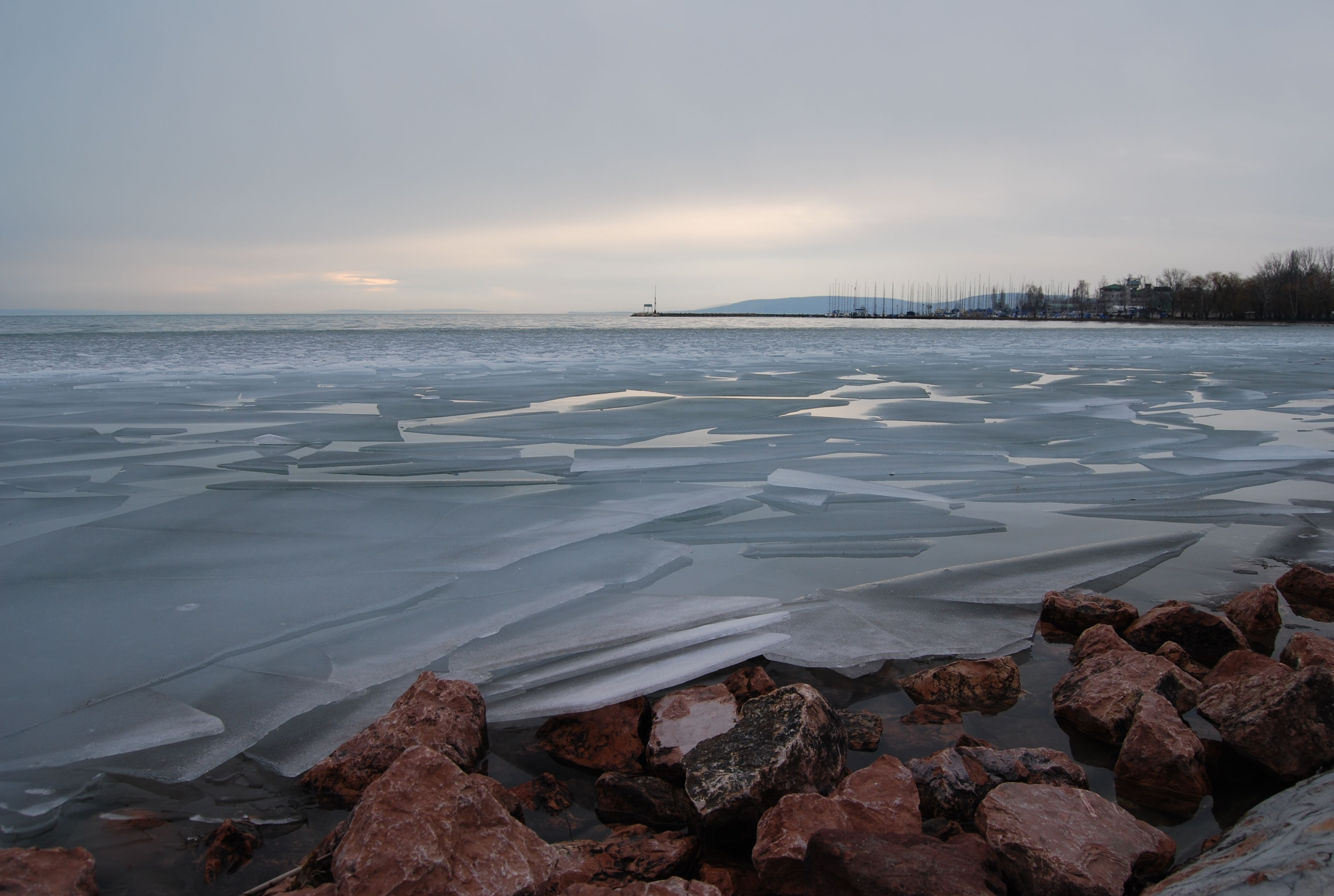
Balaton in Winter

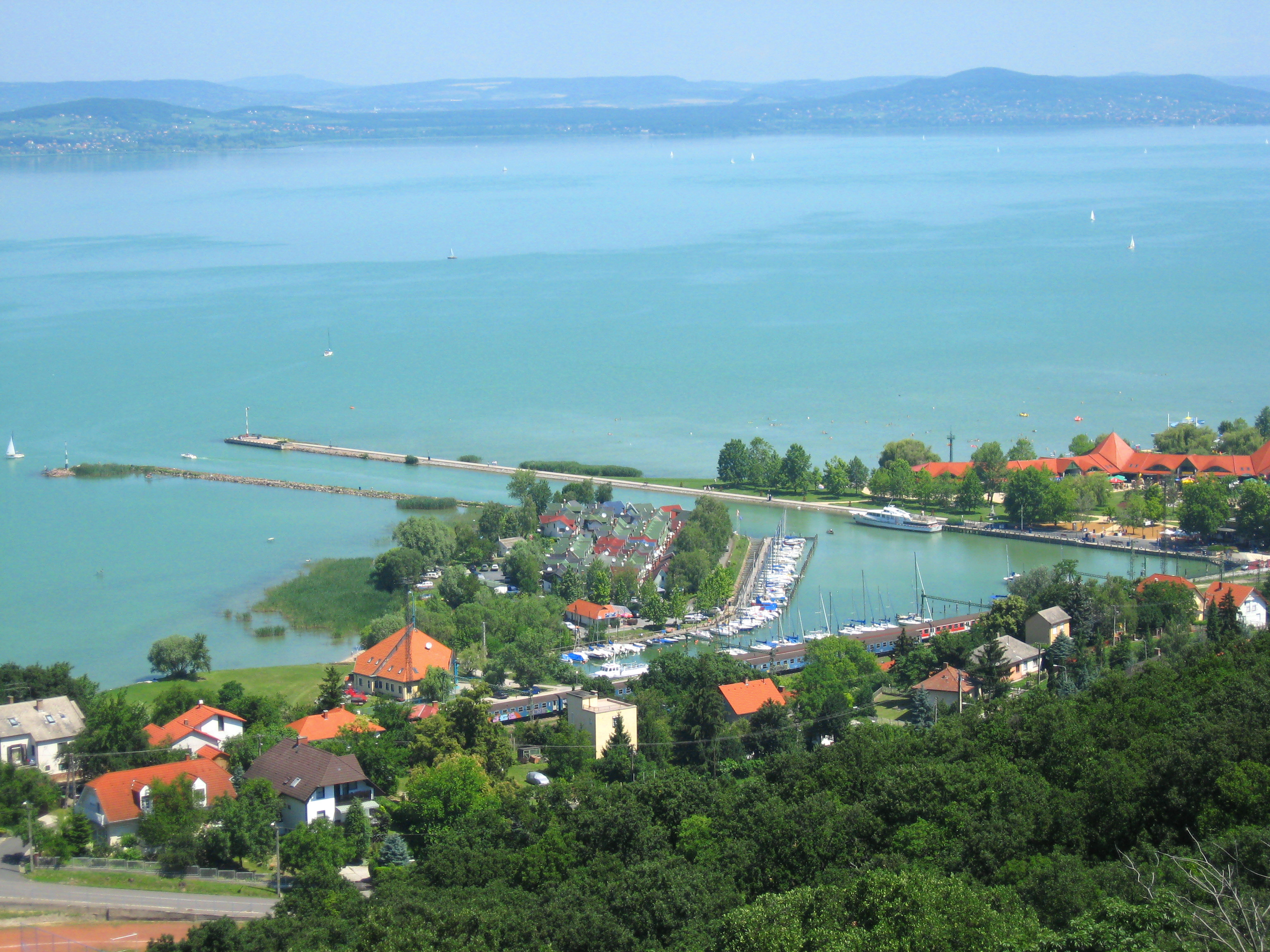
Fonyód

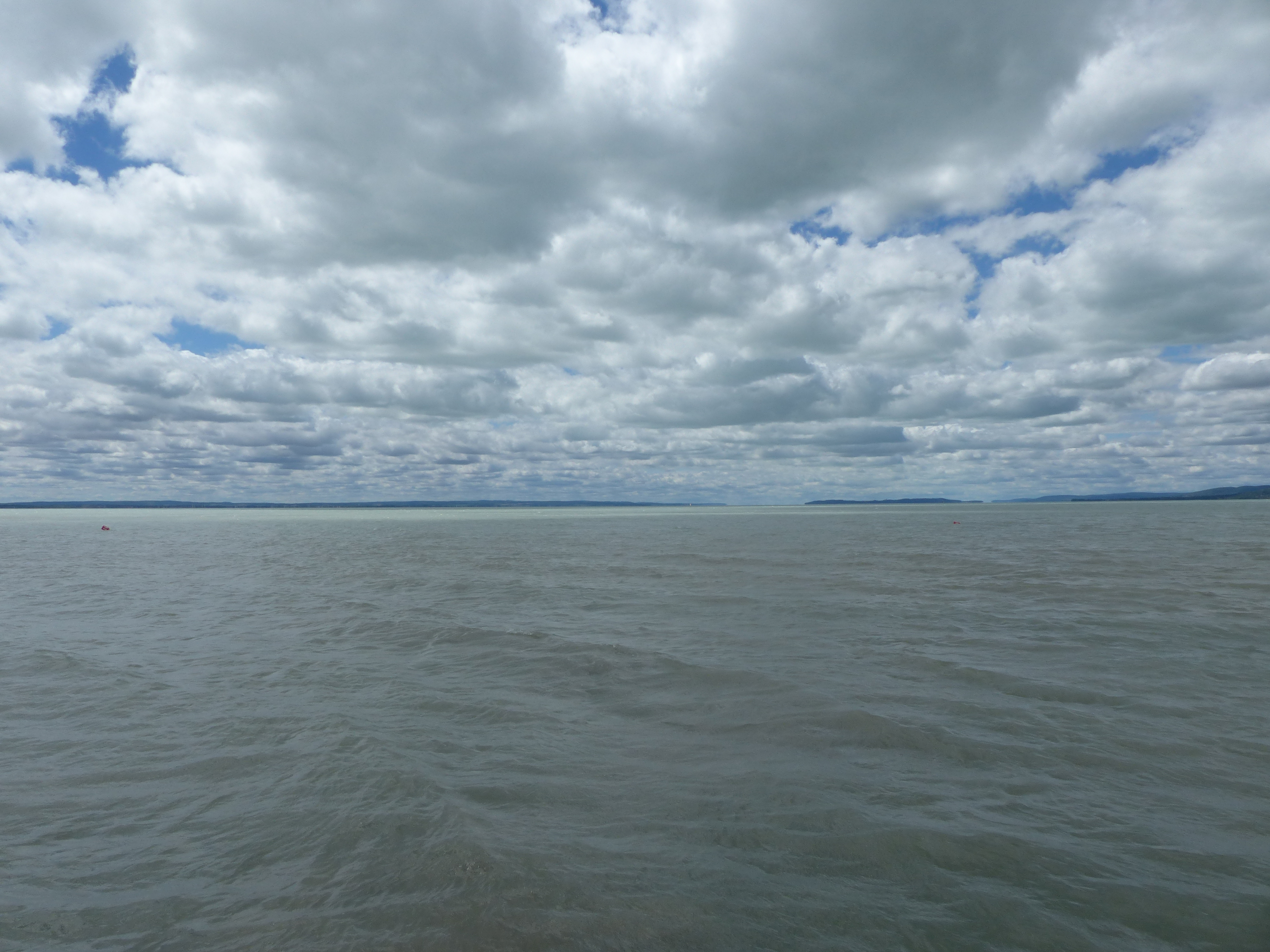
Balaton as seen from Alsórét, Balatonkenese

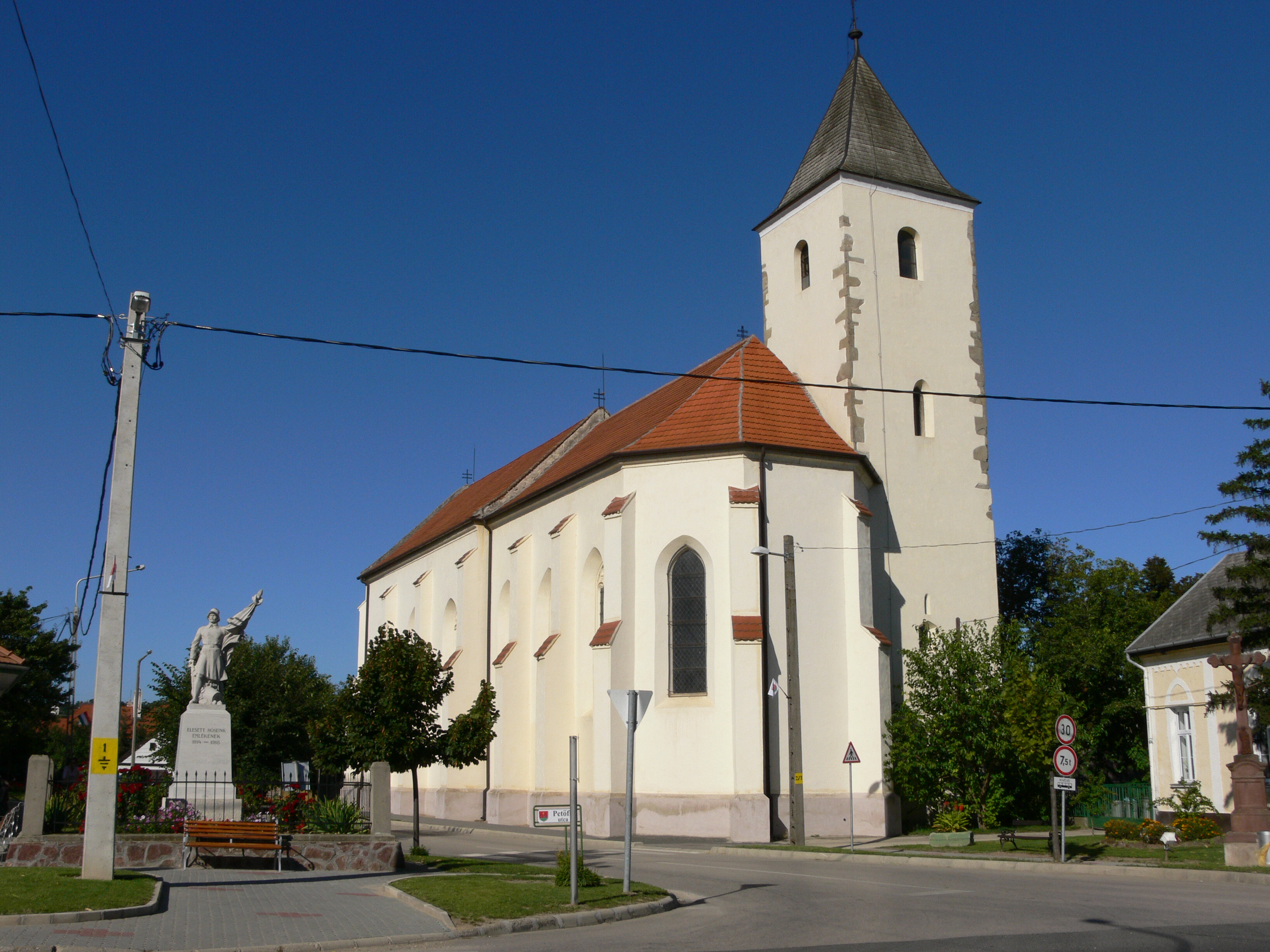
Kőröshegy

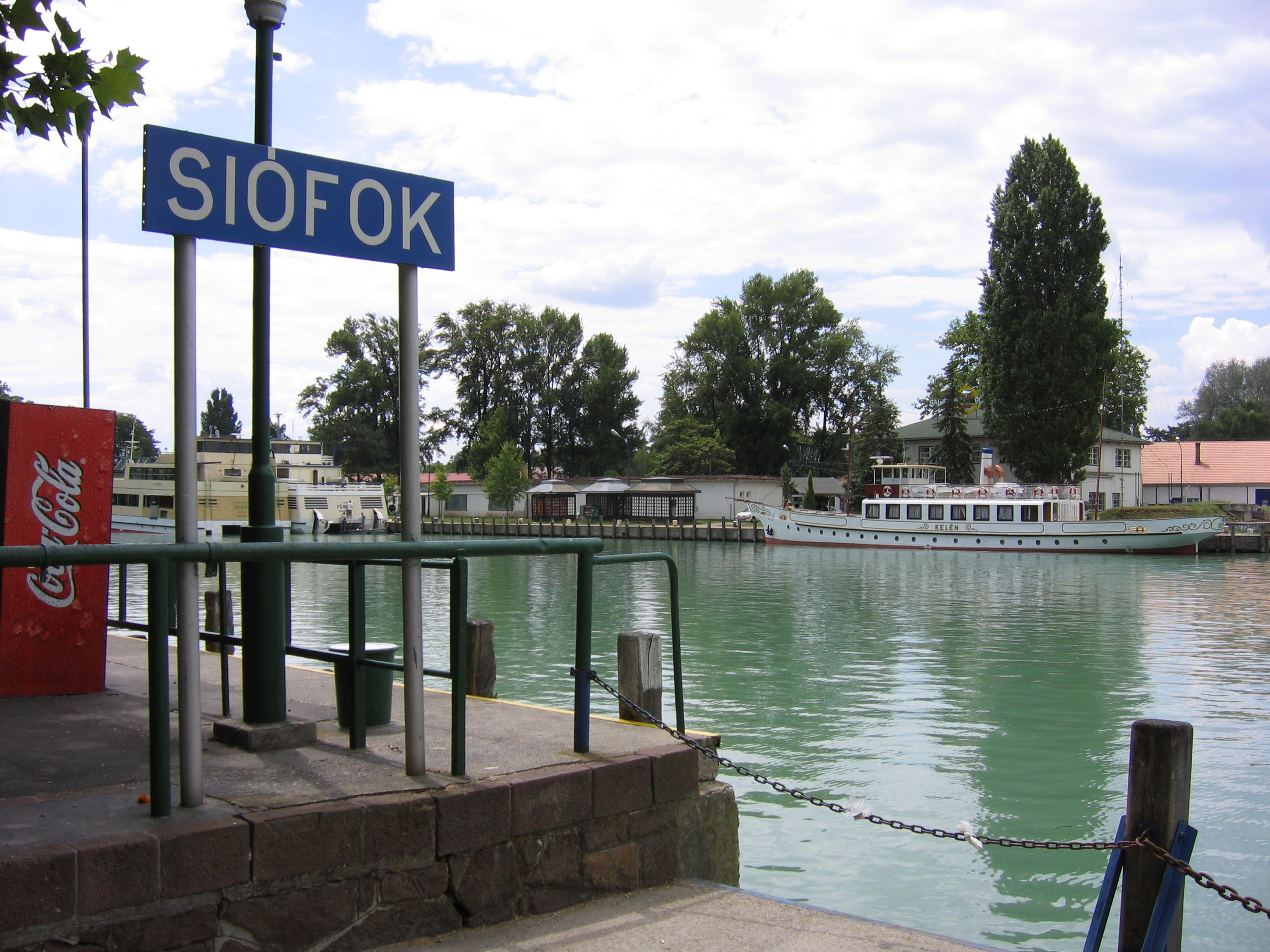
Siófok

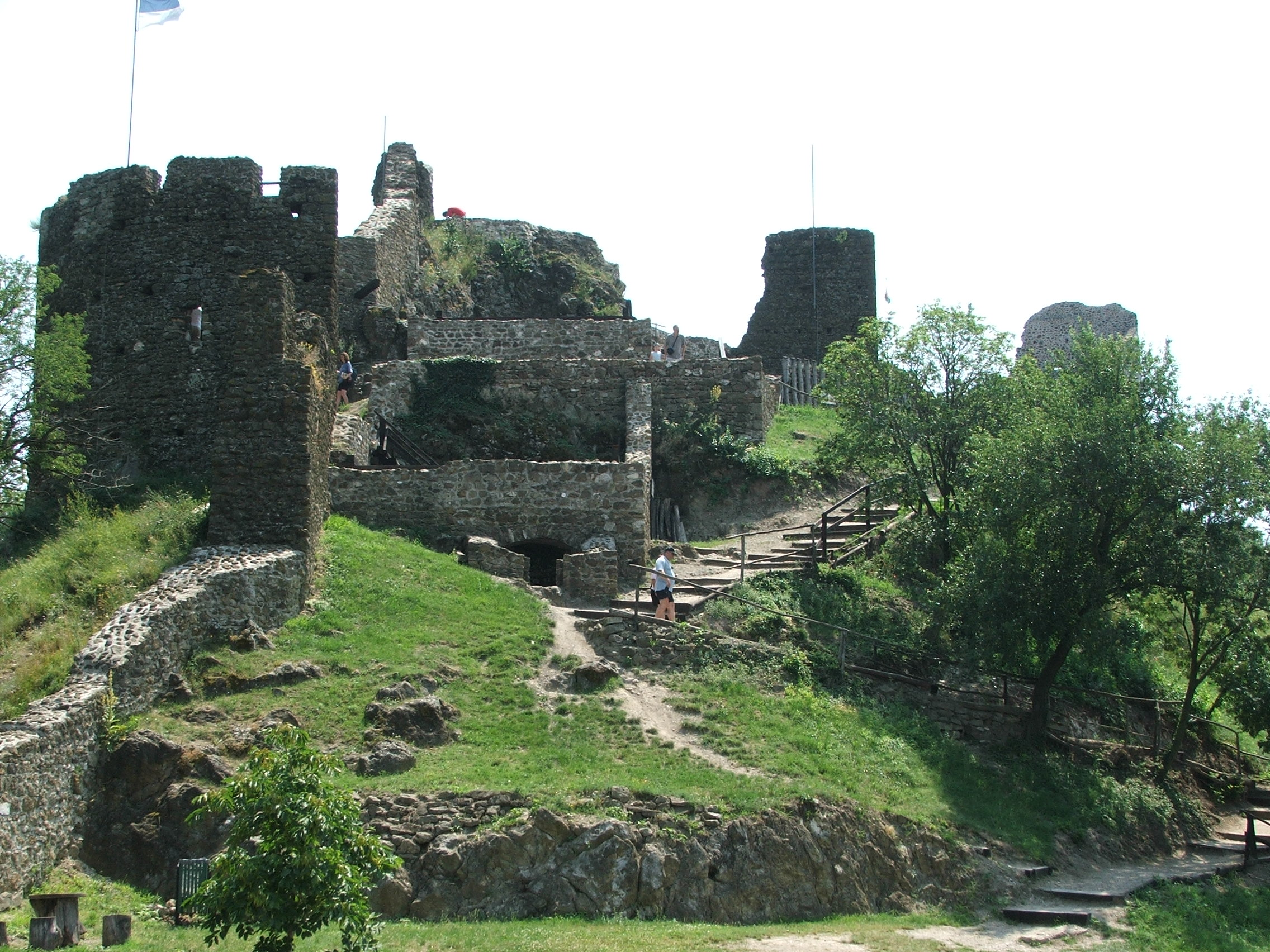
Castle at Szigliget

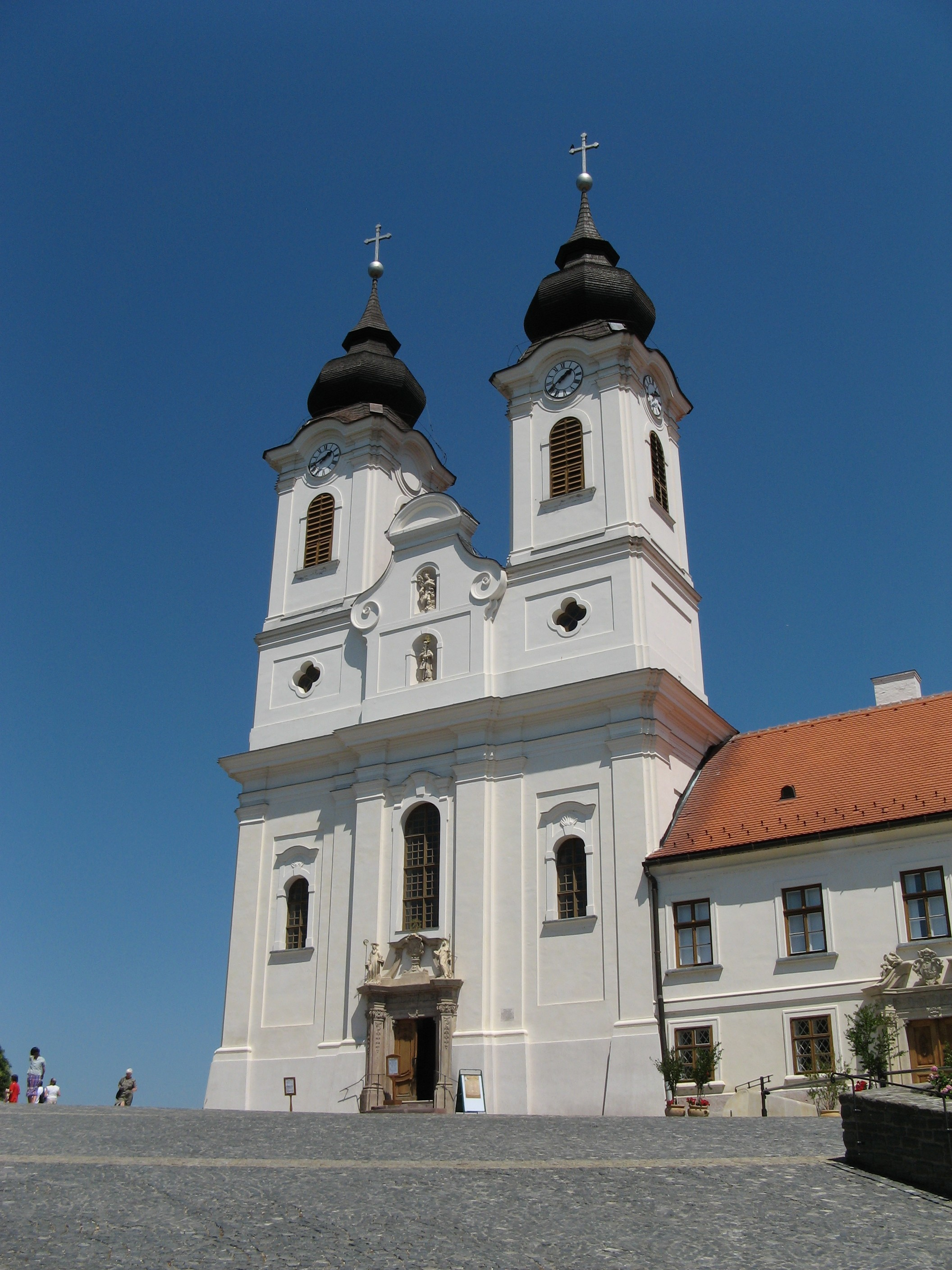
Tihany

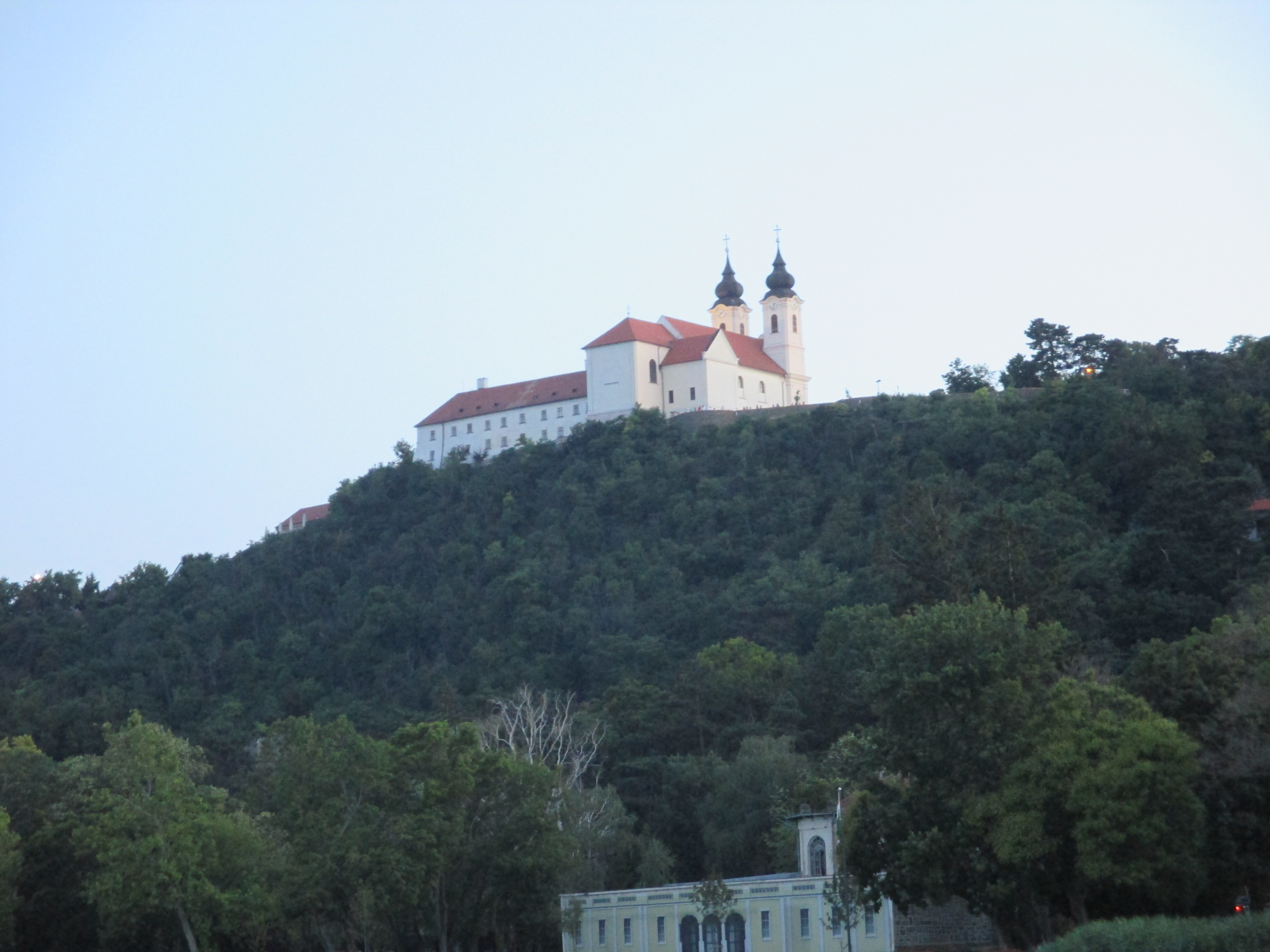
Benedictine Abbey on Tihany Peninsula

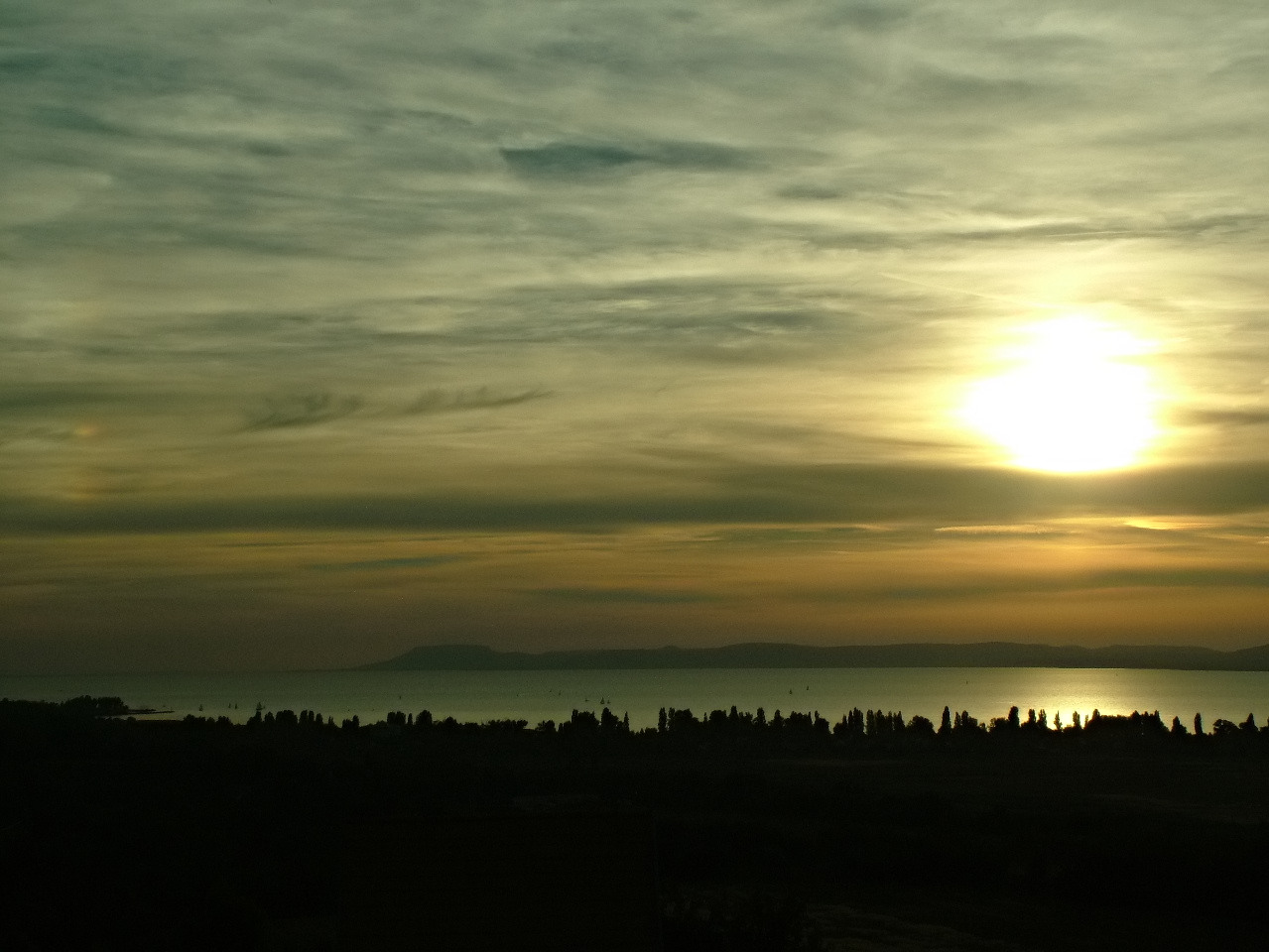
Zamárdi

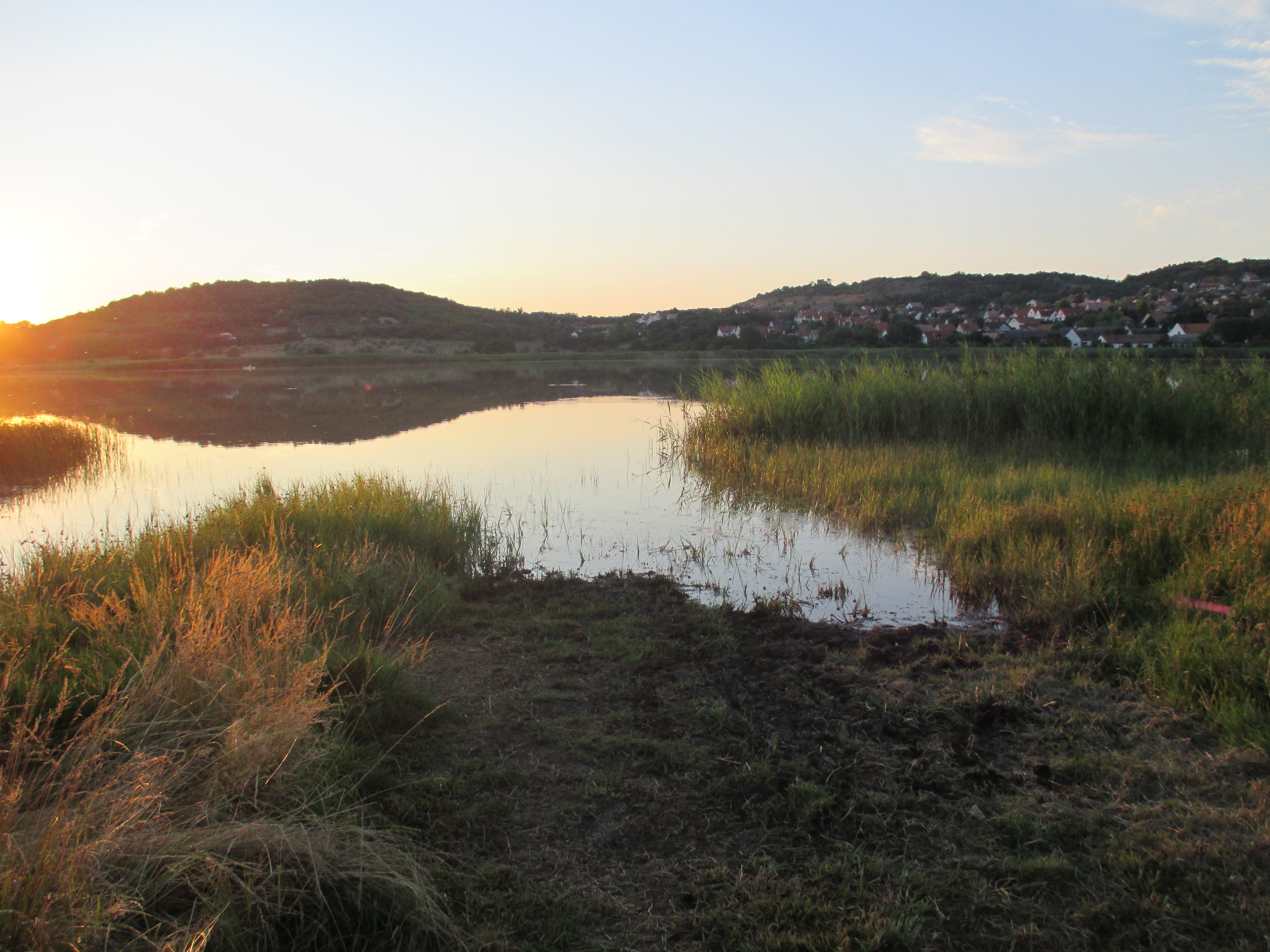
On Tihany Peninsula

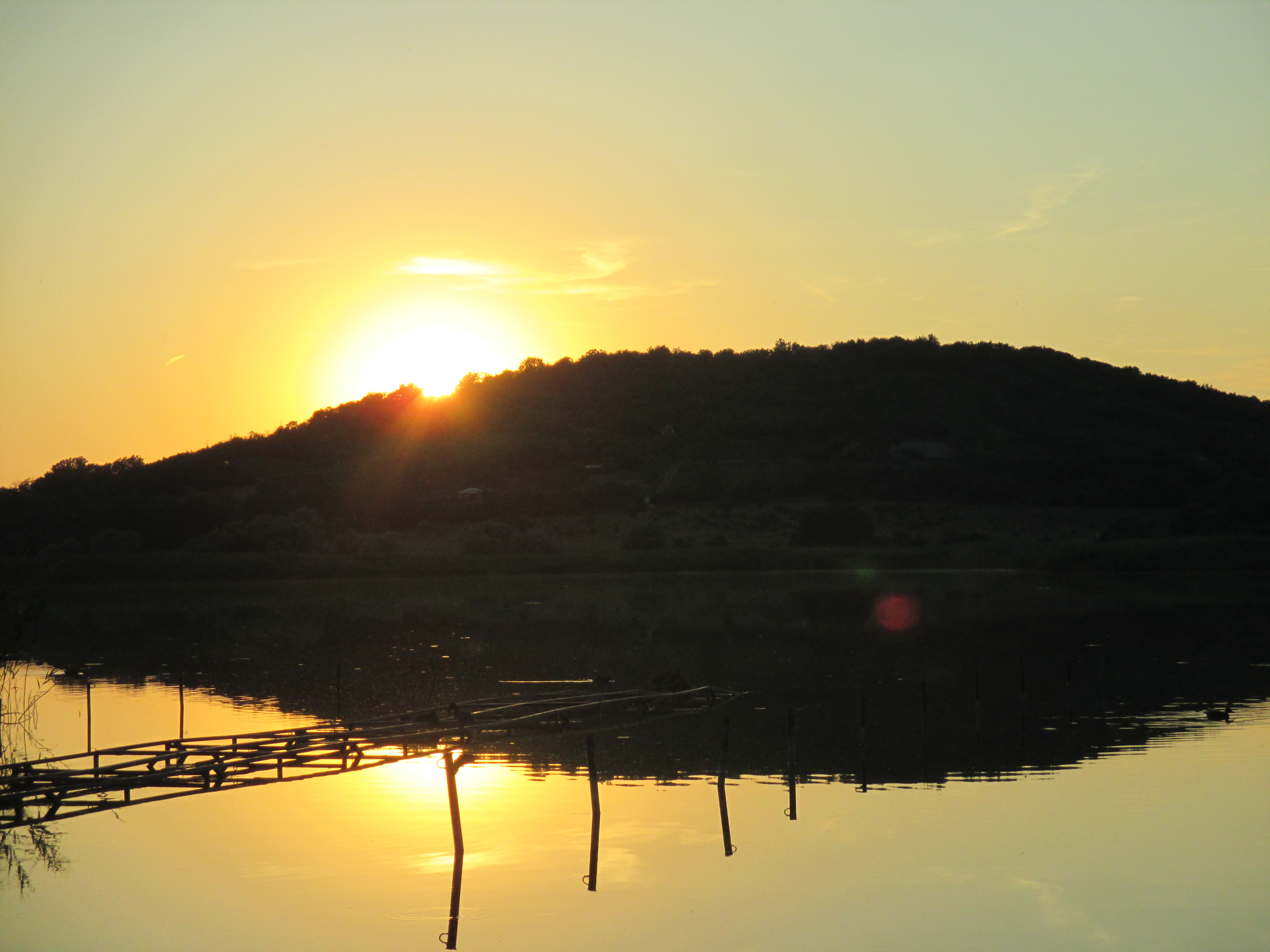
Sunset at the lake

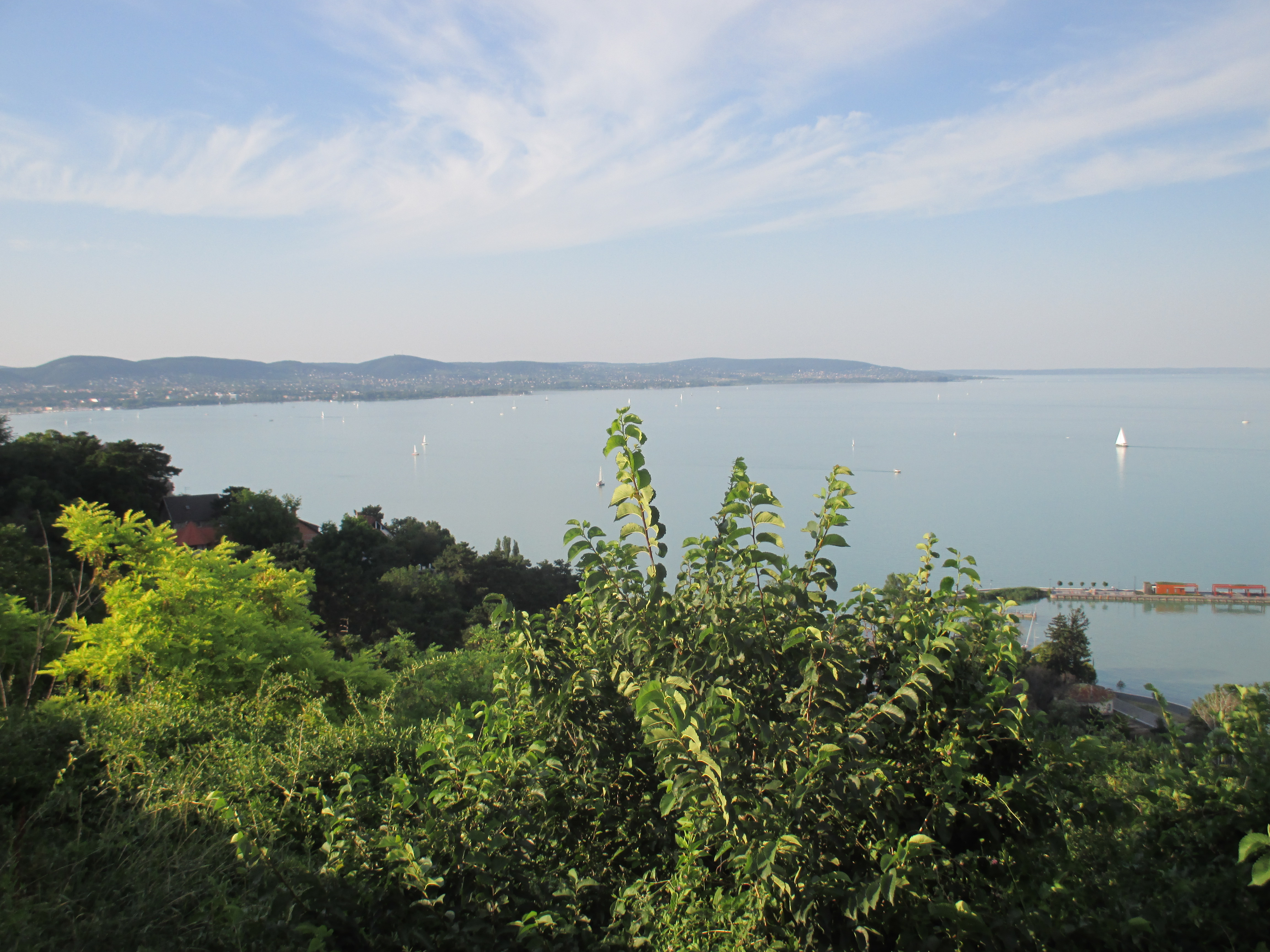
A view of the lake

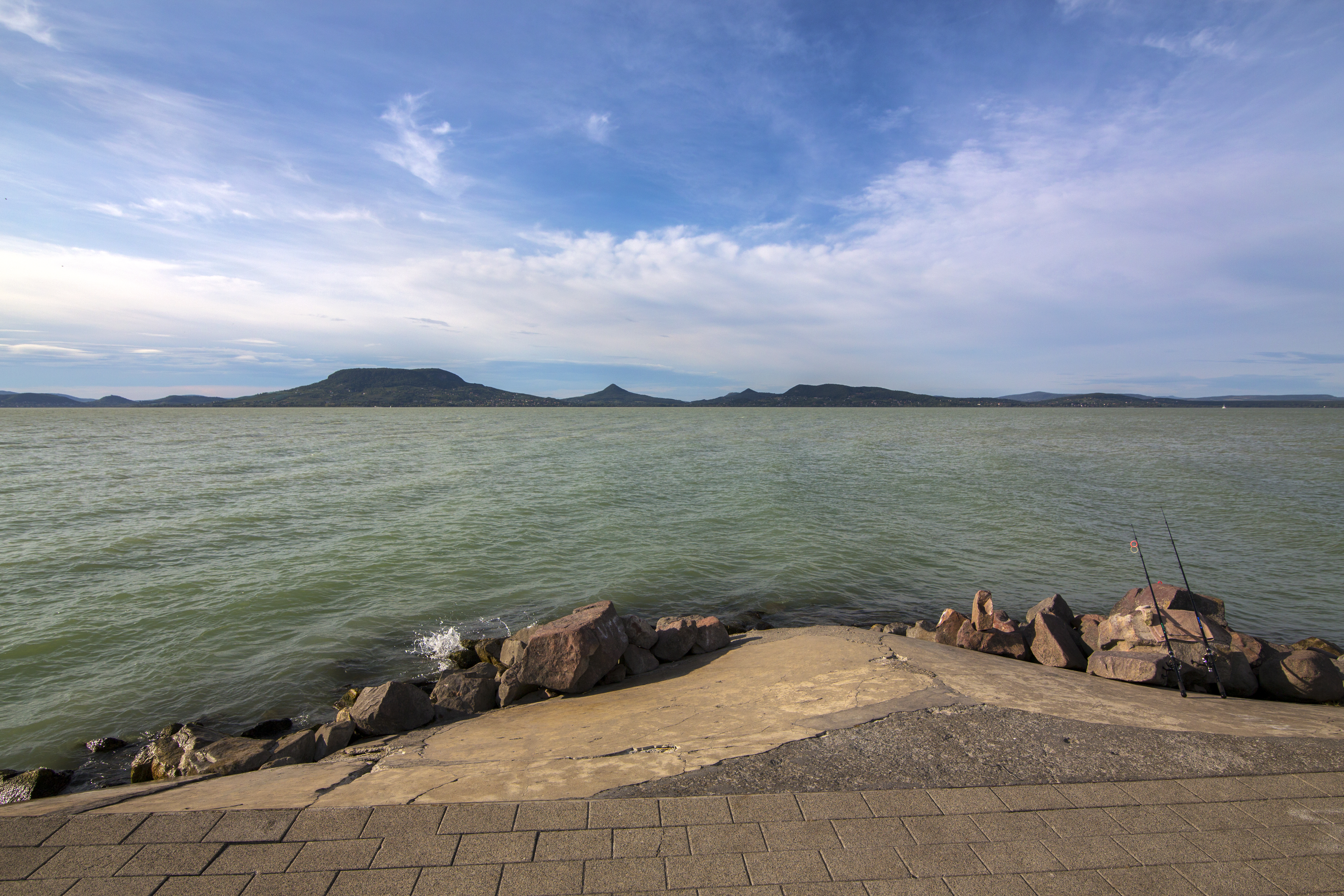
View to lake Balaton from the Fonyod city

== See also ==
- Balaton Principality
- Balaton Uplands National Park
- Geography of Hungary
