= Bontino =

Bontino EMC

Overview
- Production: 2009-
- Assembly: Weiz, Austria
- Designer: Brixxon Elektromos Auto Kft.

Body and chassis
- Class: Compact pickup

Powertrain
- Engine: electric

Bontino was a fully-electric compact car concept developed by Brixxon Elektromos Auto of Hungary and assembled in Austria.

The company planned to start production in February 2009 and as of December 2008 has received around 20,000 advance orders, mainly from Germany and Austria.

Weiz, a small town 65 kilometers from the Hungarian border, had agreed to pay up to 40 per cent of the rental costs and pay further incentives if the company uses Austrian labor. Negotiations to build the Bontino car in Szentgotthárd, Hungary, failed. Almost all components of the car are produced by Hungarian firms including Carbon Composite Kft of Pécsely and Hirschler Glas Kft of Sopron.

The company planned to sell the Bontinos primarily in Austria, Germany and Spain for between €5,900 and €7,300. Brixxon also hoped to later build photovoltaic, solar-powered battery stations.
