= Károly Kontrát =

Hungarian politician

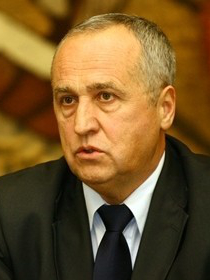

Member of the National Assembly
- In office 15 May 2002 – 8 May 2026
- Succeeded by: Ágnes Forsthoffer
- Constituency: Veszprém County 2nd

Personal details
- Born: 12 April 1956 (age 70) Pápa, Hungary
- Party: Fidesz
- Children: 3
- Profession: jurist, politician

Károly Kontrát (born 12 April 1956) is a Hungarian politician who served as Secretary of State of the Ministry of Interior from 14 July 1998 to 26 May 2002, and from 2 June 2010 to 24 May 2022, both times under minister Sándor Pintér. He was also a member of the National Assembly (MP) from 2002 to 2026.

Kontrát represented Veszprém County 2nd constituency from 2014 to 2026. He did not run in the 2026 Hungarian parliamentary election.

== Personal life ==
He is married and has three children.
