= Balatonrendes =

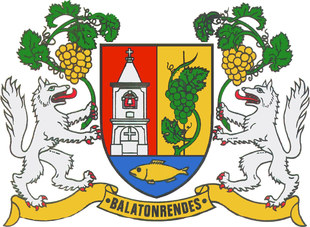
- Coat of arms

- Location of Veszprém county in Hungary subdivision_type1=County

- Location of Balatonrendes
- Coordinates: 46.82580°N 17.59441°E
- Country: Hungary

Area
  - Total: 6.76 km^{2} (2.61 sq mi)

Population (2004)
  - Total: 139
  - Density: 20.56/km^{2} (53.3/sq mi)
- Time zone: UTC+1 (CET)
  - Summer (DST): UTC+2 (CEST)
- Postal code: 8255
- Area code: 87

Balatonrendes (Hungarian pronunciation: [ˈbɒlɒtonrɛndɛʃ]) is a village in Veszprém county, Hungary. It is one of the least populated locales on the northern shore of Lake Balaton, having lost much of its population over the course of the 20th century due to urbanization. One of the last permanent sources of work in the village, a local quarry, closed in the latter part of the 1900s. As with almost all townships near the Balaton, in the summer months it attracts vacationers, but due to its distance from the lake shore proper and its more elusive location, traffic is lower than average. Significant viticulture, due to the proximity of the Badacsony wine region, is present. Notably, its main street has been renovated and stands as a picturesque remnant of old-style rural Hungarian architecture. The etymology of the village's name comes from the combination of Balaton with the suffix -rendes, which translates to "orderly" or "normal".
