= Balatonudvari =

- Location of Veszprém county in Hungary

- Location of Balatonudvari
- Coordinates: 46.90079°N 17.79904°E
- Country: Hungary
- County: Veszprém

Area
  - Total: 18.8 km^{2} (7.3 sq mi)

Population (2017)
  - Total: 293
  - Density: 15.6/km^{2} (40.4/sq mi)
- Time zone: UTC+1 (CET)
  - Summer (DST): UTC+2 (CEST)
- Postal code: 8242
- Area code: 87

Balatonudvari is a village in Veszprém county.

== Location ==
Balatonudvari is situated by the shore of Lake Balaton, between Örvényes and Balatonakali, to the west of the Tihany Peninsula.

== History ==
After the founding of the state, it was the property of the Hungarian kings, but in a record from 1164, it is referred to as the possession of the Atyuz Clan. In 1211, the Tihany Abbey had 6 households here. Properties were donated to the episcopate and chapter of Veszprém and to the Carthusian Monastery of Lövöld as well. Though the village had been ruined several times during the 150 years of Turkish rule, it was still an inhabited place with some 15 years of interruptions throughout all this time.

== Tourist sights ==
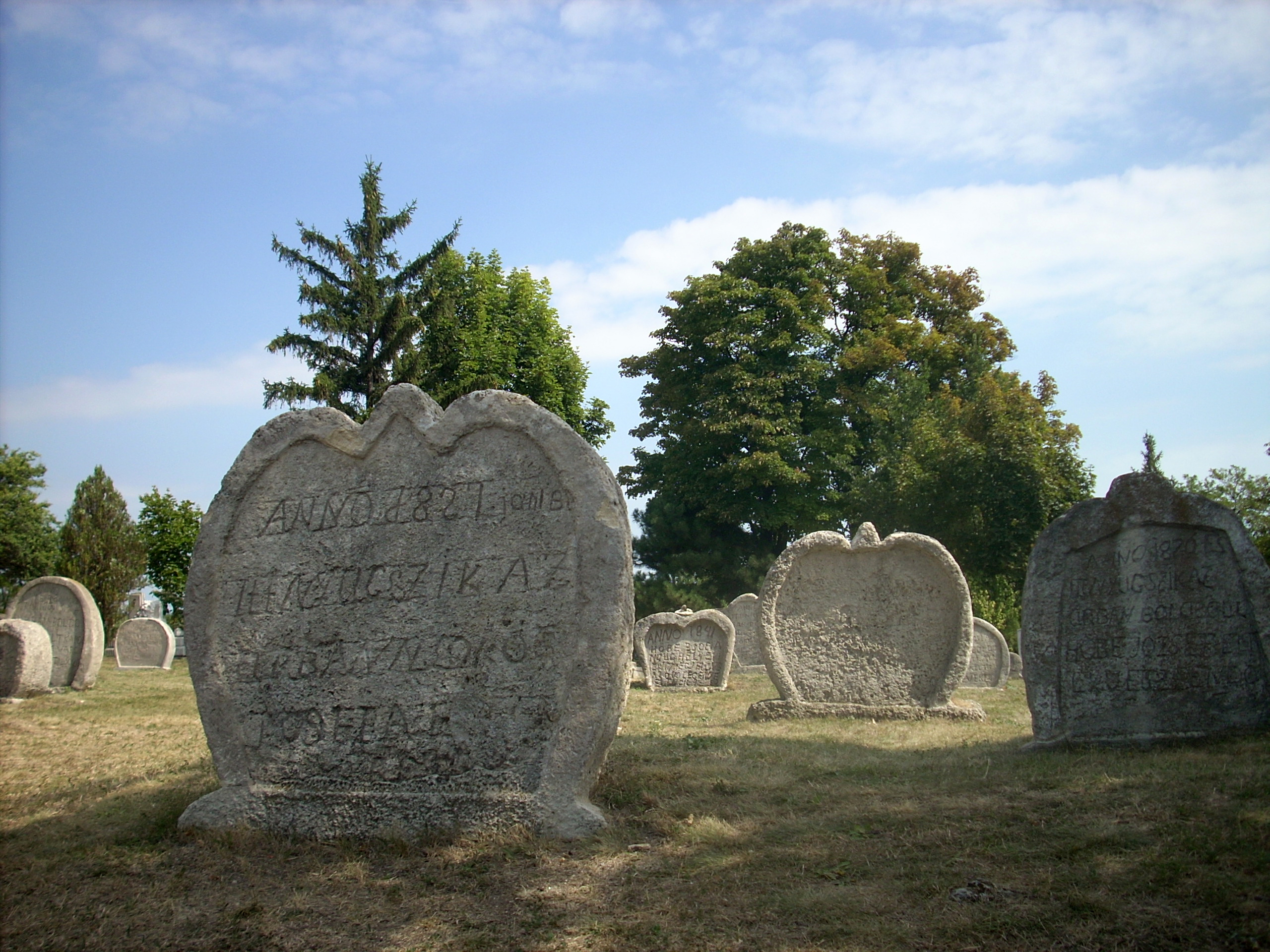
Heart-shaped tombstones

There is a graveyard in Balatonudvari where heart-shaped tombstones can be found. These tombstones are made of white marble. Presumably, the tombstones are made between 1808 and 1840, although some of the signs became unreadable through the passing of the time. Here you can find more than sixty tombstones, which are unique to Hungary. Tombstones like these can only be found in few places (for example in Balatonfüred's graveyard).

Also in Balatonudvari is one of Hungary's few 18 hole championship golf courses, the BalatonGolf Club. This Par 72 course is played over old quarry areas, through wooded hills and over many lakes.

Also in the area is a gallery in Balatonudvari. Here there are works of painters, potters and other artists along with exhibitions of local history and ethnography.
