= Balatonakarattya =

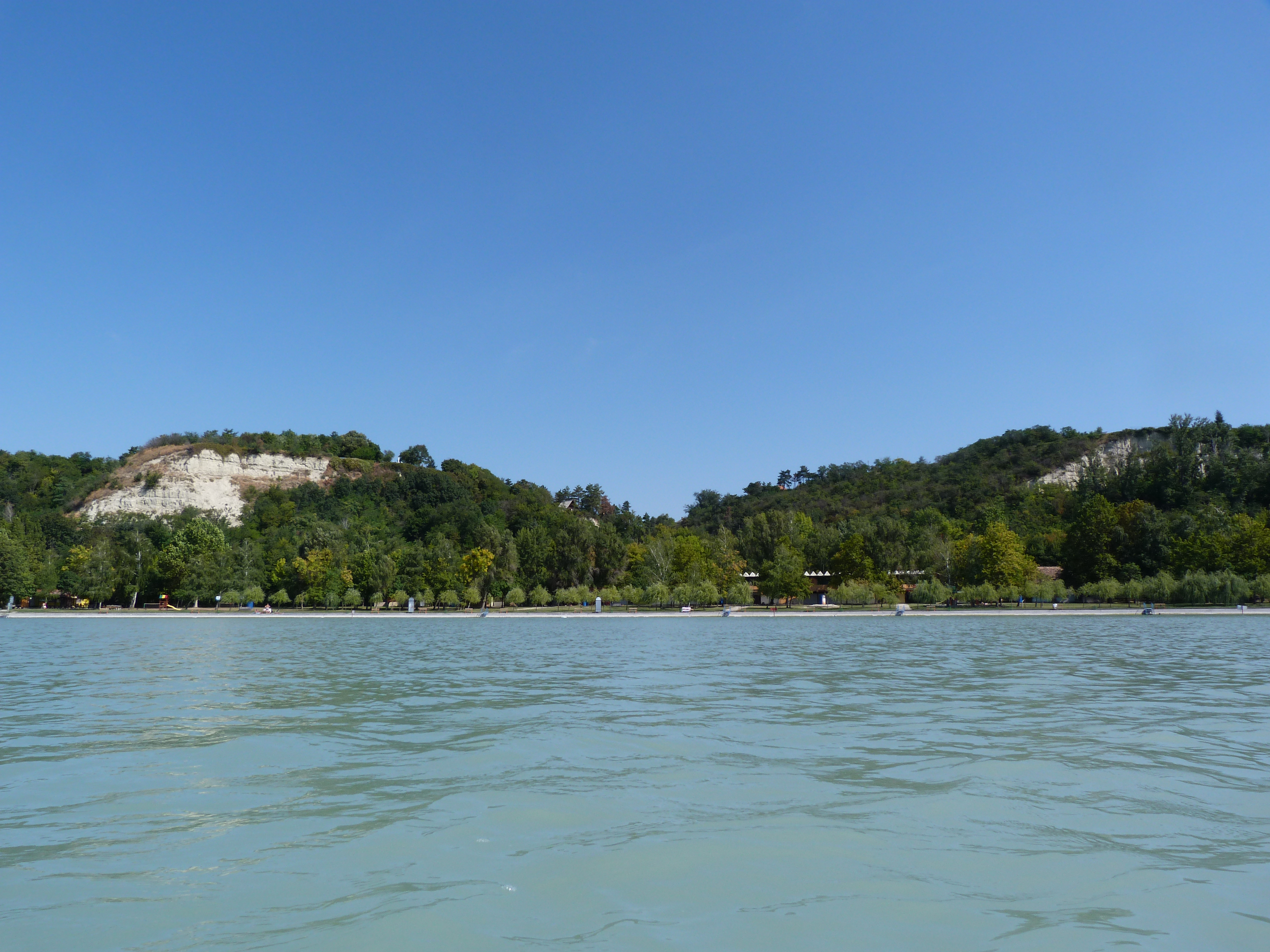
- Bercsényi Beach

- Location in Hungary
- Coordinates: 47°1′10″N 18°9′20″E
- Country: Hungary
- County: Veszprém

Population (2025)
  - Total: 1,214
- Time zone: UTC+1 (CET)
  - Summer (DST): UTC+2 (CEST)
- Postal code: 8174
- Area code: 88

Balatonakarattya is a village in Veszprém county, Hungary, established from the area of the town of Balatonkenese in 2014.

== People ==
- János Kodolányi
