= Óbudavár =

- Flag Coat of arms

- Location of Veszprém county in Hungary

- Location of Óbudavár
- Coordinates: 46.93784°N 17.69022°E
- Country: Hungary
- County: Veszprém

Area
  - Total: 3.23 km^{2} (1.25 sq mi)

Population (2015)
  - Total: 54
  - Density: 17.02/km^{2} (44.1/sq mi)
- Time zone: UTC+1 (CET)
  - Summer (DST): UTC+2 (CEST)
- Postal code: 8272
- Area code: 87

Óbudavár is a village that is located in the District of Balatonfüred, Veszprém county, Hungary.
