= Dörgicse =

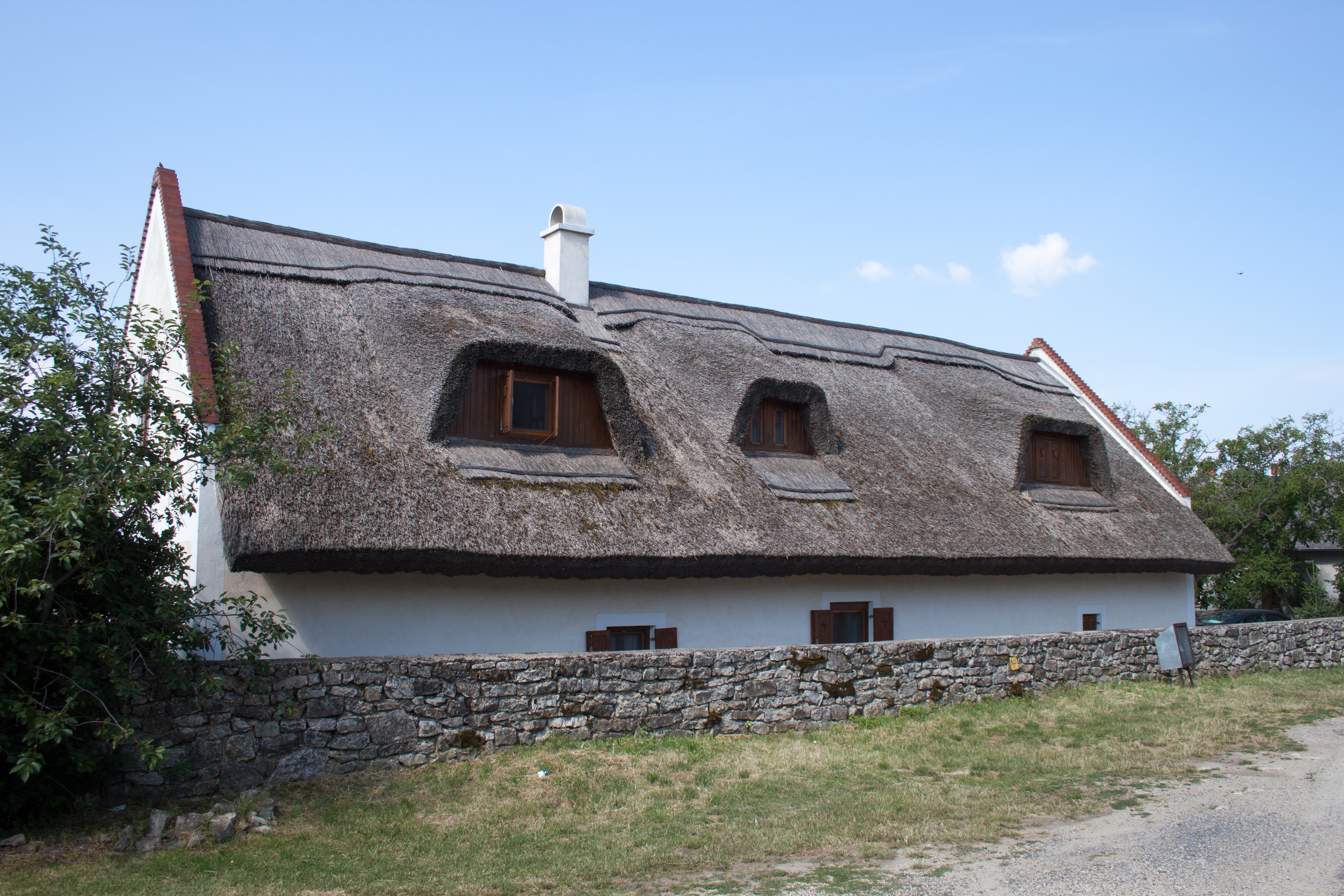
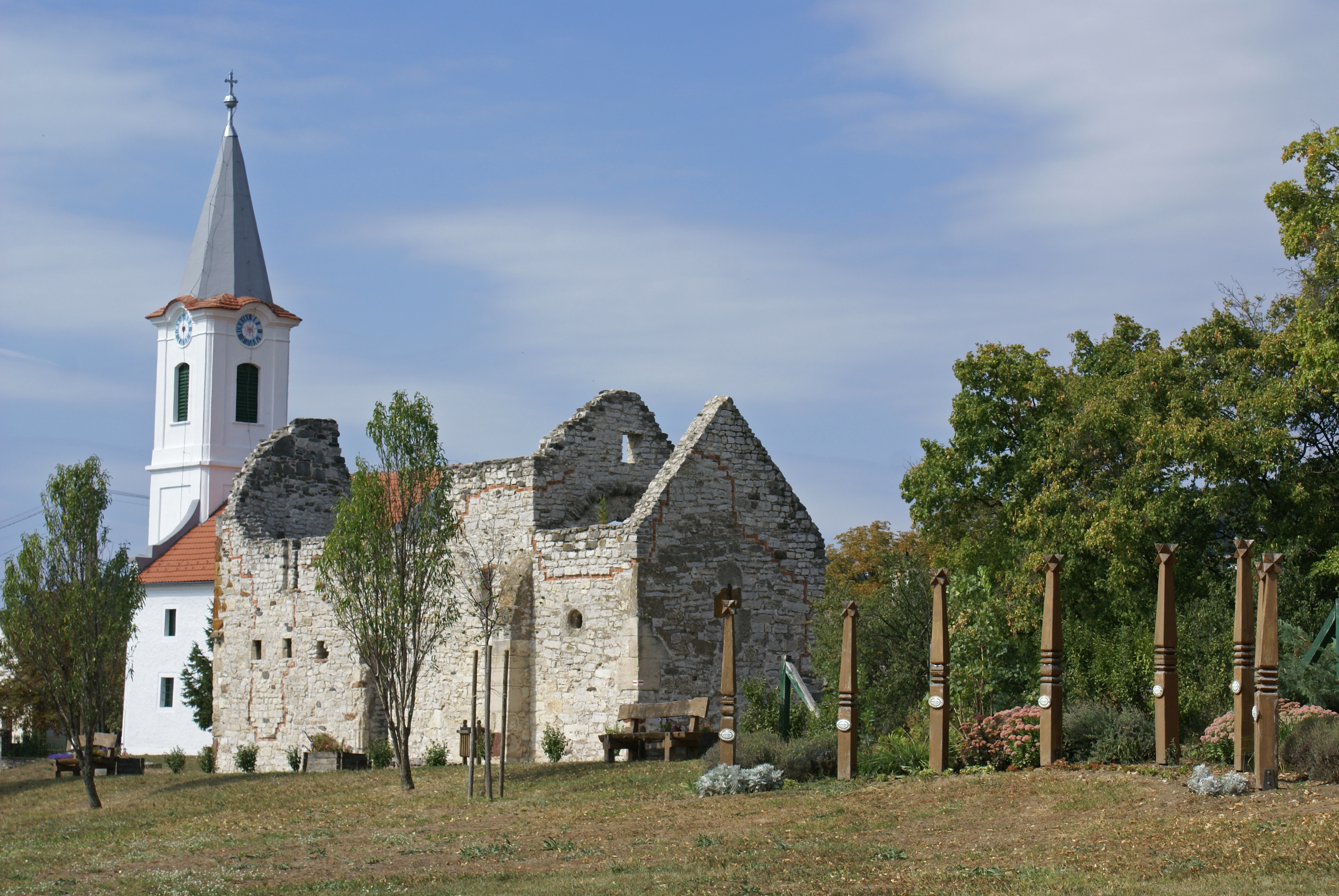
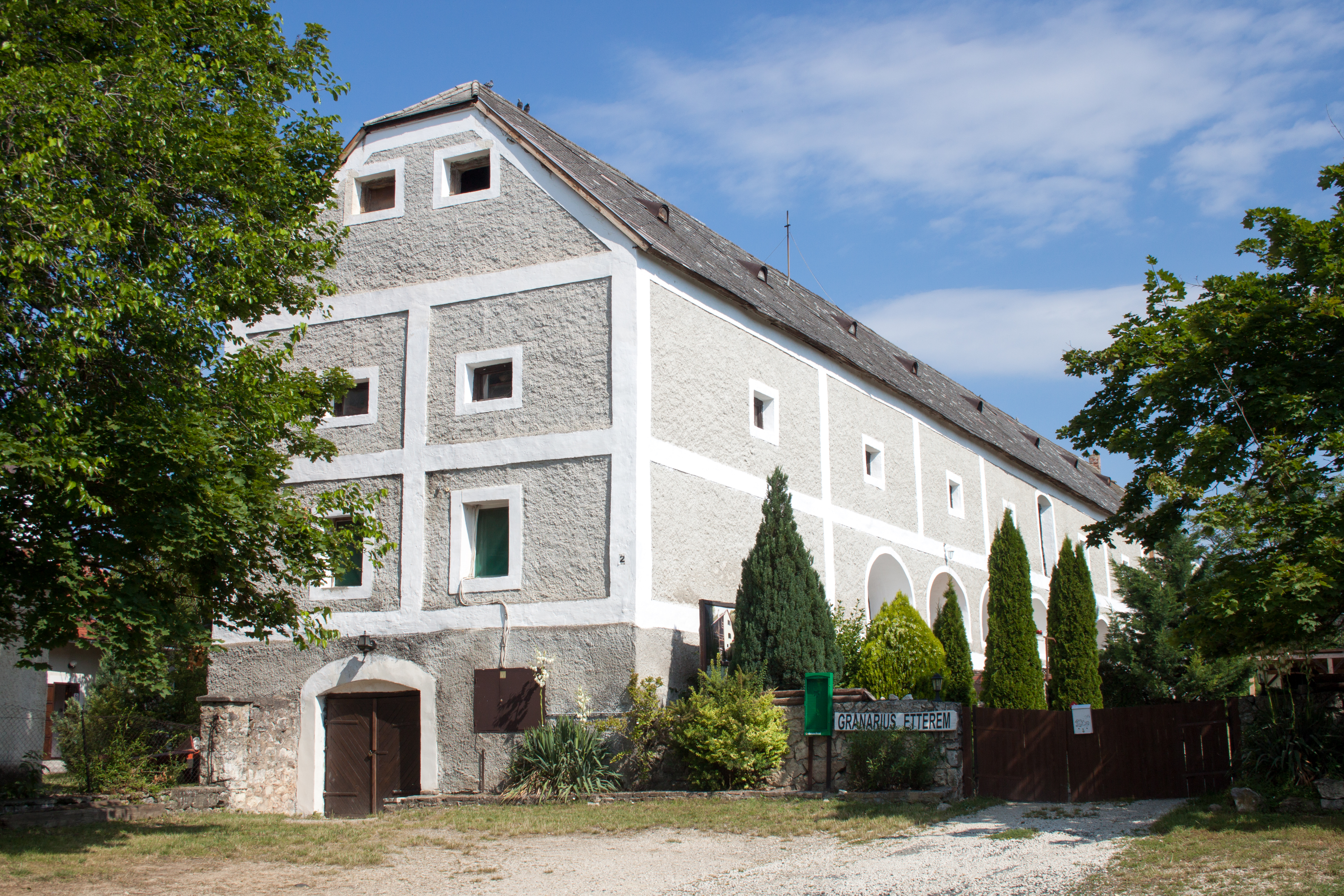

- Flag Coat of arms

- Location of Veszprém county in Hungary

- Location of Dörgicse
- Coordinates: 46.91840°N 17.72293°E
- Country: Hungary
- County: Veszprém

Area
  - Total: 19.12 km^{2} (7.38 sq mi)

Population (2004)
  - Total: 289
  - Density: 15.11/km^{2} (39.1/sq mi)
- Time zone: UTC+1 (CET)
  - Summer (DST): UTC+2 (CEST)
- Postal code: 8244
- Area code: 87

Dörgicse is a village in Veszprém county, Hungary.

It consists of three hamlets (Felsõdörgicse, Alsódörgicse and Kisdörgicse) built on separate hills 4.3 km (2.7 m) north of Lake Balaton. Dörgicse is famous for the wine production and its three medieval churches which were devastated during the Turkish wars in the 16th and 17th centuries.

== Gallery ==
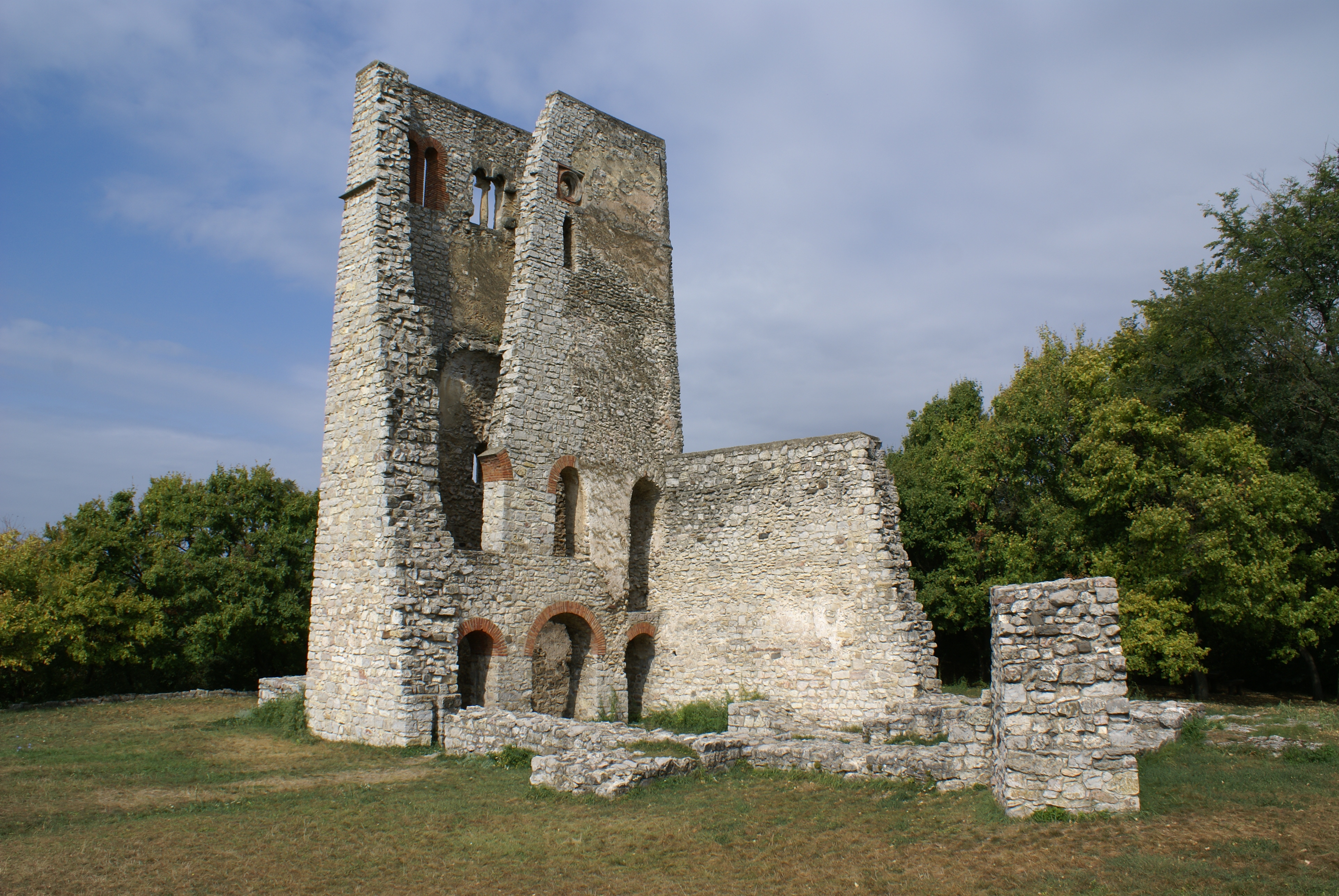
Ruin of medieval church, Alsódörgicse

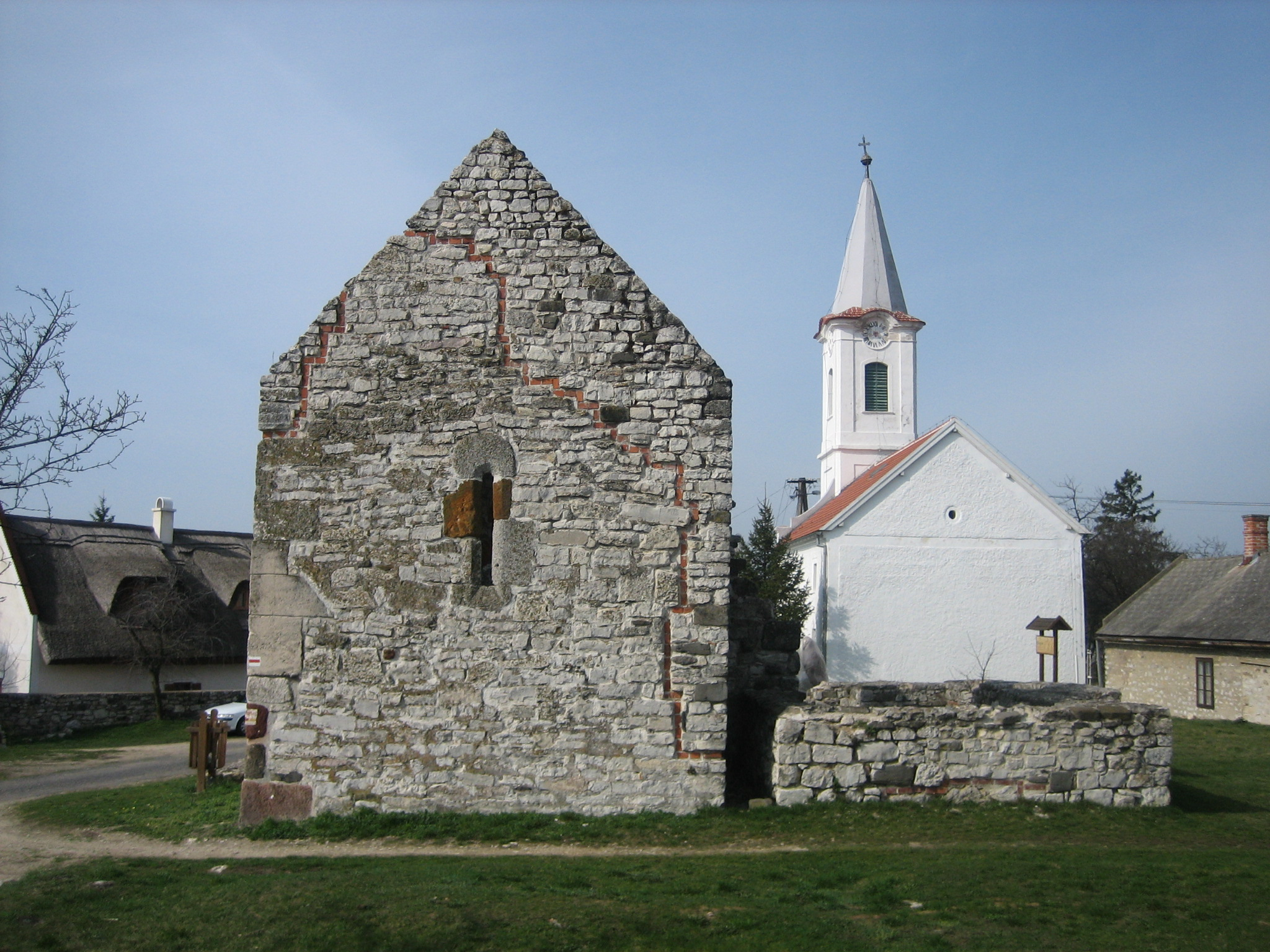
Saint Peter twin church

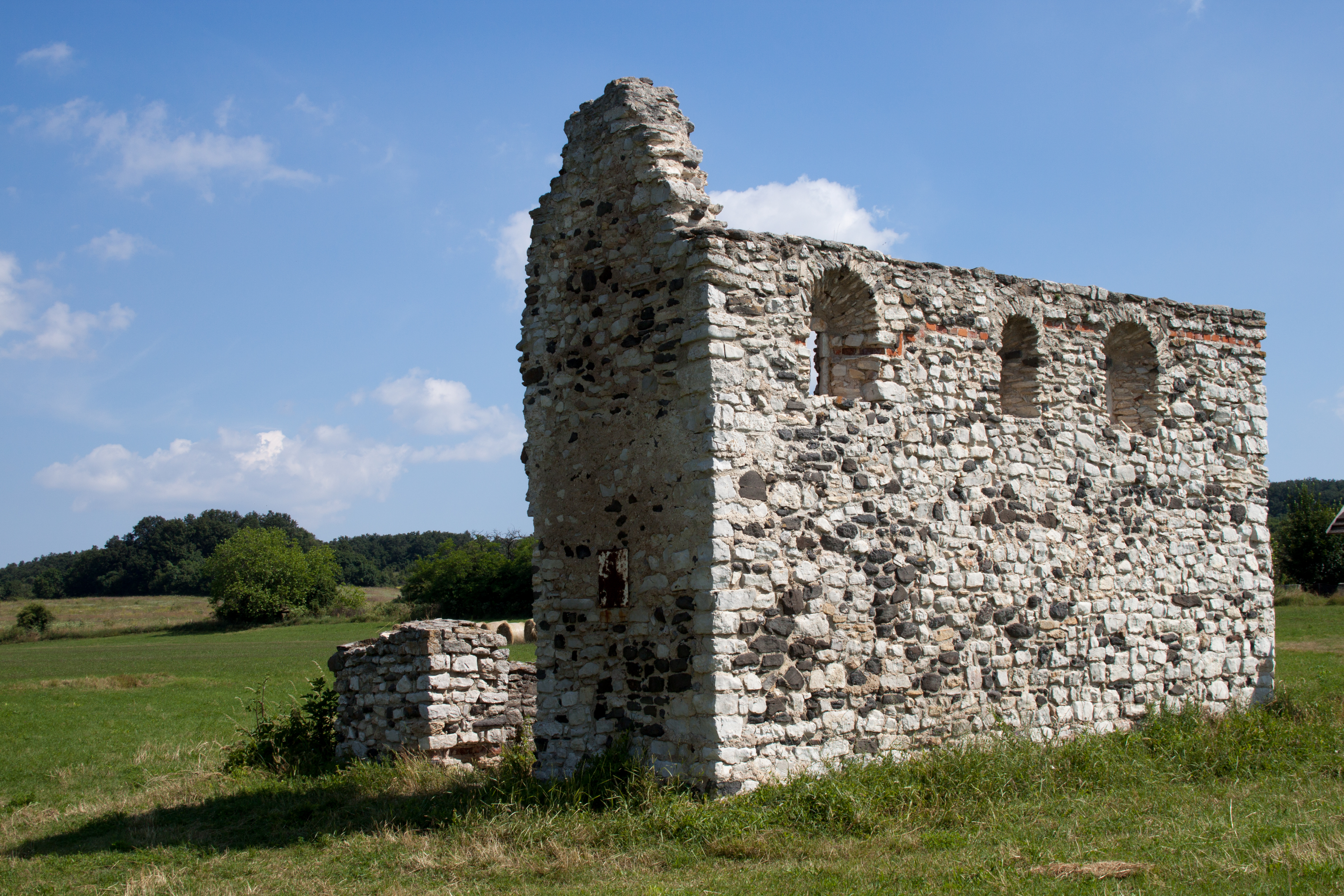
Ruin of medieval church, Kisdörgicse
