= Monoszló =

- Flag Coat of arms

- Location of Veszprém county in Hungary

- Location of Monoszló
- Coordinates: 46.90308°N 17.64029°E
- Country: Hungary
- County: Veszprém

Area
  - Total: 7.46 km^{2} (2.88 sq mi)

Population (2004)
  - Total: 162
  - Density: 21.71/km^{2} (56.2/sq mi)
- Time zone: UTC+1 (CET)
  - Summer (DST): UTC+2 (CEST)
- Postal code: 8273
- Area code: 87

Monoszló is a village in Veszprém county, Hungary.

== History ==
The village is a very ancient settlement mentioned in the old charters. One notable descendant of the village is Lodomer, Archbishop of Esztergom in the second half of the 13th century. during king Ladislaus IV of Hungary. As the Archbishop of Esztergom was the second highest rank within the church in Hungary. The village has an old parish church.

== Sightseeing ==
The church of the village exhibits many medieval details in its architecture. The southern doorway is particularly notable and includes the tree of life, flanked by two birds.

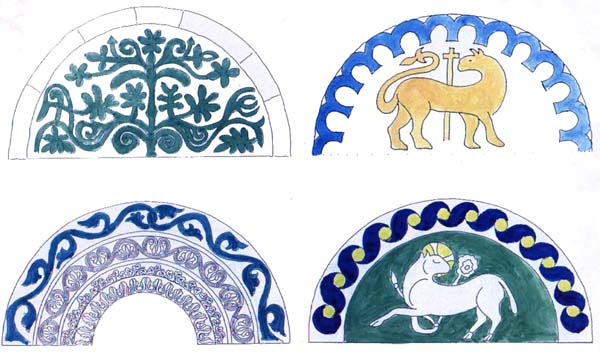
Four romanesque doorway tympanons from Hungary. The left upper is the one from Monoszló.

Nearby is the Hegyestű geological site, where one can observe the needle shaped basalt rock formation created during the area's volcanic past.
