= Balatonkenese =

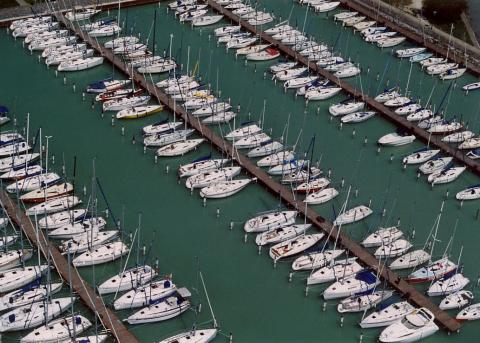
- The marina of Balatonkenese

- Flag Coat of arms

- Location of Veszprém county in Hungary

- Location of Balatonkenese
- Coordinates: 47.03463°N 18.10923°E
- Country: Hungary
- County: Veszprém

Area
  - Total: 65.53 km^{2} (25.30 sq mi)

Population (2017)
  - Total: 2,595
  - Density: 39.60/km^{2} (102.6/sq mi)
- Time zone: UTC+1 (CET)
  - Summer (DST): UTC+2 (CEST)
- Postal code: 8174
- Area code: 88

Balatonkenese (Hungarian pronunciation: [ˈbɒlɒtoŋkɛnɛʃɛ]) is a small town in Veszprém county, Hungary, by Lake Balaton.
