= Tagyon =

- Flag Coat of arms

- Location of Veszprém county in Hungary

- Location of Tagyon
- Coordinates: 46.90371°N 17.67892°E
- Country: Hungary
- County: Veszprém

Area
  - Total: 2.76 km^{2} (1.07 sq mi)

Population (2004)
  - Total: 88
  - Density: 31.88/km^{2} (82.6/sq mi)
- Time zone: UTC+1 (CET)
  - Summer (DST): UTC+2 (CEST)
- Postal code: 8272
- Area code: 87

Tagyon is a village in Veszprém county, Hungary.

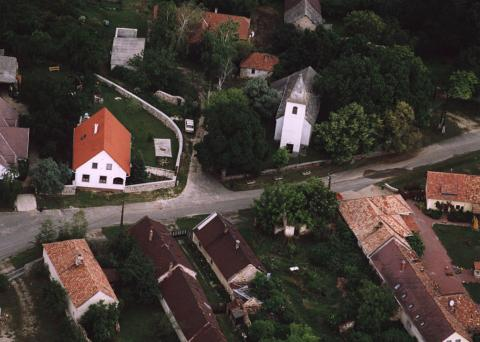
Aerial photography of Tagyon
