= Szentjakabfa =

- Flag Coat of arms

- Location of Veszprém county in Hungary

- Location of Szentjakabfa
- Coordinates: 46.93376°N 17.67627°E
- Country: Hungary
- County: Veszprém

Area
  - Total: 5.76 km^{2} (2.22 sq mi)

Population (2004)
  - Total: 117
  - Density: 20.31/km^{2} (52.6/sq mi)
- Time zone: UTC+1 (CET)
  - Summer (DST): UTC+2 (CEST)
- Postal code: 8272
- Area code: 87

Szentjakabfa is a village in Veszprém county, Hungary.
