= Balatonszepezd =

- Flag Coat of arms

- Location of Balatonszepezd
- Coordinates: 46.85172°N 17.65881°E
- Country: Hungary
- County: Veszprém

Area
  - Total: 25.06 km^{2} (9.68 sq mi)

Population (2017)
  - Total: 374
  - Density: 14.9/km^{2} (38.7/sq mi)
- Time zone: UTC+1 (CET)
  - Summer (DST): UTC+2 (CEST)
- Postal code: 8252
- Area code: 87

Balatonszepezd is a village in Veszprém county, Hungary, on the northern shore of the Lake Balaton.

== History ==
Balatonszepezd was first settled in the 13th century as a fishing village. It was first the domain of royal stewards, then of local nobles, and later on the bishop of Veszprém and the Benedictine Somogyvár Abbey. The old Roman Catholic church was built during this period. As a result of the Turkish invasion, it was almost completely destroyed; after the war, it was repopulated primarily by Germans. The village continued to grow and by the 18th century it was home to another two churches of Calvinist and Lutheran denomination, respectively.

By the 19th century, the village was already a popular holiday destination, but mostly for artists and writers from the relatively nearby towns of Révfülöp and Balatonboglár. However, the efforts of Pál Nagy and Vince Viriusz, coupled with the village's connection to the national railroad system during the early 20th century, soon brought visitors and tourists from all over the country and from abroad. Two distinct new neighborhoods, Szepezdfürdő and Viriusztelep, developed on either side of the old village center with the influx of vacationers and their lake houses. At the same time, the permanent local population decreased due to urbanization.

Today, the smallish village continues to serve as a holiday spot. The main sources of work are tourism and viticulture. Notable historic sites within the village are the buildings on the main street, Árpád street, and the vicinity, which are built in the eclectic and baroque styles, and the three old churches.
