= Balatonszőlős =

- Flag Coat of arms

- Location of Balatonszőlős in Hungary
- Coordinates: 46.9677°N 17.8271°E
- Country: Hungary
- Region: Central Transdanubia
- County: Veszprém

Area
  - Total: 12.81 km^{2} (4.95 sq mi)

Population (2012)
  - Total: 628
  - Density: 49.0/km^{2} (127/sq mi)
- Time zone: UTC+1 (CET)
  - Summer (DST): UTC+2 (CEST)
- Postal code: 8233
- Area code: +36 87
- Website: http://balatonszolos.hu/

Balatonszőlős (Hungarian pronunciation: [ˈbɒlɒtonsøːløːʃ]) is a village in Veszprém county, Hungary.
