= Vászoly =

- Flag Coat of arms

- Location of Veszprém county in Hungary

- Location of Vászoly
- Coordinates: 46.94172°N 17.75905°E
- Country: Hungary
- County: Veszprém

Area
  - Total: 8.55 km^{2} (3.30 sq mi)

Population (2004)
  - Total: 196
  - Density: 22.92/km^{2} (59.4/sq mi)
- Time zone: UTC+1 (CET)
  - Summer (DST): UTC+2 (CEST)
- Postal code: 8245
- Area code: 87

Vászoly is a village in Veszprém county, Hungary.
