= Szentantalfa =

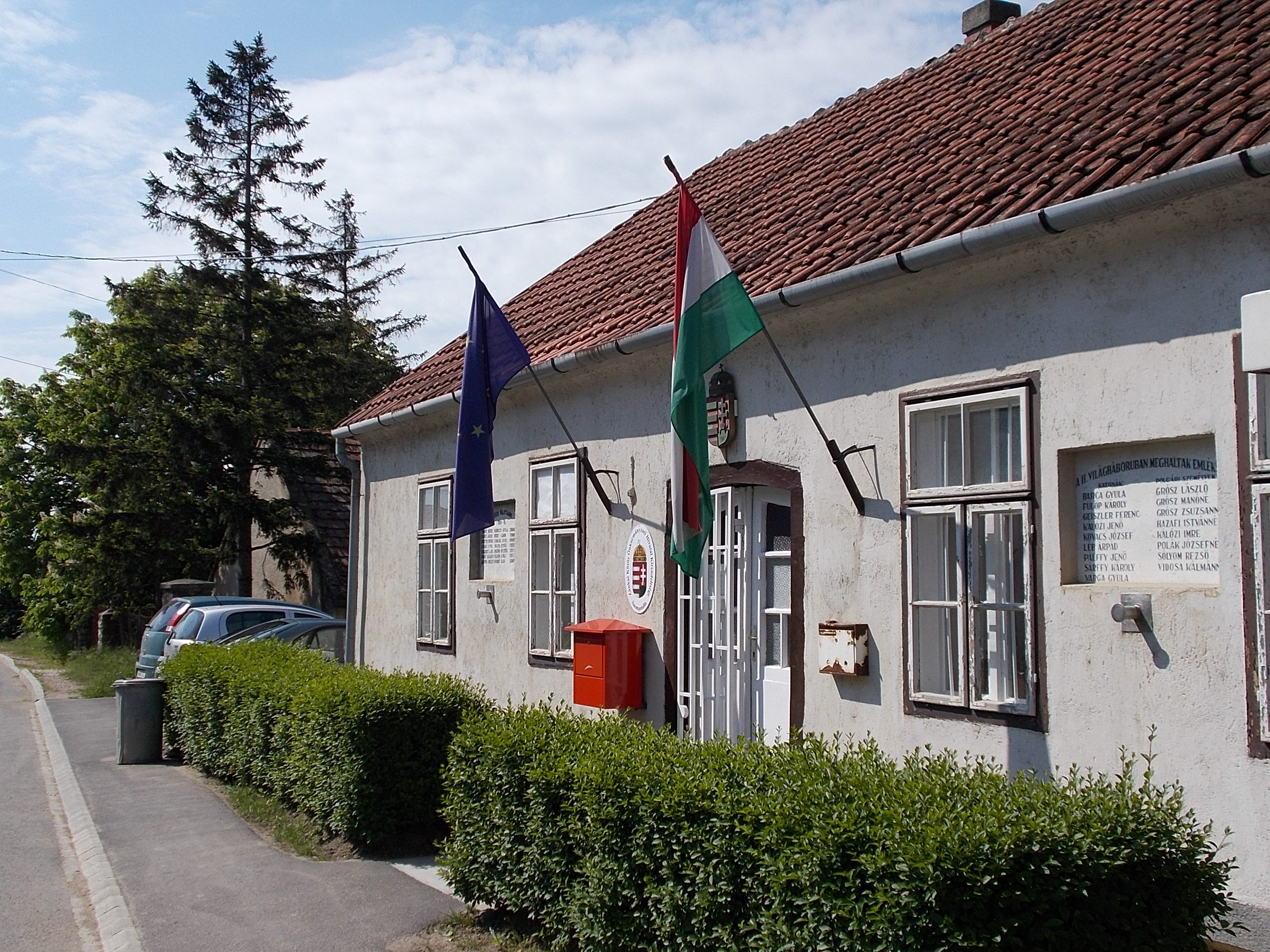
- Village hall

- Flag Coat of arms

- Location of Veszprém county in Hungary

- Location of Szentantalfa
- Coordinates: 46.91294°N 17.67406°E
- Country: Hungary
- County: Veszprém

Area
  - Total: 6.61 km^{2} (2.55 sq mi)

Population (2004)
  - Total: 417
  - Density: 63.08/km^{2} (163.4/sq mi)
- Time zone: UTC+1 (CET)
  - Summer (DST): UTC+2 (CEST)
- Postal code: 8272
- Area code: 87

Szentantalfa is a village in Veszprém county, Hungary.
