= Balatoncsicsó =

- Flag Coat of arms

- Location of Veszprém county in Hungary

- Location of Balatoncsicsó
- Coordinates: 46.92775°N 17.66897°E
- Country: Hungary
- County: Veszprém

Area
  - Total: 13.2 km^{2} (5.1 sq mi)

Population (2025)
  - Total: 279
  - Density: 13.33/km^{2} (34.5/sq mi)
- Time zone: UTC+1 (CET)
  - Summer (DST): UTC+2 (CEST)
- Postal code: 8272
- Area code: 87

Balatoncsicsó (Hungarian pronunciation: [ˈbɒlɒtont͡ʃit͡ʃoː]) is a village in Veszprém county, Hungary, situated in the hills on the North Shore of Lake Balaton.
