= Pécsely =

- Flag Coat of arms

- Location of Veszprém county in Hungary

- Location of Pécsely
- Coordinates: 46.95593°N 17.78549°E
- Country: Hungary
- County: Veszprém

Area
  - Total: 20.01 km^{2} (7.73 sq mi)

Population (2004)
  - Total: 562
  - Density: 28.08/km^{2} (72.7/sq mi)
- Time zone: UTC+1 (CET)
  - Summer (DST): UTC+2 (CEST)
- Postal code: 8245
- Area code: 87

Pécsely is a village in Veszprém county, Hungary. It lies in the Balaton highlands and falls within the Balatonfüred-Csopak Wine District.

The ruins of the Zádor Castle lie on Derék hill above the village.

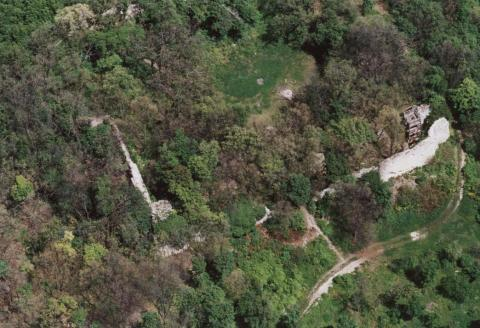
Aerial photography of castle ruins in Pécsely
