= Aszófő =

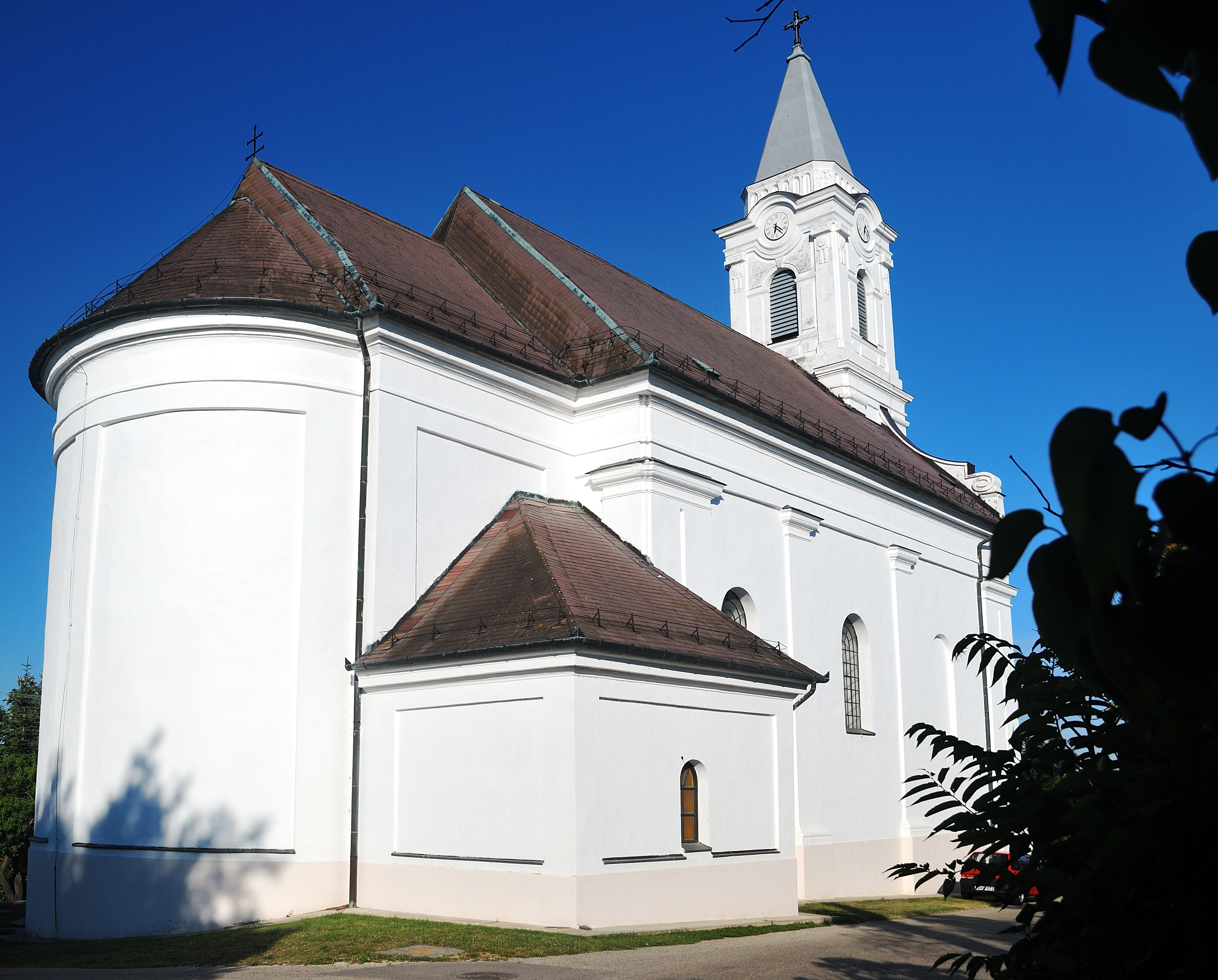
- Church of Saint Luke

- Flag Coat of arms

- Location of Veszprém county in Hungary

- Location of Aszófő
- Coordinates: 46.93026°N 17.83168°E
- Country: Hungary
- County: Veszprém

Area
  - Total: 8.32 km^{2} (3.21 sq mi)

Population (2017)
  - Total: 403
  - Density: 48.4/km^{2} (125/sq mi)
- Time zone: UTC+1 (CET)
  - Summer (DST): UTC+2 (CEST)
- Postal code: 8241
- Area code: 87

Aszófő is a village in Veszprém county, Hungary.
