= Alsóörs =

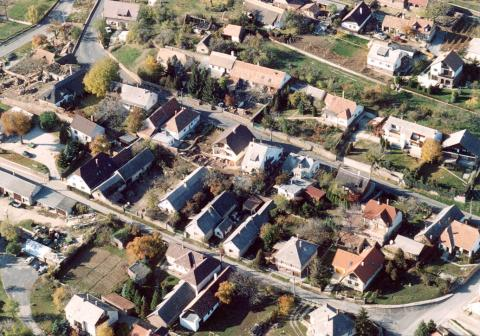

- Flag Coat of arms

- Location of Veszprém county in Hungary

- Location of Alsóörs
- Coordinates: 46.99447°N 17.97357°E
- Country: Hungary
- County: Veszprém

Area
  - Total: 33.34 km^{2} (12.87 sq mi)

Population (2017)
  - Total: 1,732
  - Density: 51.95/km^{2} (134.5/sq mi)
- Time zone: UTC+1 (CET)
  - Summer (DST): UTC+2 (CEST)
- Postal code: 8226
- Area code: 87

Alsóörs is a village in Veszprém county, Hungary.
