= Örvényes =

- Flag Coat of arms

- Location of Veszprém county in Hungary

- Location of Örvényes
- Coordinates: 46.91455°N 17.81997°E
- Country: Hungary
- County: Veszprém

Area
  - Total: 4.46 km^{2} (1.72 sq mi)

Population (2017)
  - Total: 123
  - Density: 27.6/km^{2} (71.4/sq mi)
- Time zone: UTC+1 (CET)
  - Summer (DST): [[UTC+2 ok]] (CEST)
- Postal code: 8242
- Area code: 87

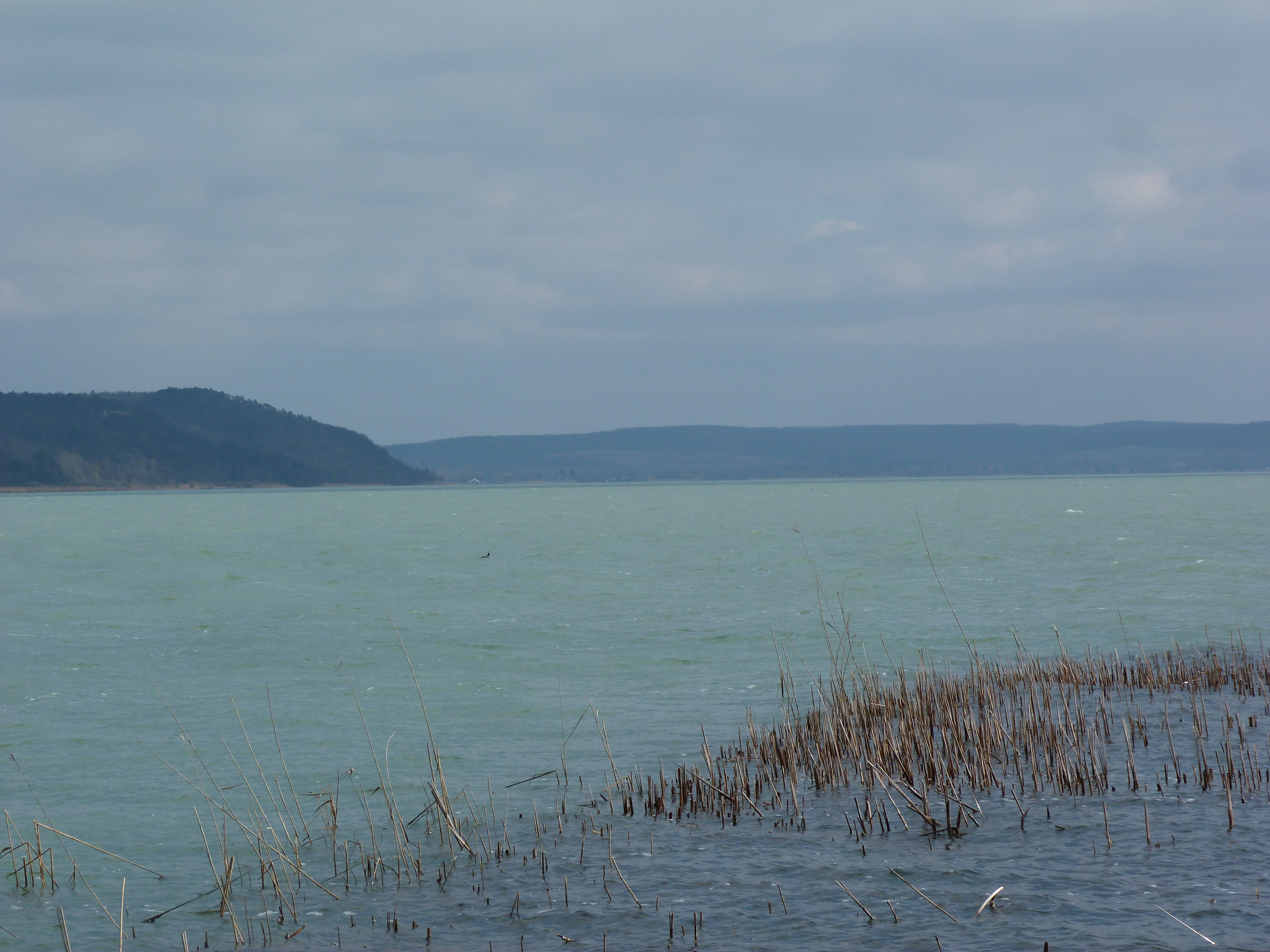
Örvényes - where the water meets the sky

Örvényes is a village at Lake Balaton, in Veszprém county, Hungary.
