= Balatonakali =

- Flag Coat of arms

- Location of Veszprém county in Hungary

- Location of Balatonakali
- Coordinates: 46.88366°N 17.75100°E
- Country: Hungary
- County: Veszprém

Area
  - Total: 36.2 km^{2} (14.0 sq mi)

Population (2017)
  - Total: 639
  - Density: 17.7/km^{2} (45.7/sq mi)
- Time zone: UTC+1 (CET)
  - Summer (DST): UTC+2 (CEST)
- Postal code: 8243
- Area code: 87

Balatonakali (Hungarian pronunciation: [ˈbɒlɒtonɒkɒli]) is a village in Veszprém county, Hungary.
