= Benedict Rád =

13th-century Hungarian Catholic bishop

- Bishop of Veszprém
- Seal of Benedict Rád, 1299
- Installed: 1289
- Term ended: 1309
- Predecessor: Peter Kőszegi
- Successor: Stephen Kéki
- Other post: Chancellor of the Queen

Personal details
- Died: June/December 1309
- Denomination: Catholic Church

Benedict from the kindred Rád (Hungarian: Rád nembeli Benedek; died June/December 1309) was a Hungarian prelate at the turn of the 13th and 14th centuries, who served as Bishop of Veszprém from 1289 until his death. He was a confidant of Andrew III of Hungary, serving chancellor of the queenly court. During the era of Interregnum, he supported the claim of Wenceslaus then Otto against Charles I. He crowned Otto with the Holy Crown in 1305.

== Family background ==
Benedict was born into the gens (clan) Rád, which – descending from the late-10th-century Bavarian knight Vecellin – was once among the most powerful and wealthiest families, but by the early 13th century had become impoverished and insignificant. His parentage is uncertain. He was born into that branch, which possessed lands in Veszprém and Bodrog counties. He had multiple siblings. Although the late Philip, the lord of Kővár (Kamengrad) from the clan's Požega County branch is referred to as his "frater" in 1291, but, due to chronological reasons, this likely indicates a more distant relationship (perhaps that of a cousin or nephew). Benedict's cousin was Stephen, son of Protasius, who exchanged his lands Vámos and a vineyard in Paloznak, Zala County for Asszonyfalva and five fishponds in Bodrog County with the Diocese of Veszprém in March 1307.

== Bishop of Veszprém ==
=== Under the last Árpáds ===
Benedict entered ecclesiastical service, but his early career is unknown. Historian György Bónis considered that he is identical with that Benedict, who attended the University of Padua in 1285 and 1286, obtaining the title of decretorum doctor. In this capacity, he also taught at the university. However, it is more possible that this data attributes to his contemporary Benedict, the Bishop of Várad.

He was elected bishop sometime after the murder of his predecessor Peter Kőszegi, between May and November 1289. However, a charter of the cathedral chapter of Veszprém from August 1288 also refers to him as bishop. Beside that, Benedict also served as chancellor of the queenly court under Isabella of Sicily, the consort of King Ladislaus IV from 1289 to 1290. In 1289, Benedict was among the four prelates, along with Lodomer, John Hont-Pázmány and Andrew of Győr, who sent a letter to Ladislaus IV to change his way of life and behavior because the people will turn against him, according to the contemporary Steirische Reimchronik ("Styrian Rhyming Chronicle"). Thereafter, Benedict was among those prelates led by Archbishop Lodomer, who supported the claim of Duke Andrew against the monarch. When the pretender arrived to Hungary in early 1290, he was greeted him by Benedict Rád and the powerful baron Ivan Kőszegi in Zadar. However, they abandoned the plan to provide an escort to the duke into the middle of the realm. After Ladislaus IV was assassinated and Andrew III ascended the Hungarian throne in July 1290, he married Fenenna of Kuyavia, who arrived to the kingdom in the autumn. Benedict initially maintained his position in her court too, but, for unknown reasons, Bishop Andrew of Eger replaced him sometime later (he is mentioned in this capacity by some charters of Fenenna in 1291). Later, however, Benedict recovered the office around September 1291. Benedict held the dignity in the court of Agnes of Austria, the second wife of Andrew III, too, until the death of the king and extinction of the Árpád dynasty in January 1301.

Since the 1290s, Benedict steadfastly endeavored to defend the right of ownership over the diocese's estates. In May 1290, he protested against that decision when Queen Isabella donated the lands of Szentvidkála and Csicsónivegy to her courtier Mikó Szécs, because both estates belonged to the Diocese of Veszprém. As a result, the queen donated Lovas and Vámos in Veszprém County to Mikó, instead. In the very first days of January 1291, Benedict complained to Andrew III that brothers Apor and Lucas from the gens Péc had besieged and captured the castle of Tátika (lay near Zalaszántó) from the bishopric. Despite his protest, the diocese was never able to regain the fort, but King Charles I compensated them in 1341. In the same charter, he also complained to King Andrew III that Csák, son of Bágyon (Bagun) from the gens Csák seized the fort of Crkvenik (Kővár or Kamengrad) in Slavonia from him and his brothers. In May 1291, Benedict confirmed the regula of the Pauline friars given by his predecessor Paul Balog. He handed over two additional churches in Pilisszentkereszt and Kékes to them. Benedict and his episcopal banderium participated in the military campaign against the Duchy of Austria in the summer of 1291, when Andrew III invaded the borderland, forcing Duke Albert to withdraw his garrisons from the towns and fortresses that he had captured years before. It is plausible that he was present, when the Hungarian and Austrian delegations concluded a truce at Pressburg in late August 1291. The Steirische Reimchronik incorrectly refers to his predecessor, the late Peter Kőszegi as participant of the negotiations. In August 1291, Benedict complained before the cathedral chapter of Esztergom that Ivan Kőszegi unlawfully seized the estate Egerszeg from the bishopric. By early 1292, he also frequently complained that city judge Nicholas had occupied the episcopal palace in Székesfehérvár sometime after the death of his brother, Bishop Peter Kőszegi. This unlawful situation persisted even in 1299.

In October 1291 and February 1292, the bishop granted the social status of nobles of the Church to the diocese's several faithful serfs in Köveskál. Benedict attended the provincial synod of Esztergom in May 1292. For his faithful service and the aforementioned participation in the Austrian–Hungarian War, Benedict was granted the ducal land Fajsz by King Andrew III in April 1294. The bishop already held the land due to Queen Isabella's former donation in his favour. Upon Benedict's request in July 1294, Andrew III confirmed the privilege he had granted in May 1278 – while he was still a claimant to the Hungarian throne – which exempted the people of the Diocese of Veszprém (in the counties of Somogy, Veszprém, and Zala) from the jurisdiction of the local ispáns. In March 1295, Benedict renounced the tithes due to him in the villages Háros, Födémes, Csút and Kocsola in favor of the provost of Csút (in present-day Budafok). In exchange, Benedict was granted Csát in Tolna County along with 18 possessions with their accessories in Somogy County by Lodomer. Around 1295, Benedict sent Stephen, the archdeacon of Segesd to Tihany Abbey to transcribe an existent copy of the lost foundation letter of the Diocese of Veszprém. Benedict crowned Queen Agnes in February 1296. In the early months of 1296, Benedict and the cathedral chapter were involved in a successful lawsuit against Conrad Győr and his son James over the estates Patvására (now an uninhabited forest between Litér and Papkeszi) and Nosztraj (south of Várpalota). Andrew III confirmed these acquisitions for Benedict in June 1296. Benedict confirmed the privileges and exemptions of the nuns of Veszprém Valley in March 1297.

Under Benedict, the lawsuit against the Stephanites concerning the tithes, estates and revenues of the Church of Virgin Mary in Buda had continued; he lodged his appeal to the Roman Curia in 1295. He claimed that the Stephanites desecrated and destroyed the church of St. Andrew in Szentkirály, also stealing its property and income. Pope Boniface VIII instructed the abbot of Zirc to investigate the complaint and to apply excommunication if the allegations are proven. In 1297, Benedict appointed provost Andronicus and Joseph, the archdeacon of Szentendre to provide legal representation for the diocese against the Stephanites in the lawsuit before the Holy See. The litigation continued in the subsequent decades. Benedict became embroiled in a lawsuit with the collegiate chapter of Buda regarding the tithes in the Hungarian capital, which had been leased to the local burghers. Benedict was also involved in conflict with the Cistercian monastery of Bélakút concerning the collection of tithes in Kelenföld and Sasad (present-day boroughs of Budapest). They reached an agreement with the mediation of Archbishop Lodomer in November 1291. Nevertheless, this conflict also continued in the following years; for instance, in July 1297, the abbot of Bélakút accused Benedict's officials to forcibly stole 25 barrels of wine from the wine tithe in Kelenföld due to the monastery. The pope delegated Benedict to judge over the lawsuit between the monastery on Rabbits' Island and the city council of Buda. Boniface entrusted Benedict to investigate the city council's "aggressive anti-clerical steps" in May 1298.

Benedict belonged to the entourage of the royal couple Andrew III and Agnes, who, in February 1298, visited Albert of Austria in Vienna and promised to support him against Adolf of Nassau, King of Germany. He was present at the betrothal of Wenceslaus, son of Wenceslaus II of Bohemia, and Elizabeth, daughter of Andrew III. Alongside the other prelates of the realm, Benedict attended that national diet in July 1298, where Albertino Morosini, King Andrew's maternal uncle, was accorded the status of a Hungarian nobleman. There, Archbishop John Hont-Pázmány and the suffragans, including Benedict, adopted constitutional reforms aimed at strengthening royal power against the private interests of the barons. Benedict also participated in the national diet convoked to Buda in July 1299. There, the prelates sent a letter to Pope Boniface to interpret the complaints of Andrew III, Archbishop John and the "entire prelacy and nobility" regarding the behavior of the pro-Angevin Gregory Bicskei and asked Boniface to place them under papal patronage against the archbishop-elect. Benedict visited Rome on the occasion of the jubilee year in 1300, alongside Bishop Anthony of Csanád, Dominic, the provost of Vác and Paul, the lector of Székesfehérvár. There, he petitioned for the diocese's interests concerning the lost-lasting conflict with Bélakút Abbey over the tithes in Kelenföld and Sasad. In the same year, Benedict allowed the superiors of the Franciscans to preach and hear confessions, to grant the privilege of indulgences to their parishioners and churches in the territory of the Diocese of Veszprém. Upon his request, Queen Agnes returned the tithes of Csepel Island to the diocese in August 1300.

=== During the interregnum ===
Andrew III died suddenly on 14 January 1301, which resulted the extinction of the Árpád dynasty. Benedict, as her chancellor, remained a member of the entourage of Queen Agnes in the following days. After her departure from Hungary, The queen's court was dissolved, since neither Wenceslaus nor Otto had a wife during their stay in Hungary. Despite that, Benedict styled himself chancellor of the queen's court until his death. Queen Maria of Bytom, the wife of their rival Charles I, formed her own chancellery by 1309 at the latest; Paul, the provost of Szepes (who, otherwise, functioned as vice-chancellor of the queenly court from 1299 to 1301, under Benedict) was styled as her chancellor in March 1309, when Benedict was still alive.

Alongside the majority of the prelates, Benedict supported the candidacy of Wenceslaus of Bohemia to the Hungarian throne, against the efforts of Charles of Anjou. Benedict was present in his coronation in August 1301. In the early months of 1301, Benedict sent a complaint to the Roman Curia that certain residents of Szentendre had occupied one of his properties. After an investigation on behalf of Pope Boniface, the aforementioned persons from the town were excommunicated. He was also involved in a lawsuit against the nuns of Veszprém Valley concerning the latter's tithe exemption in that year, but the hearing of the case was adjourned twice (in October and November), and ultimately failed in December due to the absence of two judge-delegates (Seraphin Zselizi, the provost of Pressburg, and Stephen, the abbot of Pilis). His conflict with the city council of Buda had continued; in December 1301, papal legate Niccolò Boccasini determined that the city council had deliberately failed to pay the amount due for the tithes leased from the Diocese of Veszprém. This conflict contributed significantly to the emergence of the Buda heretical movement, which culminated in 1304. Sometime between 1301 and 1303, Cardinal Boccasini ordered Benedict to suspend the friars of Somogyvár Abbey from participating in church ceremonies due to non-payment of the legate's procurations, and, if they failed to pay their debt regardless, to apply excommunication against them. Within the walls of the Franciscan monastery of Buda, Benedict concluded an agreement with William, the abbot of Bélakút concerning their legal dispute in September 1302. Benedict was present in Buda in September 1302, when Charles' forces unsuccessfully besieged Wenceslaus' capital. Despite that, in 1303, Benedict's legal disputes against the Stephanites and the Bélakút Abbey both continued with mutual accusations of violating the agreements.

Upon the invitation of Pope Boniface VIII, Benedict was a member of that Hungarian clerical delegation, which visited the Roman Curia and met the pope and Charles' grandmother Mary, Queen of Naples in the spring of 1303. Pope Boniface, who regarded Hungary as a fief of the Holy See declared Charles the lawful king of Hungary on 31 May 1303. The Hungarian prelates, led by Stephen, Archbishop of Kalocsa traveled further to the Neapolitan court. By that time, the majority of the prelates had already switched to the side of Charles one after another, but Benedict Rád and Anthony of Csanád remained partisans of Wenceslaus, despite that the papal bull threatened his subjects with excommunication.

The young king's father, Wenceslaus II of Bohemia realized that the position of his son could not be strengthened and took him back from Hungary to Bohemia in August 1304. The Bohemian king even took the Holy Crown with himself to Prague. The Steirische Reimchronik suggests that the powerful lord Ivan Kőszegi was the source of ideas for this action. After the outbreak of scandal, Kőszegi faced general uproar and anger against his person; the barons blamed him for having lost the crown jewels. In response, he promised through Bishop Benedict to recover the Holy Crown from Bohemia within a year, if they guarantee his safety. Thereafter, according to the chronicle, Ivan Kőszegi sent a letter to Duke Otto of Bavaria, Béla IV's grandson, and invited him to the Hungarian throne. After negotiations, Wenceslaus abandoned his claim to the Hungarian throne in favor of Otto and handed the Holy Crown over to him in Brno on 9 October 1305. When Otto arrived to Hungary, both Benedict and Anthony joined his entourage. They jointly crowned the new pretender with the Holy Crown in Székesfehérvár on 6 December 1305 (i.e. it did not fulfill one of the criteria for a regular coronation, because the archbishop of Esztergom was not the celebrant). Immediately after the coronation, King Otto dismissed the two bishops from his closest retinue. Historian Renáta Skorka argued the two bishops only pretended to side with Otto to regain the Holy Crown, but the land grants made to Benedict Rád by Otto contradict this; namely, for the celebration of his coronation, Otto granted the royal villages of Nagyszentjakab, Herend and Tagyon in Zala County to Benedict on 28 July 1306.

Pope Clement V was outraged by the coronation of Otto performed by Anthony and Benedict. Therefore, on 10 August 1307, he instructed the two Hungarian archbishops, Thomas of Esztergom and Vincent of Kalocsa to summon Benedict before the papal curia because of his involvement in Otto's coronation, and to proclaim the papal judgment that Charles is the rightful Hungarian king. Under pain of excommunication and interdict, the pope ordered Otto's supporters – including Benedict – to cease supporting the "usurper." Following the imprisonment of Otto in Transylvania, Benedict finally swore loyalty to Charles I. He attended that national diet convoked by papal legate Gentile Portino da Montefiore in November 1308, where Charles was elected king. In 1308–1309, a new lawsuit emerged between Benedict and the Stephanites. He was present at the second coronation of Charles I in Buda on 15 June 1309. The prelates, including Benedict, testified their presence and approval on 24 June. These are the last occasions on which Benedict appears as a living person. He died soon, since the provost of the cathedral chapter, Stephen Kéki was elected as his successor still in 1309.

== Sources ==
- Barabás, Gábor (2023). Delegated Papal Jurisdiction in Arpadian Hungary. Bishops – provosts – papal chaplains. Arpadiana XVI., Research Centre for the Humanities. ISBN 978-963-416-405-0.
- Engel, Pál (1996). Magyarország világi archontológiája, 1301–1457, I. [Secular Archontology of Hungary, 1301–1457, Volume I] (in Hungarian). História, MTA Történettudományi Intézete. ISBN 963-8312-44-0.
- Gárdonyi, Albert (1915). "A magyar királyné udvari kancelláriája az Anjouk alatt [The Chancellery of the Hungarian Queens' Court under the Angevins]". Turul (in Hungarian). 33 (3–4): 64–84. ISSN 1216-7258.
- Gutheil, Jenő (1979). Az Árpád-kori Veszprém [Veszprém During the Age of Árpáds] (in Hungarian). Veszprém Megyei Levéltár. ISBN 9630111594.
- Haraszti Szabó, Péter; Kelényi, Borbála (2019). Magyarországi diákok francia, angol, itáliai és német egyetemeken a középkorban, 1100–1526 [Students from Hungary at the Universities of France, England, Italy and Germany in the Middle Ages 1100–1526] (in Hungarian). ELTE Egyetemi Könyvtár és Levéltár; MTA ELTE Egyetemtörténeti Kutatócsoport. ISBN 978-963-489-098-0.
- Kádár, Tamás (2015). "Harcban a koronáért. I. Károly (Róbert) király uralkodásának első évei 1305 végéig [Fight for the Crown. The First Regnal Years of Charles I (Robert) until the End of 1305]". Történeti Tanulmányok. Acta Universitatis Debreceniensis (in Hungarian). 23: 42–111. ISSN 1217-4602.
- Kádár, Tamás (2017). "Harcban a koronáért. (II.) I. Károly (Róbert) király uralkodásának 1306–1310 közötti szakasza [Fight for the Crown. The Reign of Charles I (Robert) from 1306 to 1310]". Történeti Tanulmányok. Acta Universitatis Debreceniensis (in Hungarian). 25: 126–192. ISSN 1217-4602.
- Karácsonyi, János (1900). A magyar nemzetségek a XIV. század közepéig. [The Hungarian genera until the middle of the 14th century] (in Hungarian). Hungarian Academy of Sciences.
- Maléth, Ágnes (2025). The Kingdom of Hungary and the Holy See. Relations in the time of Charles I (1301–1342). Arpadiana XIX., Research Centre for the Humanities. ISBN 978-963-416-482-1.
- Rácz, György (2020). "Az egyházi elit változásai [Changes in the Church Elite]". In Csukovits, Enikő (ed.). Az Anjou-kor hatalmi elitje (in Hungarian). MTA Bölcsészettudományi Kutatóközpont. pp. 133–162. ISBN 978-963-416-212-4.
- Rudolf, Veronika (2023). Közép-Európa a hosszú 13. században [Central Europe in the Long 13th Century] (in Hungarian). Arpadiana XV., Research Centre for the Humanities. ISBN 978-963-416-406-7.
- Solymosi, László (2021). Az Árpád-kori veszprémi püspökök oklevelei [The Charters of the Bishops of Veszprém of the Árpádian Age] (in Hungarian). Martin Opitz Kiadó. ISBN 978-963-9987-89-0.
- Varga, Béla (2009). Veszprém város lexikona [A Lexicon of the City of Veszprém] (in Hungarian). ISBN 978-963-06-7941-1.
- Zsoldos, Attila (2011). Magyarország világi archontológiája, 1000–1301 [Secular Archontology of Hungary, 1000–1301] (in Hungarian). História, MTA Történettudományi Intézete. ISBN 978-963-9627-38-3.

Benedict Genus Rád Born: ? Died: 1309
Catholic Church titles
Preceded by Peter Kőszegi	Bishop of Veszprém; 1289–1309	Succeeded by Stephen Kéki
Political offices
Preceded by Peter Kőszegi	Chancellor of the Queen; 1289–1290	Succeeded by Andrew
Preceded by Andrew	Chancellor of the Queen; 1291–1301/1309	Succeeded by Paul
