= Rád (genus) =

Genus (gens) Rád
- Country: Kingdom of Hungary
- Founded: 997 or 998
- Founder: Vecellin
- Dissolution: 14th century
- Cadet branches: House of Rádi; House of Partasovci; House of Béri

Rád (Raad, Rad or Radi) was the name of a gens (Latin for "clan"; nemzetség in Hungarian) in the Kingdom of Hungary. The kinship descended from Bavarian knight Vecellin, who, based on the narrations of medieval chronicles, played an eminent role in the defeat of the rebellious Koppány in the late 10th century. The kindred belonged to the aristocracy in the 11–12th centuries, but by the 13th century (when the volume of sources increased significantly) became impoverished and politically marginalized.

== Origin ==
Vecellin also came from Bavaria, namely from Wasserburg. Together with St. Stephen, he killed Duke Koppány in Somogy; for he was the captain of the army on that day. The line of Ják springs from them.

— Illuminated Chronicle

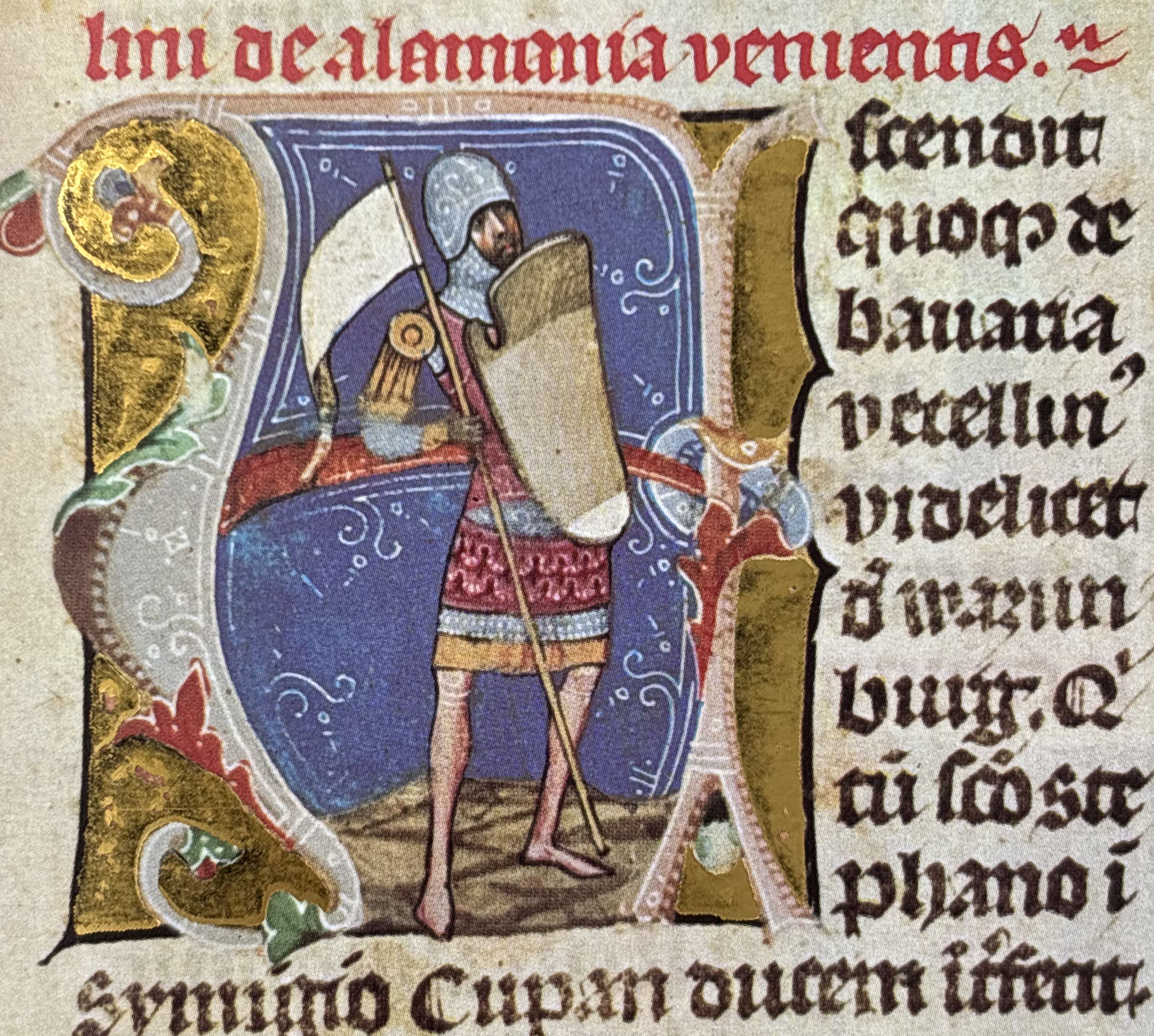
Depiction of 10–11th-century Bavarian knight Vecellin, the ancestor of the gens Rád

The Illuminated Chronicle, which incorporated texts from the 11–14th chronicles, claims that the forefather of the gens (clan) Ják was Bavarian knight Vecellin, who, originating from Wasserburg, arrived in Hungary as a member of the entourage of Queen Gisela in 997 or 998. Commanding the royal army, he played a decisive role in the defeat of Koppány, who contested the legitimacy of Stephen, Grand Prince of the Hungarians. The chronicle also notes that "the aforesaid Vecellin begot Radi, Radi begot Miska, Miska begot Koppány and Martin", The chronicle claims that the famous 11th-century warrior Opos the Brave was also a descendant of Vecellin. Since the text of the chronicle focuses prominently on Vecellin's lineage, historical scholars have long considered that the passages of the Gesta Ladislai regis were written by a member of the Ják kindred, plausibly Bishop Koppány, at the end of the 11th century.

The Benedictine historian Lajos J. Csóka, however, showed that, instead of the Jáks, the gens Rád descended from Vecellin, who had been granted lands in the northernmost part of Somogy County near Lake Balaton after Stephen's victory. Consequently, the clan was named after Radi (or Rád), the son of Vecellin. György Györffy argued that the connection of Vecellin with the Ják kindred was a mistake by the mid-13th-century chronicler Ákos, who interpolated and supplemented the original chronicle text, often erroneously and anachronistically. Elemér Mályusz argued that the chronicler intended to add notable descendants to the knight Vecellin, but by then the Ráds could only be classified as members of the lesser nobility without political power. In addition, Györffy argued that the chronicler Ákos mistakenly linked Opos to Vecellin's lineage because of his father's name, which, however, does not fall in the same generation as the lifetime of Vecellin's descendant, who was the brother of the aforementioned Bishop Koppány. This prelate in the late 11th century descended from the gens Rád; he magnified Vecellin's role in the struggles of the process leading to the founding of the Hungarian kingdom (i.e. the chronicler claims that Vecellin himself executed the rebel) and outlined his lineage. The later chronicler Ákos distorted this text by linking it to the Ják kindred. Through the person of Opos, the powerful Gutkeled clan also wrongly considered Vecellin as their progenitor.

== History ==
=== Heyday ===
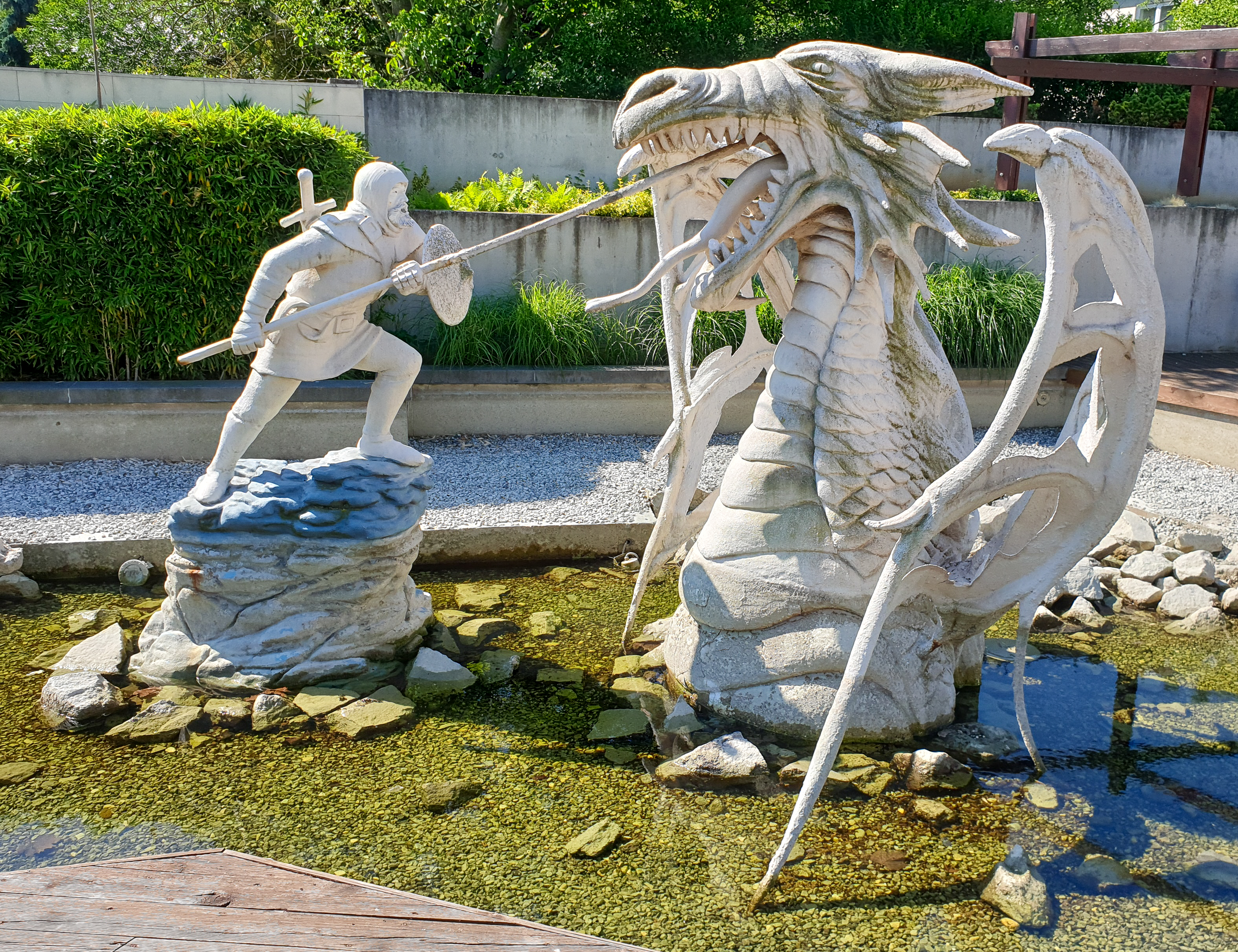
Opos defeats the dragon depicted by a sculpture erected in Nyírbátor

The gens Rád, as one of the most outstanding families, belonged to the aristocracy in the 11th and 12th centuries. However, since this period is poorly documented, the clan's early history can only be outlined in a fragmentary manner. The kinship possessed the lands around the village Rád (present-day Rádpuszta, a borough of Balatonlelle) which lay south of Balatonszemes. It was named after Radi (Rád), the son of Vecellin, after which the entire clan was subsequently named. They also possessed the surrounding villages, including Tard (today a borough of Somogybabod), Visz and Viszló (which possibly preserved a variant of Vecellin's name). Throughout the century, the genus acquired landholdings also in Bodrog, Zala and Borsod counties, and also in Slavonia (primarily in Požega County).

If the reconstruction of Vecellin's family tree is correct, his grandson was that Martin, who fought against the Germans during the siege of Pressburg (present-day Bratislava, Slovakia) in 1052 and also appeared among the testimonies with the title of comes in the establishing charter of the abbey of Tihany in 1055. His son, Opos the Brave – himself a subject of a lost epic poem – was an outstanding soldier in the 1060s–1070; as a supporter of King Solomon, he took part in numerous royal campaigns and fought against the armies of Géza and Ladislaus. His affiliation did not hinder the family's influence: the cleric Koppány served as a royal chaplain in the court of Ladislaus I at least since the early 1090s. Historians Ubul Kállay and Bálint Hóman considered his person as author of the Gesta Ladislai regis. He elevated into a bishopric by the reign of Coloman. He was killed during the campaign against the Cumans in Kievan Rus' in 1099. The names of Miska's sons (Koppány and Martin) illustrated the reconciliation of former antagonisms and their fusion into a fortunate synthesis (the hagiography of Saint Stephen atrributes an important role to Martin of Tours in the defeat of Duke Koppány).

Family tree

- Vecellin (fl. 997–998)
  - Radi
    - Miska
      - Koppány (fl. c. 1090–1099†)
      - Martin
    - Martin (fl. 1052–1055?)
      - Opos (fl. 1067–1074)

In the case of some individuals from the 12th century, it is probable that they were members of the Rád clan. Among them was Andrew, who served as provost of the cathedral chapter of Veszprém but later retired and joined the Benedictines as a hermit sometime during the reign of Béla II (r. 1131–1141). He donated three dozen servants of three villages, Órád, Besen and Karád in Somogy County (all belonged to the lordship of Rád), in addition to three vineyards in Rád, to the Pannonhalma Abbey, which donation was confirmed by King Béla II. Another member of the kindred, lady Színes (Scines) was the first noblewoman in Hungary, whose last will and testament is preserved from 1146. She was the wife of a certain Henry, who himself was the brother of Abbot David of Pannonhalma. In the document, she referred to her relatives and friends as "the elite of the realm", which indicates the high social position of the Rád clan. Being childless, Színes bequeathed her estate Kutas with its accessories in the village Rád (meadows, pastures, vineyards, mansions and serfs) to the Pannonhalma Abbey, with the consent of King Géza II. The document clearly defined the nature of the servants' service, as well as the privileges and obligations of the hospites in the estate.

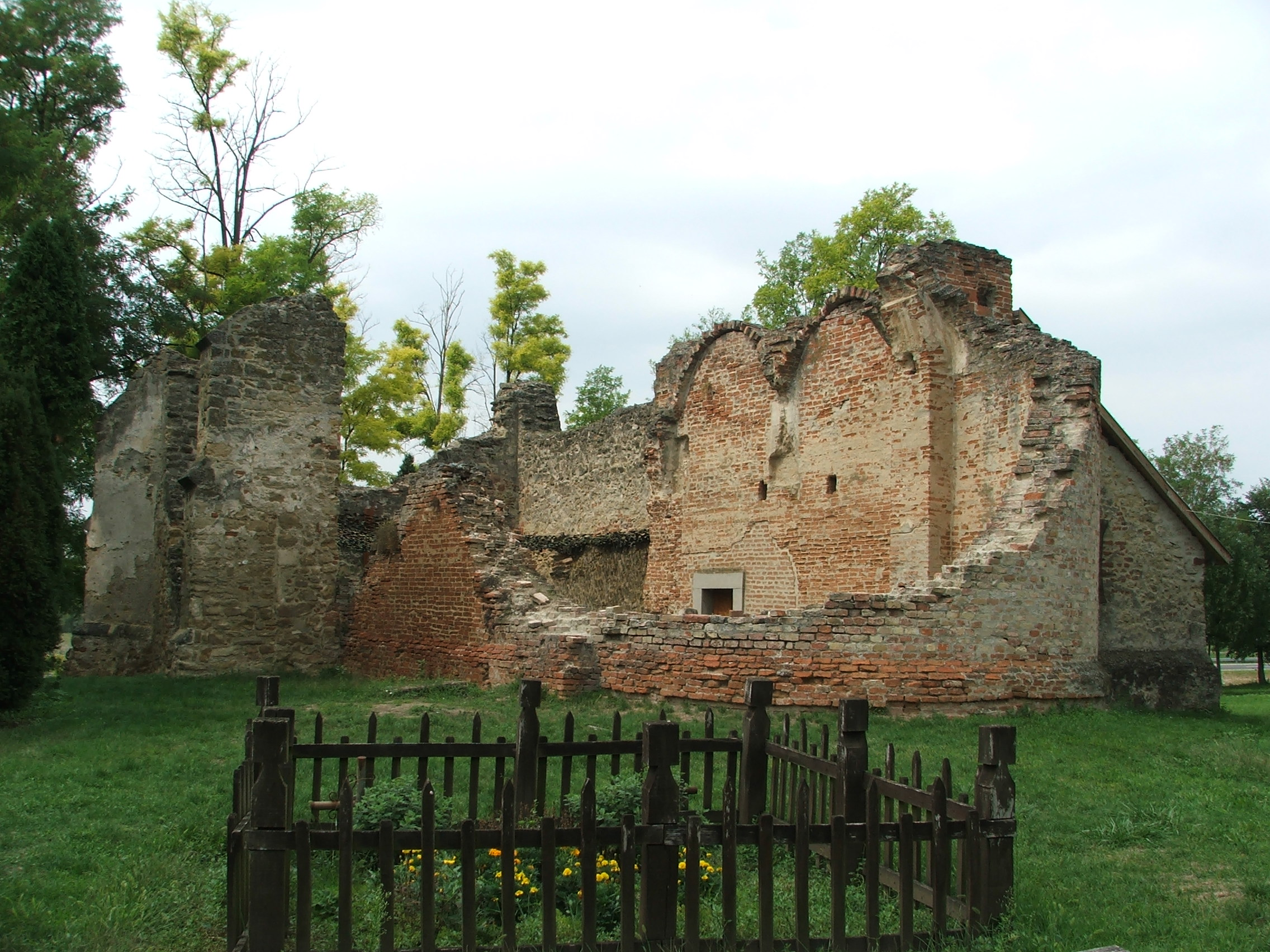
The ruins of the church in Rádpuszta, erected by the Ráds in the mid-12th century

Despite their influence and wealth, there is no record or trace of that the Ráds erected any Benedictine monasteries in the area, perhaps because the Székesfehérvár Chapter and the Pannonhalma Abbey – which also held portions in the vicinity of Rád – served their spiritual needs. The Rád clan maintained a close relationship with the Benedictines of Pannonhalma throughout. Their lands paid the tithes to them, instead of the Diocese of Veszprém. In their eponymous seat Rád, they erected a parish church, whose ruins have survived. Archaeologist Kálmán Magyar considered the church to be of early origin – a Benedictine church under the patronage of Vecellin and his descendants. István Éri, who carried out the excavation and preservation work, dated the construction of the church to the mid-12th century. The church was later, in the early 13th century, extended westward with a wider nave, featuring a gallery supported by two piers and a tower erected above it. Buttresses were subsequently added to the corners of the new nave, a measure necessitated by its vaulting. Finally, in the late 15th or early 16th century, a sacristy equal in length to the early nave was built along its northern side.

During the conflict between King Emeric and his younger brother Andrew, a significant battle took place in the valley of Rád near Lake Balaton, since it lay along the military route in Transdanubia, in the summer of 1199, where the Ráds' possessions were located. There, the royal troops routed Andrew's army; the duke had fled to Austria. During this period, changes occurred in the social order — driven primarily by the rise of the landed aristocracy — with which the Rád clan could no longer keep pace; by the first decades of the 13th century, the clan had become impoverished and lost its significance.

=== Decline ===
It is not always possible to determine the kinship ties between individuals from the 13th century. The fact that various individuals are mentioned in contemporary documents in connection with the sale of estates is a sign of impoverishment. Heym (II), Paul and Denis – the sons of Heym (I) – handed over their 30 iugus of their estate in Rád, along with vineyards and meadows, to the Pannonhalma Abbey in 1255. Radi, son of Emeric sold his portion in Tard to the defendant from Somogy County during a lost lawsuit in 1257. This Radi, along with Cornelius (son of Lucas) and Cornelius' son Conrad (Korlát), "following the example of their ancestors", bequeathed their whole estate Tard with its church to the Benedictines of Pannonhalma in 1261, in exchange for the financial support received from the monastery, and for the salvation of their own souls and those of their ancestors. Another member Ampudin acted as an arbiter in a lawsuit took place in Csicsal around 1270. A late member of the local branch, Mark rented some of the abbey's estates in Rád in 1318, which indicates that his own estates yielded negligible profit. His descendants, known as the Rádi family, followed the same method in the upcoming decades.

The ruins of Kamengrad (Kővár) on Papuk mountain, erected by the Ráds in the second half of the 13th century

One branch managed to maintain a certain level of wealth, establishing a lordship in Požega County in Slavonia. During the early reign of Béla IV (sometime between 1235 and 1241), Thomas, Philip and Lawrence (sons of Chund) carried out numerous diplomatic missions on the king's behalf, especially in the Empire of Nicaea (where from Béla's wife Maria originated). During the first Mongol invasion of Hungary in 1241–1242, they belonged to the entourage of Queen Maria. For their faithful service, they were granted the estates Horsowch, Puzada, Coprina, Blathka and the "land of Fulco's mother" ("terra matris Fulkonis"), which lay at the southern foot of the Papuk and Krndija mountains. In November 1250, Béla IV confirmed the donation to Philip and Lawrence (Thomas was deceased by then). The exact borders of their estates were determined by the officials of Lady Matilda of Požega. The estate Horsowch extended to the peak of the Papuk mountains, where Philip and Lawrence built a castle in the second half of the 13th century, initially called as Crkvenik named after the stream (present-day Brzaja) flowing beside it. The castle was later known as Kővár or Kamengrad. It is possible that Philip served as ispán of Požega County from 1259 to 1266, but historians also attribute this position to his contemporary Philip Kórógyi, also a prominent landowner in the region. Ac a confidant of Queen Maria Laskarina (died 1270), Lawrence held the office of ispán of Požega County at an unknown time too (a charter from 1275 mentions him as "former" ispán). Upon Lawrence's request, King Stephen V confirmed his father's aforementioned letter of donation to him in 1272. His descendants later lived in Partasóc (Partašovac) in the northeastern part of Požega County. They adopted the Partasóci (or Dezsőfi) family name. King Sigismund confirmed Béla's donation letter to Bartholomew and Benedict in 1392, except for the lands Horsowch, which was possessed by Nicholas Treutel as a royal donation together with the castle of Kővár, and Puzada, which was possessed by the nobles of Velika. They became extinct, when the last male member Bartholomew died prior to early 1413. King Sigismund donated their estates to his faithful confidant, Palatine Nicholas Garai.

Seal of Benedict Rád from 1299

The prelate Benedict, who served as Bishop of Veszprém from 1289 to 1309, originated from the clan's Požega branch. Although he referred to Philip as his "brother", it is more likely that he was a cousin or a nephew. In 1291, Benedict complained to King Andrew III that Csák, son of Bágyon (Bagun) from the gens Csák seized the fort of Crkvenik (Kővár) from him and his brothers. The bishop functioned as chancellor of the queenly court from 1289 to 1290 and from 1291 to 1301. Following the extinction of the Árpád dynasty (1301), Benedict supported the aspirations of Wenceslaus then Otto against the ultimate winner Charles I during the era of interregnum. He crowned Otto as King of Hungary in December 1305. He swore loyalty to Charles only during the 1308 diet. Despite the royal army recaptured Crkvenik in the 1310s unification war, Benedict's kinship never recovered the fort for themselves. Benedict's cousin was Stephen, son of Protasius, who bought a land in Vámos and a vineyard in Paloznak, Zala County in 1304. He handed over these estates to the Diocese of Veszprém in 1307, in exchange for Asszonyfalva and five fishponds in Bodrog County. Since it has since been transferred to another owner, his son Leukus requested the convent of Szekszárd to confirm this transaction in 1336. To settle his debts, he sold the estates to the diocese in 1338 for 5 marks. Leukus held his residence in Bér in Tolna County. The Béri family, who descended from him, lived in the region still in the 15th century.

Family tree

- N
  - Chund
    - Thomas (fl. 1235–1242, d. before 1250)
    - Philip (fl. 1235–1250)
    - Lawrence I (fl. 1235–1272) → Partasovci (Dezsőfi) family
      - Desiderius
        - Bartholomew (fl. 1392; d. before 1413)
      - Thomas
        - Lawrence II
          - Benedict II (fl. 1392; d. before 1413)
  - N
    - Benedict I (fl. 1289–1309)
    - siblings (fl. 1291)
  - Protasius
    - Stephen (fl. 1304–1307)
      - Leukus (fl. 1336–1338) → Béri family

== Sources ==
=== Primary sources ===
- Bak, János M.; Veszprémy, László; Kersken, Norbert (2018). Chronica de gestis Hungarorum e codice picto saec. XIV [The Illuminated Chronicle: Chronicle of the deeds of the Hungarians from the fourteenth-century illuminated codex]. Budapest: Central European University Press. ISBN 978-9-6338-6264-3.

=== Secondary sources ===
- Almási, Tibor (1994). "Rád nem [Genus Rád]". In Kristó, Gyula; Engel, Pál; Makk, Ferenc (eds.). Korai magyar történeti lexikon (9-14. század) [Encyclopedia of the Early Hungarian History (9th-14th centuries)] (in Hungarian). Akadémiai Kiadó. p. 565. ISBN 963-05-6722-9.
- Csóka, J. Lajos (1967). A latin nyelvű történeti irodalom kialakulása Magyarországon a XI–XIV. században [The Development of Latin Historiography in Hungary from the 11th to the 14th Century] (in Hungarian). Budapest: Irodalomtörténeti Könyvtár 20., Hungarian Academy of Sciences.
- Engel, Pál (1996). Magyarország világi archontológiája, 1301–1457, I. [Secular Archontology of Hungary, 1301–1457, Volume I] (in Hungarian). História, MTA Történettudományi Intézete. ISBN 963-8312-44-0.
- Györffy, György (1993). "Az Árpád-kori magyar krónikák [Hungarian Chronicles of the Árpádian Age]". Századok (in Hungarian). 127 (3–4). Magyar Történelmi Társulat: 391–412. ISSN 0039-8098.
- Karácsonyi, János (1900). A magyar nemzetségek a XIV. század közepéig. [The Hungarian genera until the middle of the 14th century] (in Hungarian). Hungarian Academy of Sciences.
- Koppány, Tibor (1993). A Balaton környékének műemlékei [Monuments in the Area of Lake Balaton] (in Hungarian). Országos Műemlékvédelmi Hivatal. ISBN 963-7143-30-0.
- Mályusz, Elemér (1971). Az V. István-kori geszta [The Gesta of the Age of Stephen V]. Akadémiai Kiadó.
- Rácz, György (2022). A jáki apátság és kegyurai a középkorban [The Abbey of Ják and its Patrons in the Middle Ages] (in Hungarian). National Archives of Hungary. ISBN 978-963-631-308-1.
- Zsoldos, Attila (2011). Magyarország világi archontológiája, 1000–1301 [Secular Archontology of Hungary, 1000–1301] (in Hungarian). História, MTA Történettudományi Intézete. ISBN 978-963-9627-38-3.
