= Opos the Brave =

11th-century Hungarian knight

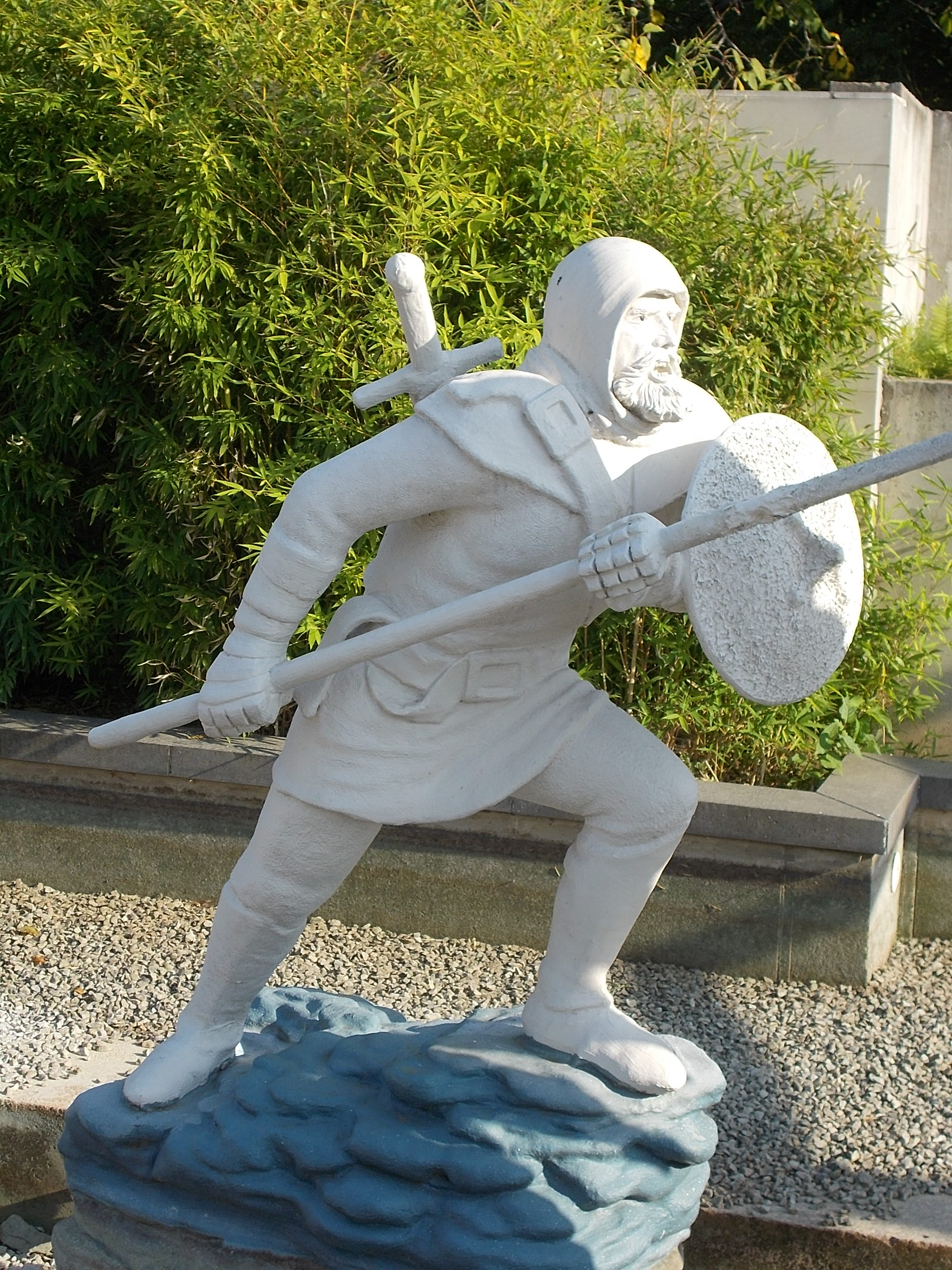
Opos the Brave

Opos the Brave (Hungarian: Bátor Opos, Latin: Bator Opus; died after 1074) was a Hungarian legendary knight and folk hero, who participated in numerous campaigns in the middle of the 11th century. His deeds were recorded by the Gesta Ladislai regis, a near-contemporary part of the 14th-century manuscript, the Illuminated Chronicle, whose author preserved traces of a lost epic poem of chivalresque tradition centered around Opos. Legends arose around Opos including how he defeated the dragon hiding in the depths of the Ecsed Marsh (Lacus Etsediensis), which is the basis for which the notable Báthory family considered Opos to be their legendary ancestor.

== Ancestry ==
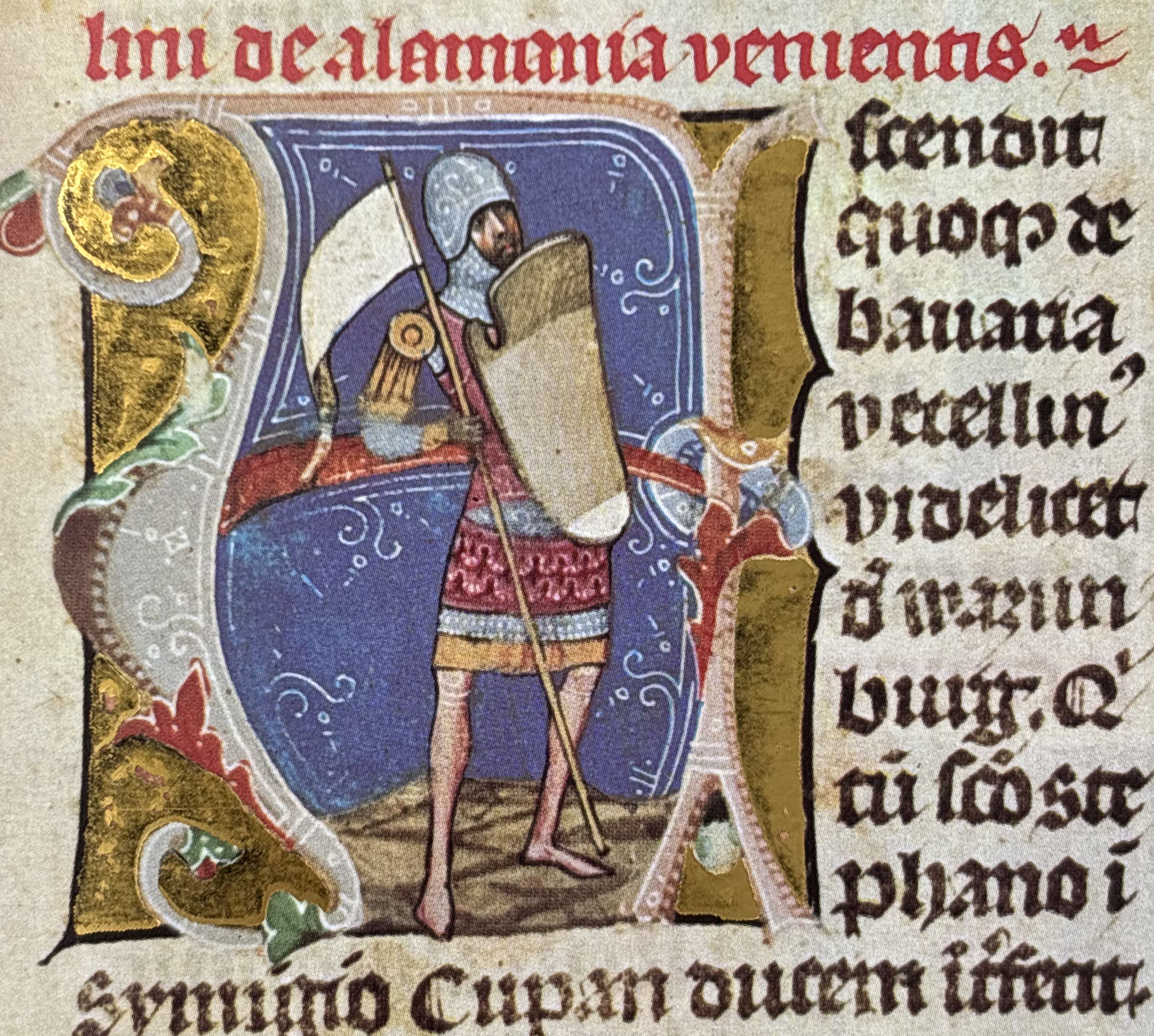
The German medieval knight Vecellin, who was possibly an ancestor of Opos.

The Illuminated Chronicle writes that Opos was "the son of Martin, of the line of Vecellin" ("Opus filius Martini de genere Vecellini"). Other chapters mention the kinship of Vecellin, a German knight from Wasserburg who arrived in Hungary as a member of the entourage of Queen Gisela in 997 or 998. He played a decisive role in the defeat of Koppány, who contested the legitimacy of Stephen I, Grand Prince of the Hungarians. The chronicle also notes that "the aforesaid Vecellin begot Radi, Radi begot Miska, Miska begot Koppány and Martin", and states that the Ják kindred descended from the German knight.

Since the chronicle deals in detail with Vecellin's origins and Opos' exploits, historical scholars have long considered that these passages (the Gesta Ladislai regis) were written by a later descendant, plausibly Bishop Koppány, at the end of the 11th century. Hungarian scholars Gyula Pauler and György Székely both considered that Opos was the great-grandson of Vecellin. The Benedictine historian Lajos J. Csóka, showed that instead of the Jáks, the gens Rád descended from Vecellin, who had been granted lands in the northernmost part of Somogy County after Stephen's victory. Consequently, the clan was named after Radi (or Rád), the son of Vecellin. György Györffy argued that the connection of Vecellin with the Ják kindred was a mistake by mid-13th-century chronicler Ákos, who interpolated and supplemented the original chronicle text, often erroneously and anachronistically.

Györffy also argued that the chronicler Ákos mistakenly linked Opos to Vecellin's lineage because of his father's name, which, however, does not fall in the same generation as the lifetime of Vecellin's descendant, who was the brother of the aforementioned Bishop Koppány. Instead, Györffy proposed that Opos' father was that Martin, who fought against the Germans during the siege of Pressburg (present-day Bratislava, Slovakia) in 1052 and also appeared among the testimonies with the title of comes in the establishing charter of the abbey of Tihany in 1055. Most historians, including József Gerics and György Székely, accept Opos as an historical figure who lived in the 11th century. In contrast, Lajos J. Csóka considered that he was a fictional character who was invented in the 13th century. Gyula Kristó argued that Opos was of common descent because only his actions earned the respect of the "magnates of Hungary", and the descent from Vecellin is a result of the insertion of Ákos.

== Military career ==
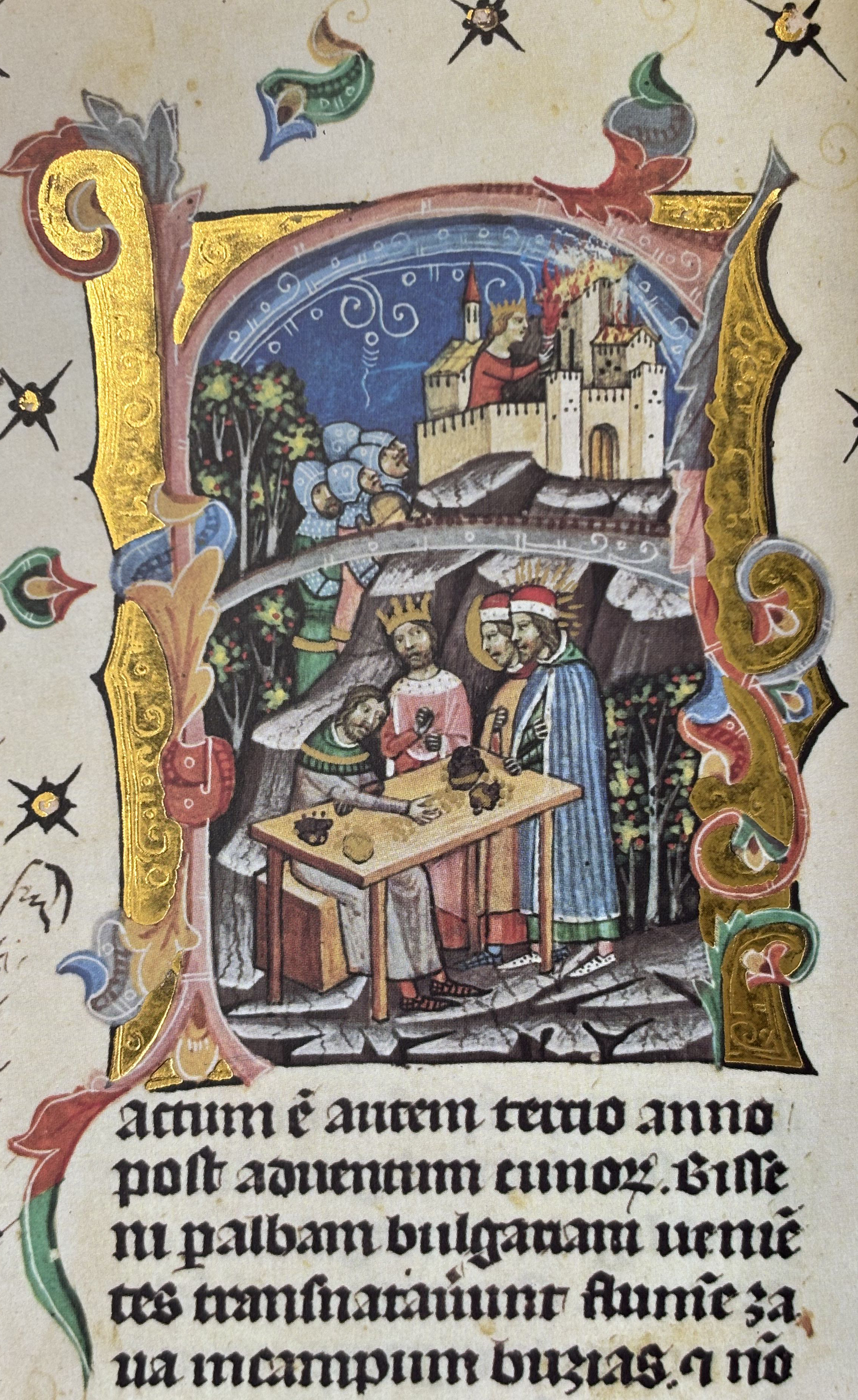
The siege of Belgrade depicted in the 14th-century Illuminated Chronicle

Opos' military exploits took place during the reign of King Solomon of Hungary. He appears as a loyal and steadfast soldier ("miles gloriosus") of the king. The chronicle speaks of him with sympathy and in a positive tone, despite the fact that the manuscript, on the whole, is overtly supportive of Solomon's rivals, Géza and Ladislaus. In addition to the family ties, this also ensures the relatively objective coloration of the chronicle.

In this conflict [the battle at Kemej], Opos, the son of Martin, of the line of Vecellin, who was a soldier of great renown, overcame in single combat a most valiant warrior of the duke whose name was Peter, and who on his chestnut charger rode out in front of the others, conspicuous in his shining breastplate and gilt helmet, challenging the warriors to combat. On his dun horse and in a hooded leather jerkin Opos charged forth alone from Solomon's ranks, and hurling himself upon Peter like a thunderbolt he shattered his breastplate with a blow of his lance and pierced him right through the heart. In the same battle Opos wrought such destruction with blow after blow of his sword that his right hand became cramped with the repetition of the blows and cleaved to the hilt of his sword. King Solomon and especially the Germans marveled at the power and audacity of Opos in battle.

— Illuminated Chronicle

His name "Opus" first appears in the 101st chapter of the chronicle. It narrates that in 1067, the Bohemians broke into Hungary and plundered the region of Trencsén (present-day Trenčín, Slovakia). In response, Solomon and his cousins, dukes Géza and Ladislaus, launched a retaliatory campaign into Bohemia in which Opos participated. There, Opos defeated a giant Czech warrior in a duel, stating: "for which memorable deed he was ever after held in high honor by the king and all the magnates of Hungary". The description of Opos' deed reflects the establishment of the chivalrous tradition in Hungary in the second half of the 11th century. The chronicler's style displays characteristics of the medieval chansons de geste. As a result of his victorious duel, Opos earned the epithet of "the Brave" (bátor or bator; the Latin chronicle preserved the nickname in its Hungarian form).

Opos was also present at the siege of Belgrade in 1071, which occurred during the Hungarians' war against the Byzantine Empire. Opos fought at the foot of the castle wall against the Saracens, who were sent by the Byzantine garrison to break the siege. When three of them broke out of the Belgrade Fortress and caused serious losses to the Hungarians, one of them was killed. When the Hungarians strove to carry off his corpse, the two remaining Saracens fought fiercely for its protection. This micro-scene and the corpse symbolized the outcome of the siege, and obtaining the corpse became of importance for the Hungarian king. Hearing Solomon and Géza's wish and words, three Hungarian warriors, Opos (Obus), George and Bors "rushed forth and leapt upon the Saracens like a thunderbolt. Most valiantly Opos pursued them to the very gates of the city. The defenders hurled stones and arrows from the city battlements, but Opos returned unhurt. Meanwhile George and Bors urged on the Hungarians, who bore off the body of the Saracen and disgraced it". While the majority of historians identified this Obus with Opos the Brave, Gyula Pauler has considered him as a different person.

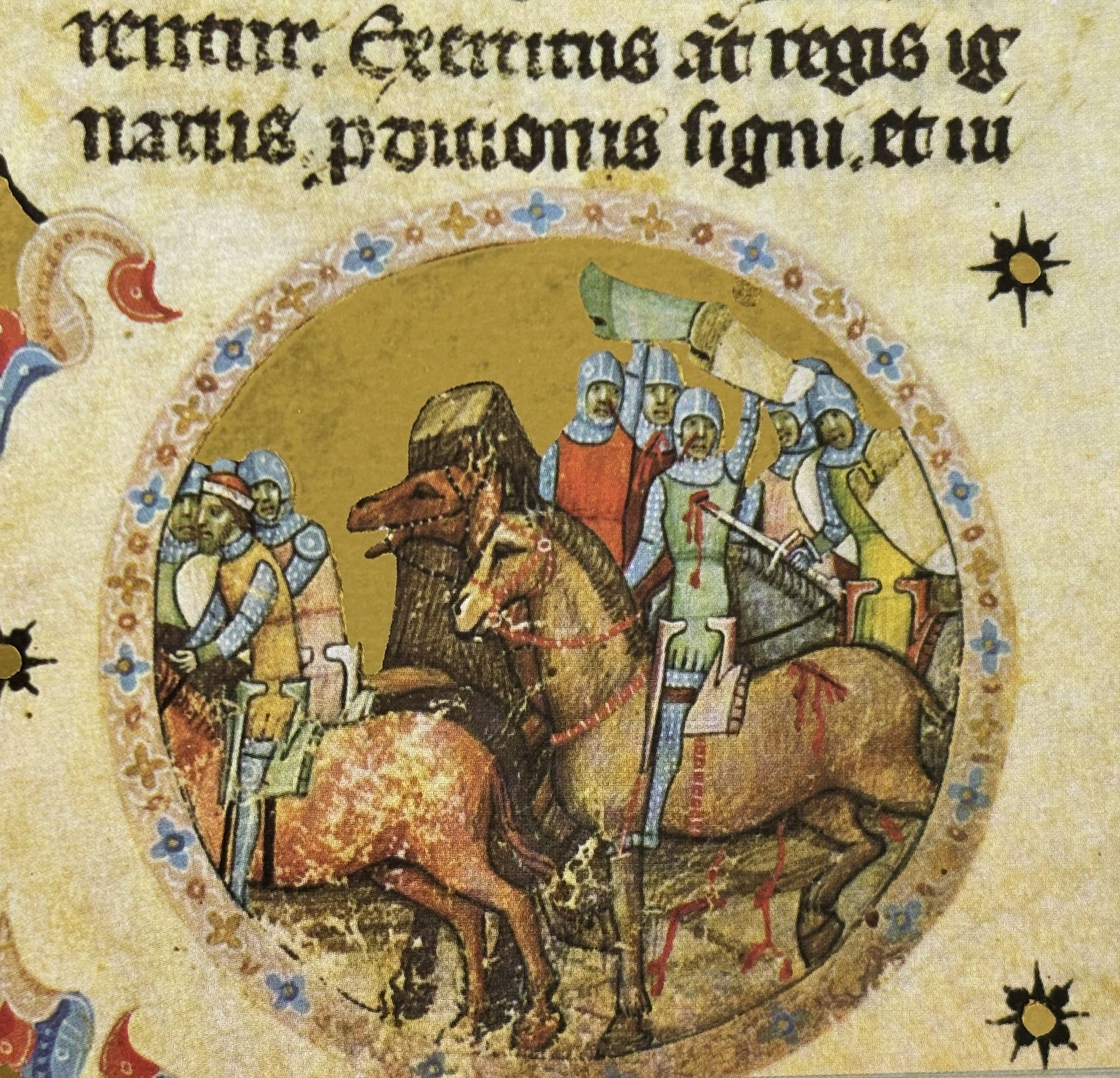
The battle of Kemej depicted in the 14th-century Illuminated Chronicle

After the Byzantine campaign, the relationship between Solomon and Géza had deteriorated. Opos remained a faithful partisan of the king and in this capacity, participated in the internal conflict. He was involved in the royal army, when Solomon – with the assistance of German troops – launched a military campaign against his cousin in early 1074. Opos participated in the battle of Kemej on 26 February 1074, when the significantly superior royal army defeated Géza's troops. Opos actively participated in the skirmish and defeated Peter, from the lineage Gurcu, in a knightly duel. After the victory, the royal army began to pursue Géza towards the interior of the realm. Opos took part in the battle of Mogyoród on 14 March 1074, where Géza and Ladislaus, with Bohemian assistance, achieved a decisive victory. Solomon managed to escape from the battlefield with the help of Opos; they crossed the Danube at Szigetfő, and the dethroned ruler fled to his last remaining strongholds, Pressburg and Moson, in the western part of the country.

While Géza I ascended the Hungarian throne and assumed control of the kingdom, Opos remained in the service of Solomon, who refused to recognize the new monarch. His brother-in-law Henry IV of Germany invaded Hungary in August 1074 to restore Solomon as king. Clashes between the imperial and royal armies took place at the walls of Nyitra (present-day Nitra, Slovakia), in which Opos also participated as a part of Solomon's three columns. The Illuminated Chronicle narrates that "seated upon his horse, Opos, who was a warrior among thousands, charged up to the gate of the city and struck down one of the combatants as if with a lightning stroke. The men of Nyitra bitterly bewailed the death of their comrade, and hurling their spears at Opos, they killed his horse; but he strongly resisted them and escaped unhurt". Returning to the camp, Henry IV "received him into his presence and commended him and praised him highly, and spoke to him sweet and pleasant words". After asking Solomon whether there were such great warriors in the enemy camp, Solomon thoughtlessly answered that "there are many, and even far better", which led to Henry deciding to suspend the campaign. This is the last time the name of Opos is mentioned in the chronicle.

== Folk hero ==
=== Chivalresque tradition ===
The Hungarian historiography has long claimed that the author of the Gesta Ladislai regis inserted and transformed a now lost epic heroic poem narrating the conflict of Solomon and his cousins to his chronicle. This work, in addition to folk tradition, drew inspiration from Homer's Iliad. One of the characters in this could have been Opos, who functions as the story's Achilles. Regarding him, as a frequently usage of epitheton ornans, not only the adjective "gloriosus" recur several times, but the repetition of certain phrases such as "singulari certamine", or "in modo fulguris", can also be observed within the text. The author highlights his personality on every occasion and heaps praise on him. Opos fights on Solomon's side against the dukes, Géza and Ladislaus, and proves to be Solomon's most loyal and bravest warrior; he especially excels in duels.

Gyula Kristó argued that since Opos is a regular recurring figure in the events between 1067 and 1074, a separate epic poem may have been written about him, the text of which was fragmented and dissolved in the text of the chronicle. Opos was a folk hero and his pro-Solomon standpoint perhaps reflects the position of the Hungarian public opinion at the time. In the person of Opos, a brave warrior of incredible strength, an almost mythical "unreal" figure appears. It is possible that his figure represents a hero or heroes in whose person the characteristics of several traditions – Poto the Brave, Botond, and the heroes of early duels – were combined. As Kristó considered, his person and heroism were later appropriated by the ruling class, just like what happened with Botond. In the late 11th or early 12th century, when the Gesta Ladislai regis was written, his character took on a chivalric hue, while in the 13th century, during the expansion of the chronicle, he was given a line of noble ancestry. Lajos J. Csóka argued that the tradition evolved within the walls of the Pannonhalma Abbey in the early 13th century. He connected the origin of the fictional folk character with that Opus (brother of Katl), who bequeathed several estates to the monastery in 1210. Csóka claimed that the Benedictine author of the Hungarian national chronicle expressed his gratitude to Opus with this method.

=== The dragon-slaying legend ===
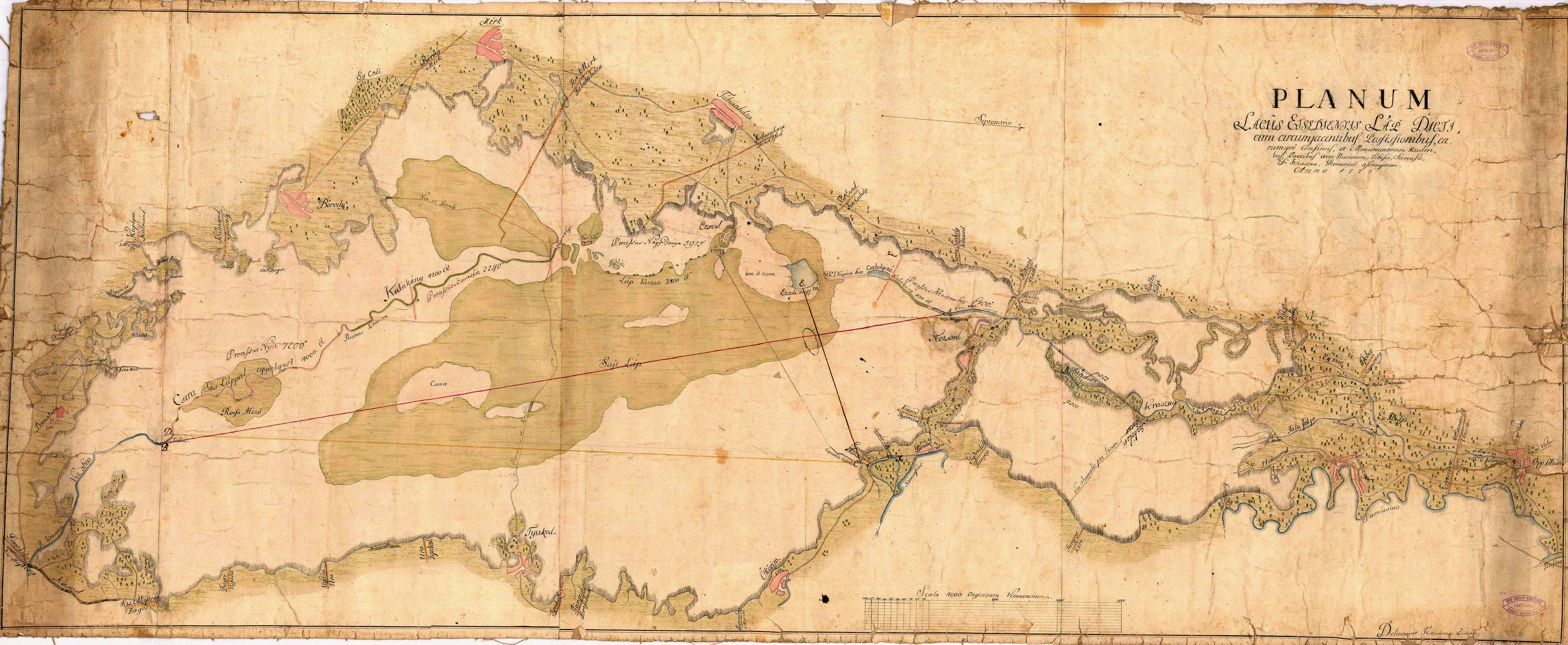
The map of the Ecsed Marsh and its area from 1777. According to legend, Opos defeated the dragon that lived here. The swamp was drained at the end of the 19th century.

By the middle of the 14th century, Opos the Brave became an ideal figure for Hungarian virtue and chivalry. Around the same time, the emerging Báthory family from the powerful gens (clan) Gutkeled became owners of the area of the Ecsed Marsh (Lacus Etsediensis) in the early decades of the century; they erected a castle there (called "Hűségvár", lit. "Castle of Loyalty") and possessed the eponymous Bátor, Fehértó, Pócs, Rakamaz and Nyíregyháza, gradually creating a continuous area around the marsh. A letter of privilege from 1330 confirms that the Báthorys – intentionally erroneously – considered Vecellin as their progenitor, who acquired the aforementioned lands from Stephen I as a reward for his role in the victory over Koppány. The freshly risen Báthory branch of the extended and influential Gutkeled clan sought to retroactively prove their "ancient" origin with this fabricated ancestor. With this act, Opos also became their ancestor, who established the family's reputation with his bravery. In this context, his epithet "the Brave" ("bátor") became the namesake of their centre Bátor (present-day Nyírbátor) and this the name of the Báthory (or Bátori, Báthori; lit. "of Bátor") family. Opos appears as ancestor of the Báthorys in the genealogy provided by 16th-century András Valkai, the court chronicler of Stephen Báthory, King of Poland. His deeds are narrated based on the chronicles of Johannes Thuróczy and Antonio Bonfini. During the wedding of George II Rákóczi and Zsófia Báthory in 1643, Opos is listed among the bride's great and honorable ancestors by the welcome speech, which also narrates his deeds, again based on the aforementioned historical works.

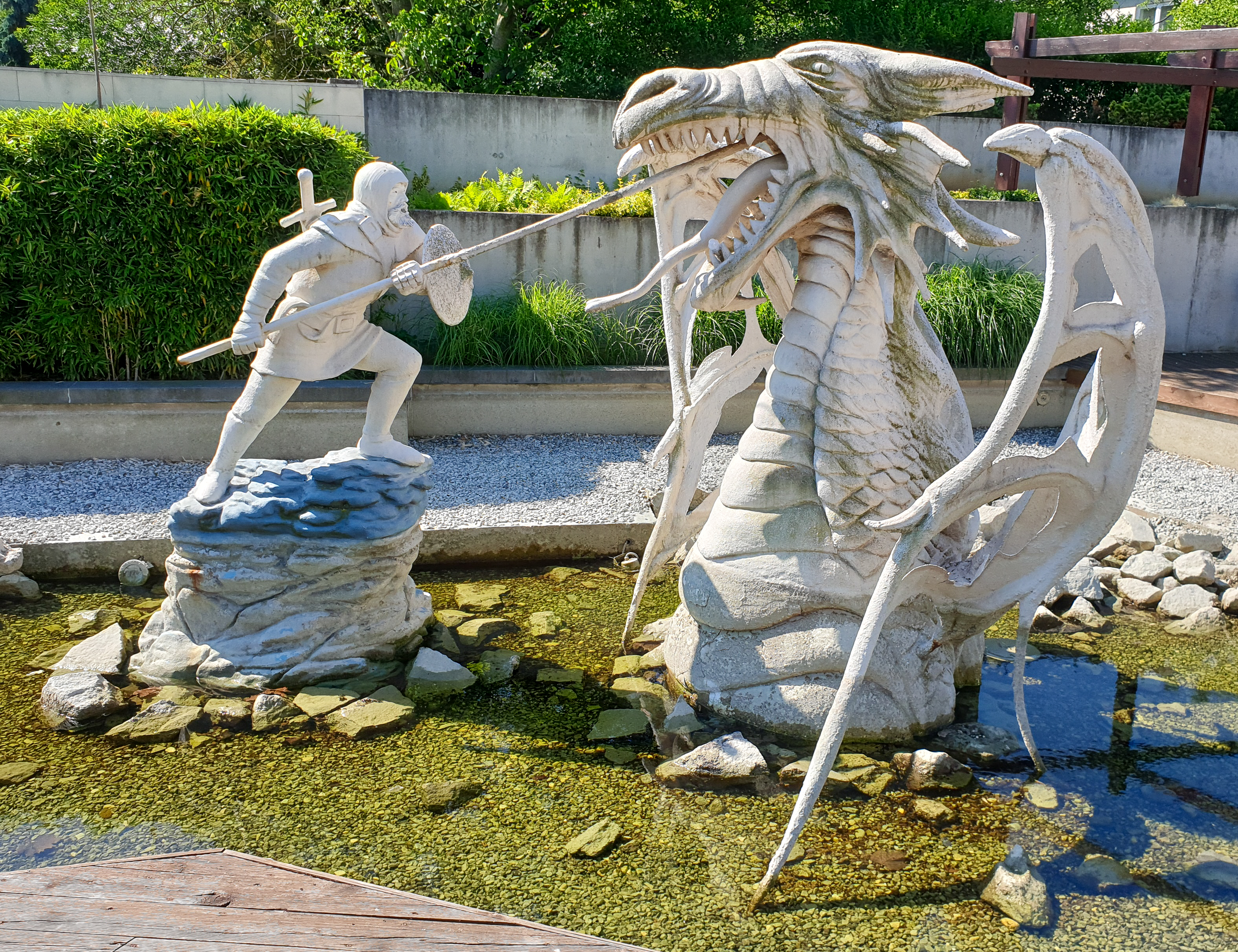
Opos (or Vitus) defeats the dragon depicted by a sculpture erected in Nyírbátor

Folk traditions related to the Báthory family's dragon slaying have been preserved to this day in Szabolcs County. Their roots are connected to the ancient Hungarian mythology, in addition to the cult of Saint George and his popular medieval legend of the defeat of the dragon. According to one of the earliest versions, a certain knight Vitus (or Vid), progenitor of the Gutkeleds, who lived during the reign of Saint Stephen in the early 11th century, defeated a great (anthropomorphic) dragon which nested in the Ecsed Marsh in a large, semi-underwater palace and constantly pestered the surrounding peoples. After the victory, Vitus presented the three teeth of the dragon as proof to King Stephen, who rewarded him and granted him the entire marshland up to the river Tisza. The 17th-century chronicler Farkas Bethlen preserved this variant, adding that the three dragon teeth were included in the family coat of arms from that time on. Several different versions have survived in the Báthorys' various possessions (for instance, Tarpa and Szilágysomlyó), in which the identity of the dragon-slaying hero changes frequently (for instance, Andrew Báthory or Gabriel Báthory). In line with the development of the cycle of legends, the three right side wedges of the Gutkeled (Báthory) coats-of-arms were transformed into "wolf teeth" and then "dragon teeth" during the 15th century.

Coat-of-arms of Elizabeth Báthory, depicting a dragon and its three teeth which was formed based on Opos' dragon-slaying legend

Among the various versions, the figure of Opus gradually emerged as the dragon-slaying hero; this spread was facilitated by the text of the Illuminated Chronicle, which made his name and heroic deeds well-known. Over the centuries, the persons of Vitus and Opos the Brave merged in several variants; it is plausible that Opos' character became usable in the genus' propaganda of the time, while his contemporary Vid Gutkeled, because his intrigues stirred up conflict between Solomon and his cousins, was unfit for this. As a result, the Báthorys tried to legitimize Vid's person with Opos in order to make him usable in the genus' propaganda of the time, and consequently, it is considerable that the original hero of the dragon-slaying legend was Vid (or Vitus), a member of the clan's first generation. Francis II Rákóczi, a descendant of Báthorys, also recorded the legend in his diary: "A branch of the famous Báthory family took its name from Ecsed, and this castle came into my family's possession by inheritance when that family died out with my paternal grandmother. Its coat-of-arms had three dragon teeth, with a depiction of dragon around them. The tradition has always been that when the Scythians settled in the country, one of them from the kindred of Opos killed a dragon on the spot where he built this castle, or rather a manor, because the fortress was not built until a few centuries later. It was then that it was named Bátor. I remember that among the rarities kept in our treasury I saw a mace with which Bátor [Opos] killed the monster. But the smallness of the weapon makes this tradition very doubtful".

Hungarian ethnographer Imre Dankó identified parallels between Opos' dragon-slaying story and the Old English poem Beowulf. Both Opos and Beowulf undertook to destroy the dragon themselves. They came consciously to help and provide assistance to the king and the people of the surrounding area and the country, respectively. This consciously reflects on the foreign origin of the Gutkeleds. Both tales feature specific geographical areas (the Ecsed Marsh and Denmark) and real historical figures (King Stephen and the Danish king Hrothgar). The dragon and their dwelling place, the swamp and the castle built in it, are also the same. In both stories, the heroes must prove the killing of the dragon, for which both kings, as an expression of their own and the people's gratitude, reward them richly. Dankó argued the Gutkeleds, who came from Swabia in the mid-11th century, were familiar of some variants of the legend Beowulf; needed some kind of ideological support, similar to the aforementioned poem, to be accepted and not treated as hated foreigners. Therefore, they adapted the Beowulf legend brought from their homeland, which became widespread and left deep traces in Hungarian historical legends based on its subject, content and tendency.

== Sources ==
=== Primary sources ===
- Bak, János M.; Veszprémy, László; Kersken, Norbert (2018). Chronica de gestis Hungarorum e codice picto saec. XIV [The Illuminated Chronicle: Chronicle of the deeds of the Hungarians from the fourteenth-century illuminated codex]. Budapest: Central European University Press. ISBN 978-9-6338-6264-3.

=== Secondary sources ===
- Csóka, J. Lajos (1967). A latin nyelvű történeti irodalom kialakulása Magyarországon a XI–XIV. században [The Development of Latin Historiography in Hungary from the 11th to the 14th Century] (in Hungarian). Budapest: Irodalomtörténeti Könyvtár 20., Hungarian Academy of Sciences.
- Dankó, Imre (1989). "Bátor Opos–Vid és Beowulf. Angolszász—magyar mondapárhuzam az Ecsedi-láp sárkányának mondájában [Opos the Brave/Vid and Beowulf. Anglo-Saxon—Hungarian Mythical Parallel in the Legend of the Dragon of the Ecsed Marsh]". A Nyíregyházi Jósa András Múzeum évkönyve (in Hungarian). 24–26: 23–31. ISSN 0547-0196.
- Györffy, György (1993). "Az Árpád-kori magyar krónikák [Hungarian Chronicles of the Árpádian Age]". Századok (in Hungarian). 127 (3–4). Magyar Történelmi Társulat: 391–412. ISSN 0039-8098.
- Horváth, Jr., János (1954). Árpád-kori latinnyelvű irodalmunk stílusproblémái [Stylistic Problems of the Árpád-Era Latin Literature] (in Hungarian). Budapest: Hungarian Academy of Sciences.
- Kristó, Gyula (1972). "XI–XIII. századi epikánk és az Árpád-kori írásos hagyomány" [Our 11th–13th Century Epic and the Written Tradition of the Árpád Era]. Ethnographia (in Hungarian). 83. Magyar Néprajzi Társaság: 53–73. ISSN 0014-1798.
- Magyar, Kálmán (1973). "A Báthoriak sárkányölő hagyománya [The Dragon-Slaying Tradition of the Báthorys]". Somogyi Múzeumok Közleményei (in Hungarian). 1: 117–131. ISSN 0139-4983.
- Mikó, Árpád (2013). "Valkai András (1540–1586) Báthory-genealógiája. Báthory István király mint az Árpádok leszármazottja [The Báthory Genealogy of András Valkai (1540–1586). King Stephen Báthory as Descendant of the Árpáds]". Irodalomtörténeti közlemények (in Hungarian). 117 (5): 583–599. ISSN 0021-1486.
- Pauler, Gyula (1899). A magyar nemzet története az Árpád-házi királyok alatt, I. [The History of the Hungarian Nation during the Árpádian Kings, Vol. 1.] (in Hungarian). Athenaeum.
- Pénzes, Szabolcs (2007). "Alvinczi Eduárd tévhite, avagy a Gutkeled nemzetség eredete a családi hagyományokban [The Misconception of Eduárd Alvinczi, or the Origin of the Gutkeled Clan in Family Traditions]". Szabolcs-Szatmár-Beregi Szemle (in Hungarian). 42 (2): 135–153. ISSN 0133-2465.
