= Koppány (bishop) =

Hungarian cleric from the late 11th century

Koppány, also known as Cupan or Cuppan (died 1099), was a Hungarian cleric in the late 11th century, active during the reigns of Ladislaus I then Coloman. Some historians argue he is the author of the Urgesta, the first Hungarian chronicle.

== Ancestry ==
According to a note – "The aforesaid Vecellin begot Radi, Radi begot Miska, Miska begot Koppány and Martin" – from the 14th-century Illuminated Chronicle, Koppány was a great-grandson of German knight Vecelin of Wasserburg, who, in 997 or 998, played a decisive role in the defeat of Koppány, who contested the legitimacy of Stephen I, Grand Prince of the Hungarians. Koppány's father was a certain Miska (Michael or Mika). He had a brother Martin. The chronicle also states that the gens (clan) Ják descended from Vecelin, thus Koppány also belonged to this kindred, as it was first identified by historian János Karácsonyi.

However, Benedictine historian Lajos J. Csóka proved that, instead of the Jáks, the gens Rád descended from Vecelin, who was granted lands in the northernmost part of Somogy County after Stephen's victory. Consequently, the clan was named after Radi (or Rád), the son of Vecelin. György Györffy agreed that the connection of Vecelin with the Ják kindred was a mistake by mid-13th-century chronicler Ákos, who interpolated and supplemented the original chronicle text, often erroneously and anachronistically. Thus, historiography considered that the cleric Koppány belonged to the gens Rád.

== Career ==
Koppány started his ecclesiastical career as one of the influential royal chaplains of Ladislaus I. According to a 1134 judgment letter by Felician, Archbishop of Esztergom, which recounts in detail the foundation of the Diocese of Zagreb around 1090, Koppány took part in the process alongside Fancica. He was entrusted by King Ladislaus to donate the village of Dubrava (Dombró) with its people, lands and forests to the newly erected diocese. Koppány was also present at the consecration of the Somogyvár Abbey in 1091. His name also appears in that forged diploma, according to which Ladislaus I allegedly listed the assets of the Tihany Abbey in 1092.

Based on the aforementioned genealogical note, historian Ubul Kállay argued that the first Hungarian chronicle, also known as Urgesta or Gesta Ungarorum, whose text was preserved by the so-called 14th-century chronicle composition (including the Illuminated Chronicle), was compiled by Koppány during the reign of Ladislaus I sometime around 1090, on the occasion of the canonization of Stephen I (1083). Bálint Hóman and József Gerics accepted this identification, while György Györffy also considered that Koppány functioned as an intermediary of the family memory for his contemporaneous chronicler. Accordingly, Koppány magnified the role of his great-grandfather Vecelin in the suppression of Koppány's rebellion in the chronicle text, while other contemporary documents – e.g. the privilege letter of Pannonhalma – do not refer to him.

Koppány elevated into a bishopric by the reign of Coloman. Which episcopal see he administered is uncertain. According to its schematism, Koppány was Bishop of Eger from around 1094 until his death, based on the narrations of 18–19th-century historians István Katona and József Porubszky.

== Death ==
Bishop Koppány, alongside other lords and prelates, took part in Coloman's campaign against the princes of the westernmost regions of Kievan Rus'' in 1099, in order to support Grand Prince Sviatopolk II of Kiev. The Hungarian army crossed the Carpathian Mountains and laid siege to Peremyshl (present-day Przemyśl, Poland), where "two bishops", plausibly Koppány and other suffragan, a certain Lawrence – possibly a bishop of Csanád – were also present. However the nearby Cumans were hired to attack the Hungarians. In the ensuing battle, Coloman's army was soundly defeated. The Illuminated Chronicle narrates that "the Bishops Koppány and Lawrence and many other brave warriors were pierced with arrows and slain", when the Cumans raided the king's camp. In contrast, the Primary Chronicle writes that Koppány (Kupan) perished, when the Hungarians fled and many of them "were drowned, some in the Vyagro and others in the San". The text does not refer to Lawrence. The late 12th-century Annales Posonienses also mentions that Koppány was killed by the Cumans in 1100 (correctly, 1099), but Lawrence's death in the same year is not connected to the campaign.

== Sources ==
=== Primary sources ===
- Bak, János M.; Veszprémy, László; Kersken, Norbert (2018). Chronica de gestis Hungarorum e codice picto saec. XIV [The Illuminated Chronicle: Chronicle of the deeds of the Hungarians from the fourteenth-century illuminated codex]. Budapest: Central European University Press. ISBN 978-9-6338-6264-3.
- The Russian Primary Chronicle: Laurentian Text (Translated and edited by Samuel Hazzard Cross and Olgerd P. Sherbowitz-Wetzor) (1953). Medieval Academy of America. ISBN 978-0-915651-32-0.

=== Secondary studies ===
- Körmendi, Tamás (2012). "A zágrábi püspökség alapítási éve [The Date of the Foundation of the Zagreb Bishopric]". In Bagi, Dániel; Fedeles, Tamás; Kiss, Gergely (eds.). "Köztes-Európa vonzásában". Ünnepi tanulmányok Font Márta tiszteletére (in Hungarian). Kronosz Kiadó. pp. 329–341. ISBN 978-615-5181-69-6.
- Makk, Ferenc; Thoroczkay, Gábor (2006). Írott források az 1050–1116 közötti magyar történelemről [Written Sources of the Hungarian History between 1050 and 1116] (in Hungarian). Szegedi Középkorász Műhely. ISBN 978-963-482-794-8.
- Rácz, György (2000). "A Ják nemzetség és monostoralapításai I. rész [The Ják Kindred and their Foundations of Monasteries: Volume I]". Vasi Szemle (in Hungarian). 54 (1): 7–26. ISSN 0505-0332.
- Sugár, István (1984). Az egri püspökök története [The History of the Bishops of Eger] (in Hungarian). Szent István Társulat. ISBN 963-360-392-7.
