= Poto the Brave =

Poto the Brave was a Bavarian count palatine who fought famously at the Battle of the Theben Pass in 1060. It was there that he won his sobriquet/nickname of "the Brave."

He fought from evening till morning at the Theben and did not give in until Béla I of Hungary had promised to spare the Germans' lives. "Truly he was believed to be sprung from the giants of old," recalled Ekkehard Uraugiensis in 1104. He was remembered in songs as the Vita Bennonis noted around 1090: adhuc notae fabulae attestari solent et cantilenae vulgares.

== See also ==
- Opos the Brave

== Sources ==
- Thompson, James Westfall. Feudal Germany, Volume II. New York: Frederick Ungar Publishing Co., 1928.
