= Ákos (chronicler) =

Hungarian cleric and chronicler in the 13th century

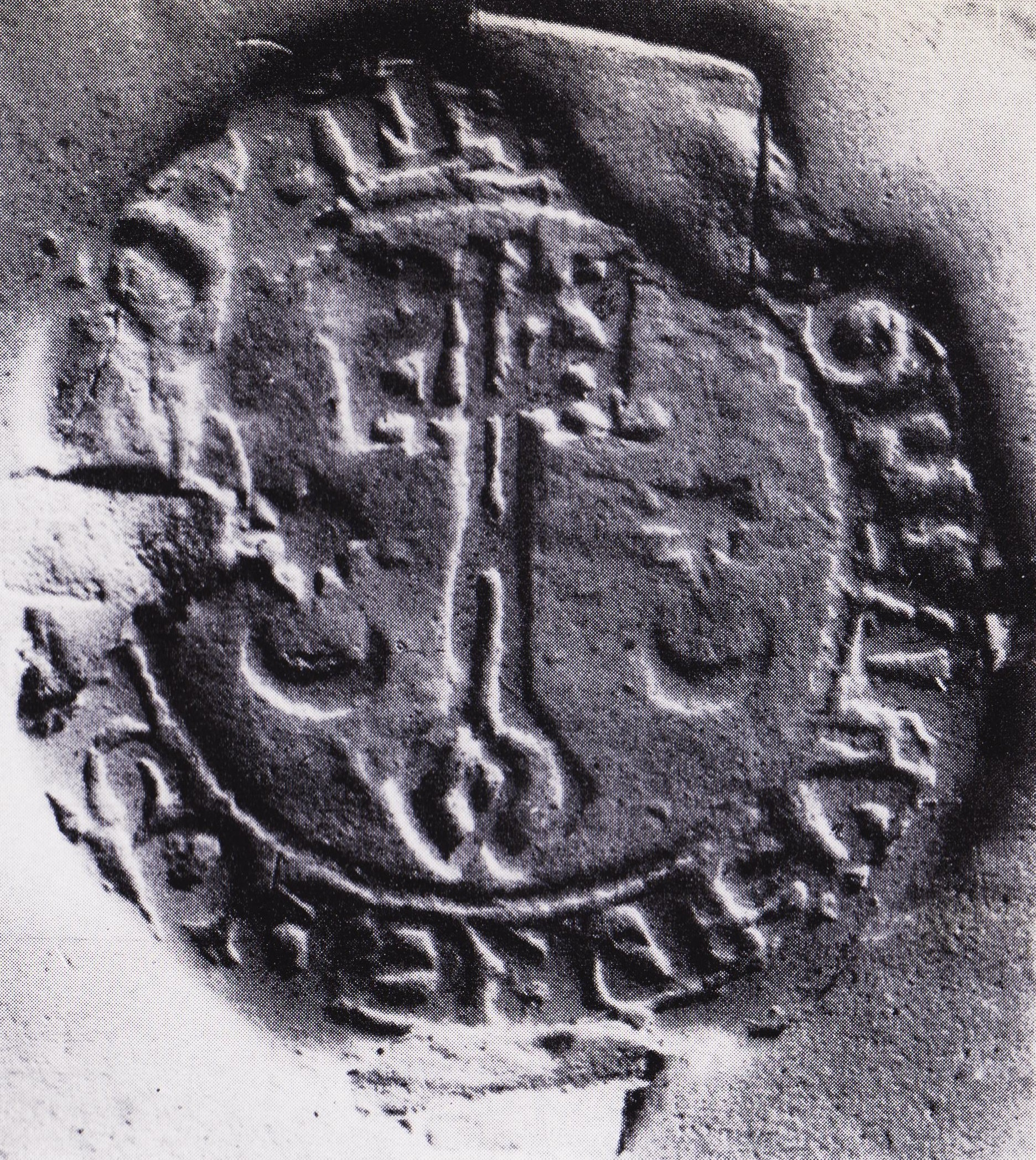
- Seal of magister Ákos, 1266

Chancellor of the Queen
- Reign: 1248–1261
- Predecessor: Philip Türje
- Successor: Mutimir
- Died: after 24 August 1273
- Noble family: gens Ákos
- Father: Matthew

Ákos from the kindred Ákos (Hungarian: Ákos nembeli Ákos), better known as Magister Ákos (Hungarian: Ákos mester) was a Hungarian cleric and chronicler in the 13th century. He is the author of the Gesta Stephani V, which is a redaction, interpolation and extraction of the Hungarian national chronicle.

== Life and career ==
He was a member of the gens (clan) Ákos as the son of Matthew. He had two brothers, Philip, who served as ispán of Gömör (1244), then Veszprém Counties (1247), and Derek, who governed Győr County in 1257. Possibly Ákos, who entered ecclesiastical career, was the youngest brother among three of them. It is possible that Ákos raised in the court of Coloman of Galicia-Lodomeria, a younger son of Andrew II of Hungary. Probably he studied abroad as his work proves that he had an excellent knowledge of the canon law of the Catholic Church and its reference method. Raymond of Penyafort compiled the Decretals of Gregory IX by September 1234, the Pope announced the new publication in a Bull directed to the doctors and students of Paris and Bologna, commanding that the work of Raymond alone should be considered authoritative, and should alone be used in the schools. Ákos was already referred to as magister in 1240, confirming that he studied arts and canon law in youth and not at peek of his ecclesiastical career.

Ákos was present at the coronation of Béla IV on 14 October 1235, as he gave a detailed account of the event in his gesta. According to his report, Duke Coloman carried the royal sword, while Daniel of Galicia led the king's horse at the head of the procession. György Györffy considered that Ákos strongly opposed Béla's early anti-aristocratic reign, who set up special commissions which revised all royal charters of land grants made after 1196 and also had the chairs of the barons burned in the royal council. Ákos was a vicar in Pest between 1235 and 1244, later became royal chaplain for King Béla. He was one of the crown guards from 1246 to 1251, after that he served as canon of Székesfehérvár between 1248 and 1251. Besides that he functioned as chancellor for Queen Maria Laskarina, the wife of Béla IV from 1248 until 1261. He was also provost of Buda. For the last decade of his life, Ákos functioned as caretaker and patron of the Dominican monastery in the Margaret Island. Following the death of Béla IV, he retired from public life and resided in the provost's palace at Óbuda. He wrote his gesta there.

In 1270, after Stephen V's accession to the throne, Ákos was among the members of the Hungarian delegation sent to Naples which escorted the c. twelve-year-old princess Mary to marry Charles the Lame. According to historian Elemér Mályusz, Ákos was the leader of the Hungarian delegation to Naples.

Even after the sudden death of Stephen V in August 1272, Ákos has retained his influence and remained head of the royal chapel during the reign of the minor Ladislaus IV. Ákos died after 24 August 1273, when he was last mentioned by contemporary sources. Benedict, his successor in the position of provost of Buda already appeared in a document in late 1273, suggesting that Ákos died in that year.

== His gesta ==
He was the author of the gesta which was later revised by Simon of Kéza in his work, the Gesta Hunnorum et Hungarorum. In historiography, Ákos was first identified as the author of the gesta from King Stephen V's age by medievalist György Györffy in 1948, while previously Gyula Pauler and Sándor Domanovszky had already referred to an unidentified chronicler between the ages of Anonymus and Simon of Kéza, whose some texts were preserved by the 14th-century chronicle composition. Ákos' work was preceded by a compilator from the 1220s. Györffy realized that the chronicler praised untruthfully highly the past and privileges of Székesfehérvár and Buda, the two churches where Ákos functioned. Ákos' chronicle was mostly based on the so-called "ancient gesta" (Hungarian: ősgeszta) which had lost by today. Györffy considered that Ákos might have used a second, shorter chronicle too (because of the terms "White Cumans" and "Black Cumans"). Ákos inserted a list or catalogue of Hungarian monarchs with their genealogical data to the chronicle text. Beside the interpolations to the original text made by himself, Ákos also prepared an extract for the holy princess Margaret, the Dominican nun and daughter of Béla IV, who was interested in historical works. For her, Ákos made always notices in case of holy kings and martyrs, in which hagiography could have been found a longer story about the lives of the saints, devotional constructions of churches (e.g. Vác Cathedral). The writing of the extract resulted in the subsequent existence of two text versions in the Hungarian chronicle textual traditions, which were expanded in parallel.

=== Purpose ===
Regarding the 13th century and his contemporary age, Ákos only added excerpts to the chronicle, without any relevant information. Györffy argued Ákos was not considered a supporter of the reigning Béla IV, so he could not honestly describe his opinion about the king's reign. Instead, his attention was focused on Hungarian prehistory, since the previous text dealt with the history before St. Stephen to a modest extent. Gyula Kristó argued Ákos, in fact, created a prehistory similarly to Anonymus. Ákos preserved several legends such as Lehel's horn myth and Botond's heroism, later also transcribed by the Illuminated Chronicle, and the Saint Eustace legend with Hungarian motifs and persons, Dukes Géza and Ladislaus. Accordingly, they hunting a stag in Vác, where saw a vision of a burning candle lodged between the stag's antlers. Following that King Géza built the first cathedral in that place. Kristó considered that Ákos invented the Lehel's horn myth in order to offset the heavy defeat of the Hungarians at the Battle of Lechfeld in 955.

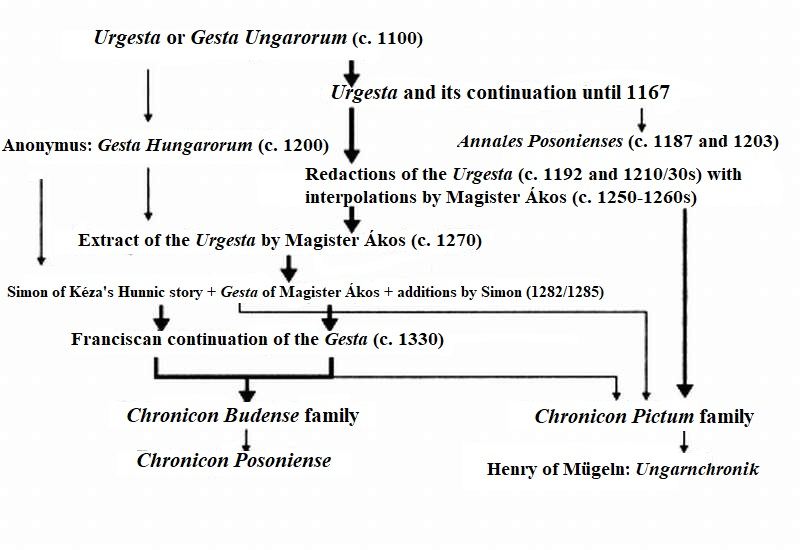
Family tree of the Hungarian chronicles until the 14th century, according to György Györffy (1993)

Ákos' work was aristocratic in its tone, as himself was also a member of a powerful kindred which rose by the 13th century; he prepared the story of seven chieftains of the Magyars which can be found in the 14th century chronicle composition (as Anonymus' Gesta Hungarorum was lost until the 18th century). However, Ákos also emphasized that the ancestors of the kindreds of his age actively participated too in the conquest of the Carpathian Basin in late 9th century, and contrary to Anonymus, he did not identify the seven chieftains with the whole Hungarian nation (Ákos deliberately mixed them with the motif of the seven mutilated "shameful" Hungarians, who returned from the disastrous Battle of Lechfeld). Ákos even emphasized that Árpád was the first "first among equals" who had right to march in front during the conquest – referring duty of monarchs preserved from the "Scythian heritage", he argued. Ákos emphasized that the kindreds of his age – Ákos (his own clan), Aba and Csák – are not inferior to the royal house. According to Kristó, Ákos almost degraded the Árpád dynasty. He considered the various clans chose territories arbitrarily without the need for Árpád's consent after the conquest. During his efforts, Ákos made several anachronistic interpolations: for instance, he inserted "de genere" clauses in the case of 11–12th-century nobles, even though this term only appears in the charters from the beginning of the 13th century. On several occasions, he added the aforementioned genera to the persons, but he also made several material mistakes in the process. For instance, he plausibly wrongly connected Opos the Brave to the kindred of Vecelin. He also used anachronistic terms (e.g. castrum, barones or Beata Virgo) regarding earlier narratives. However, Gyula Kristó attributed this phrases to a pre-Ákos redaction in the early 13th century.

In his work, Ákos called the group of aristocracy of his time as communitas, suggesting equal rights and duties among them, and preventing the emergence of certain clans in their ranks (called barons, which term was refused by Ákos, who used the "nobilis" phrase). Historian Mályusz argued the chronicler's idea of communitas marked an argument for oligarchic form of society, while later Simon of Kéza has extended it to the whole lesser nobility. Ákos sought to link genealogically the prominent kindreds of his age with 9th–10th century individuals who participated in the Hungarian conquest or took a major role in the foundation of the Christian state. For instance, by the usage of incorrectly dated historical events, he claimed chieftain Szabolcs was the forefather of the Csák clan, while he connected the gyulas to the Kán kindred and its first prominent member, Julius I (Gyula). Györffy attributed to Ákos that sentence from the chronicle, according to which Vazul's wife was a member of the Tátony clan, but his marriage lacked legitimacy.

By comparison to Simon of Kéza, magister Ákos did not attach much importance to the xenophobic phenomenon. According to his gesta, he preferred the social status against ethnicity. Ákos considered the advena ("newcomer", foreign-origin) kindreds as equals to the ancient ones. He is the author of the "advena list" (chapters 37–53), which can be found in the chronicle text. In this spirit, he highlighted that the German knights from whom the Hont-Pázmány kindred originated, had already fought for Christ when the Hungarians were still pagans. Rejecting Hont and Pázmány's mercenary role and commoner status, Ákos even claimed that Grand Prince Stephen sought assistance personally in his fight against Koppány from them, claiming members of European "royal dynasties". Ákos also suggested the Hahóts were descendants of the Counts of Weimar-Orlamünde, increasing their importance. Proving the chronicler's ability of historiographical invention, Ákos linked the contemporary ispán Keled's kinship to a fictional 12th century German royal family, the Counts of Hersfeld, even refused by the Kórógyis, later 14th-century members of the family. Ákos possibly intentionally placed the arrival of Héder, forefather of the contemporary Henry Kőszegi and his powerful family, to the age of Grand Prince Géza (r. 972–997), while in fact, the German knight came to Hungary during the reign of Géza II in the 1140s. In other aspects, the magister correctly named the places of the origins of the Hermán, Smaragd and Gutkeled kindreds. Summarizing, Ákos only considered the importance of the assimilation process of advena kindreds, stressing the marriage and relation ties with the ancient Hungarian clans.

Earlier historiography considered that the Hunnic story was inserted by Ákos to the beginning of the chronicle. Sándor Domanovszky and György Györffy argued that Ákos incorporated an existing short historical text into the chronicle, which Simon of Kéza later copied verbatim into his own work. In contrast, Bálint Hóman attributed the Hunnic story entirely to Simon, which he extracted in his own work. Historiography unanimously accepted the latter version.

=== Style ===
Direct borrowings from Godfrey of Viterbo's Pantheon, Roger of Torre Maggiore's Carmen Miserabile and Thomas the Archdeacon's Historia Salonitana prove that Ákos used these works beside the "ancient gesta". According to Györffy, Ákos was well aware of Roman law, which can be understood in action when the chronicle narrates the exile of Prince Álmos with the terms of Roman law. According to literary historian János Horváth, Jr, Ákos' interpolations cannot be classified as stylistically sophisticated passages within the chronicle text, his rhythmic prose is often inconsistent and of poor quality.

According to György Györffy, Ákos was the first chronicler who styled the seven chieftains of the Hungarians as "captains" (Latin: capitanei). He also referred to Lehel, Bulcsú, Vecelin and Apor as "captains", when they led their armies. He also styled King Andrew II as "capitanues et dux preficitur", when the monarch led the Hungarian army during the Fifth Crusade.

== Sources ==
- Engel, Pál (2001). The Realm of St Stephen: A History of Medieval Hungary, 895-1526. I.B. Tauris Publishers. ISBN 1-86064-061-3.
- Györffy, György (1993). "Az Árpád-kori magyar krónikák [Hungarian Chronicles of the Árpádian Age]". Századok (in Hungarian). 127 (3–4). Magyar Történelmi Társulat: 391–412. ISSN 0039-8098.
- (in Hungarian) Kristó, Gyula (1990). Magyar öntudat és idegenellenesség az Árpád-kori Magyarországon ("Hungarian Identity and Xenophobia in Árpádian Hungary"). Irodalomtörténeti Közlemények, Vol. XCIV. Issue 4. MTA Irodalomtudományi Intézete. Budapest. pp. 425–443. ISSN 0021-1486
- Kristó, Gyula (2002). Magyar historiográfia I. Történetírás a középkori Magyarországon [Hungarian Historiography I. History Writing in Medieval Hungary] (in Hungarian). Osiris. ISBN 978-963-389-261-9.
- (in Hungarian) Mályusz, Elemér (1971). Az V. István-kori geszta ("The Gesta of the Age of Stephen V"). Akadémiai Kiadó.
- (in Hungarian) Zsoldos, Attila (2011). Magyarország világi archontológiája, 1000–1301 ("Secular Archontology of Hungary, 1000–1301"). História, MTA Történettudományi Intézete. Budapest. ISBN 978-963-9627-38-3

Ákos Genus Ákos Born: ? Died: 1273
Political offices
Preceded by Philip Türje	Chancellor of the Queen; 1248–1261	Succeeded by Mutimir
Catholic Church titles
Preceded by Andrew	Provost of Buda; 1254–1273	Succeeded by Benedict
