= Zerind the Bald =

Duke of Somogy (debated)
- Reign: before 972
- Successor: Koppány
- Died: c. 972
- Issue: Koppány
- Dynasty: Árpád dynasty
- Father: Teveli (?)

Zerind the Bald (Hungarian: Tar Szerénd; Latin: Zyrind calvus) was a Hungarian lord in the 10th century. According to modern scholars' consensus, he was a member of the royal Árpád dynasty. He was the father of Koppány, the late 10th-century rebellious Duke of Somogy.

== Family ==
Zerind the Bald was the father of Koppány, an opponent of Stephen I of Hungary, according to the Illuminated Chronicle. Koppány's attempt to seize the throne against Stephen I after the death of Stephen's father, Géza, Grand Prince of the Hungarians, suggests that Zerind and his son were members of the Hungarian royal family, descending from Árpád. However, Zerind's exact family connections are debated, because he is not mentioned on the list of the grandsons of Árpád, compiled by the Byzantine Emperor Constantine Porphyrogenitus in the mid-10th century.

According to two historians (István Katona and Kornél Bakay), Zerind the Bald was identical with Michael, the younger brother of Grand Prince Géza, whose pagan name is unknown. They say that Zerind the Bald must have been closely related to Géza, because Koppány's claim to marry Géza's widow, Sarolt, was qualified as an incestuous attempt by 14th-century Hungarian chronicles, but was fully in line with the pagan custom of levirate marriage. Other historians (including Gyula Kristó and György Szabados) write that Zerind the Bald was descended from one of the elder sons of Árpád, Tarkatzus or Jutotzas. For instance, Kristó writes that Koppány's attempt to seize the throne after the death of Grand Prince Géza shows that Koppány and Zerind the Bald were descended from Árpád's oldest son, because Géza (who was the grandson of Árpád's youngest son, Zoltán) should have been succeeded by the oldest descendant of Árpád's firstborn son if the Hungarians adopted customary law similar to the customs governing the succession to tribal leadership among another people of the Eurasian steppes, the Pechenegs.

== Position ==
Some historians (including György Szabados and Attila Zsoldos) say that Zerind the Bald may have been the lord of the land between the Lake Balaton and the river Száva which had been dominated by the horka Bulcsú till 955. Gyula Kristó proposes that he received the territory as a compensation for renouncing his right to succeed Grand Prince Taksony of Hungary in favor of Taksony's son, Géza. If the theory of Zerind's rule in southern Transdanubia and Slavonia is valid, his son, Koppány, who bore the title Duke of Somogy, inherited Zerind's domain. According to another theory, also proposed by Kristó, Zerind may have been Grand Prince of the Hungarians for a while.

The date of Zerind's death is unknown. Historian Gusztáv Heckenast says that he died around 967. György Szabados writes that Zerind may have been murdered by Grand Prince Géza, because medieval legends emphasized that Géza was a cruel ruler.

== Sources ==
- Engel, Pál (2001). The Realm of St Stephen: A History of Medieval Hungary, 895–1526. I.B. Tauris Publishers. ISBN 1-86064-061-3.
- Kristó, Gyula (2001). "The Life of King Stephen the Saint". In Zsoldos, Attila (ed.). Saint Stephen and His Country: A Newborn Kingdom in Central Europe – Hungary. Lucidus Kiadó. pp. 15–36. ISBN 963-86163-9-3.
- Szabados, György (2011). Magyar államalapítások a IX-X. században [Foundations of the Hungarian States in the 9th–10th Centuries] (in Hungarian). Szegedi Középkorász Műhely. ISBN 978-963-08-2083-7.
