= Veszprémfajsz =

- Location of Veszprém county in Hungary

- Location of Veszprémfajsz
- Coordinates: 47.03580°N 17.89603°E
- Country: Hungary
- County: Veszprém

Area
  - Total: 11.74 km^{2} (4.53 sq mi)

Population (2004)
  - Total: 277
  - Density: 23.59/km^{2} (61.1/sq mi)
- Time zone: UTC+1 (CET)
  - Summer (DST): UTC+2 (CEST)
- Postal code: 8248
- Area code: 88

Veszprémfajsz is a village in Veszprém county, Hungary.

== Location ==
Veszprémfajsz is a one-street settlement located at the southern foot of Bakony. It is located alongside road No. 7302, connecting main road No. 77 between Veszprém and Tapolca, and No. 73 from the county seat to Csopak . The nearest settlements are: Nemesvámos (4 kilometers), Felsőörs (6 kilometers), Paloznak (8 kilometers), and Csopak and Veszprém (both 9 kilometers).

== History ==
The current village was built in the 18th century, the medieval village having been located about one kilometer away. Before the Turkish siege of Veszprém castle, the village was depopulated; only the ruins of its church are visible. The patron saint of the church Saint Walburga was a Benedictine abbess.

A part of the population of Veszprémfajsz are descendants of settlers of German origin.

== Mayors ==
- 1990–1994: József Csiba (independent)
- 1994–1998: József Csiba (independent)
- 1998–2002: József Csiba (independent)
- 2002–2006: József Csiba (independent)
- 2006–2010: László József Csiba (independent)
- 2010–2014: József Fertig (independent)
- 2014–2019: József Fertig (independent)
- From 2019: József Fertig (independent)
