= Paloznak =

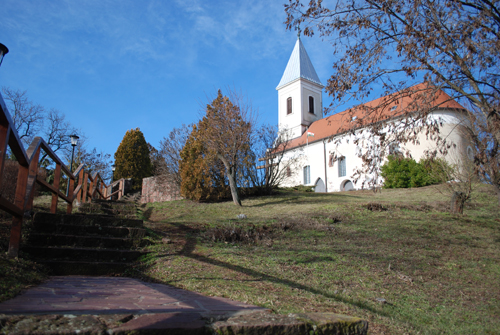
- View of Paloznak

- Flag Coat of arms

- Location of Paloznak
- Coordinates: 46.98368°N 17.94175°E
- Country: Hungary
- County: Veszprém

Government
  - Mayor: Czeglédy Ákos

Area
  - Total: 8.8 km^{2} (3.4 sq mi)

Population (2017)
  - Total: 438
  - Density: 50/km^{2} (130/sq mi)
- Time zone: UTC+1 (CET)
  - Summer (DST): UTC+2 (CEST)
- Postal code: 8229
- Area code: 87
- Website: www.paloznak.hu

Paloznak is a village in the region of Balatonfüred, Veszprém county, Hungary. It was first mentioned in the Veszprém Valley Monastery's Deed of Gift around 970 a. D. According to archaeological findings the place was inhabited since 5000 years. According to the 2001 census, population is about 401 people (2008 estimation is 440). The village is famous about preserving the traditional settlement structure of the Balaton-highlands. Locals make a living from wine and tourism.

== Location ==
Paloznak is located at the northern side of Lake Balaton, the southern flanks of Bakony mountain. The nearby villages are Csopak (from west) and Lovas (from east), the closest city is Balatonfüred. It can be reached on the road No. 71.

== Flora and climate ==
The vicinity of Lake Balaton affects the weather heavily, the local microclimate differs from the highlands': the village is sheltered from the wind, the weather is mild all year. The soil is characterized by clayey sand and red marl, along with red sandstone. In the woods one can find oak, beech, and pine, and in the gardens peach, apricot, almond, and – first of all – grape yield.

== History ==
Archeological research shows that the location has been inhabited since 5000 years. Romans had two villae rusticae. The etymology of Paloznak ('po loznik' means 'at the wineyards' in Slavic language) suggests that the village was populated by Slavic peoples. In 1961, the village became the part of the Alsóörs-Lovas-Paloznak Common Council, but in 1969 Paloznak formed a new Common Council with Csopak. In 1990 the locals formed an independent municipality. In the 1990s the village experienced a lot of developments, new buildings were built, old ones rebuilt while the village maintained and preserved its original style and structure, which was acknowledged by the Hild János Award in 1998. The population of the village is growing, people from nearby cities and even from Budapest choose Paloznak as their new home.

== Mayors of Paloznak ==
- Balogh Lajos 1990-1998
- Czeglédy Ákos 1998-

== Notable citizens ==
- Habsburg Ottó, President of the Paneuropean Union (2000)
- Karl Josef Rauber Apostolic Nuncio (2000)
- Makk Károly film director (2005)

== Sights of Paloznak ==
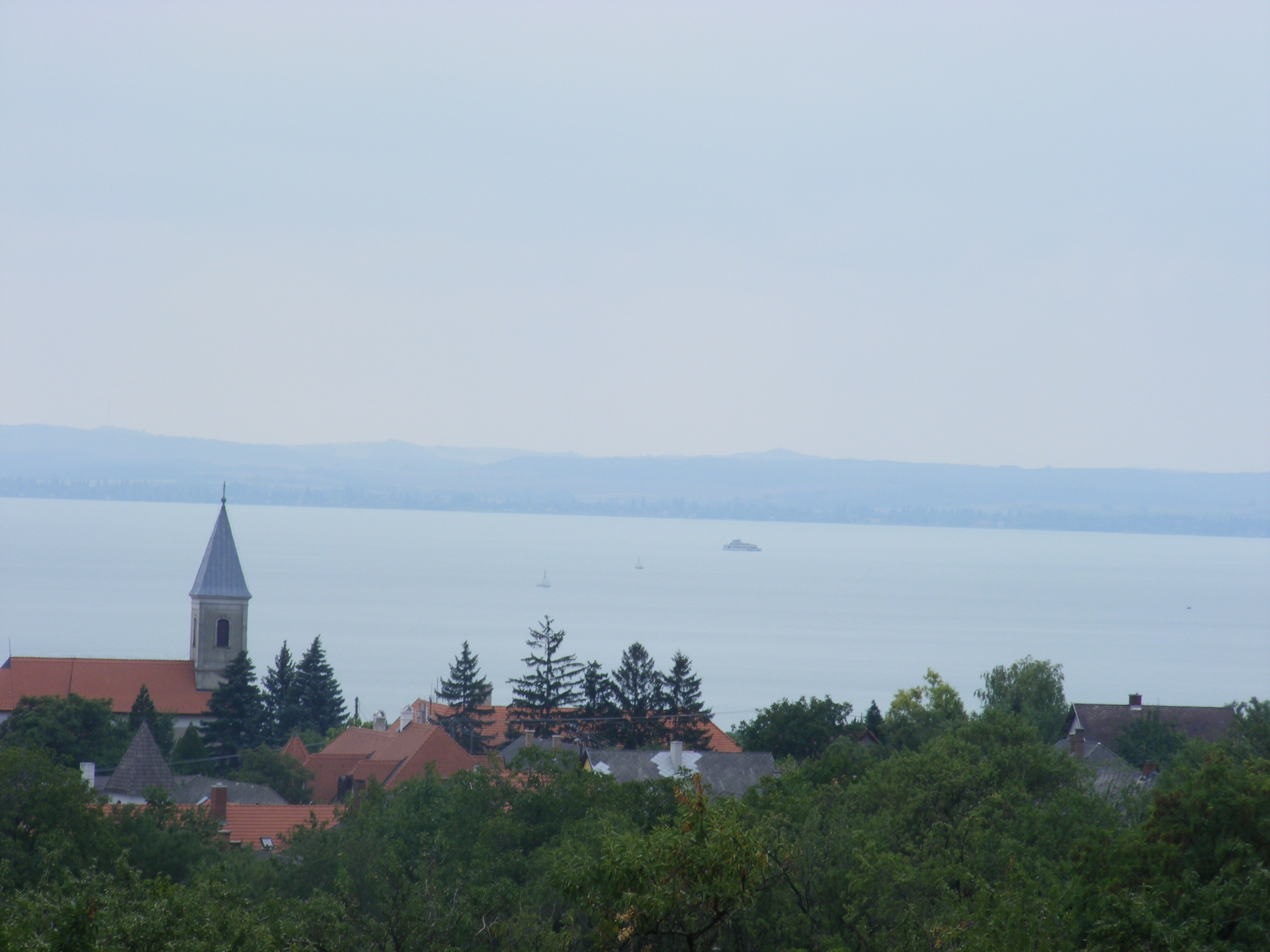
Paloznak and the lake Balaton

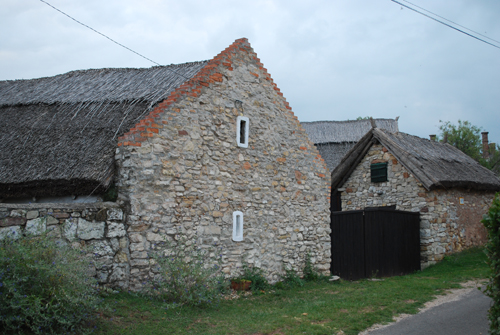
Village houses in Paloznak

- Millennium Park
- Dragon Fountain
- King Ladislaus Sculpture
- Fountain of Heroes
- Saint Donatus Sculpture
- Calvary
- Welschriesling-study path,
- Pongrácz Castle
- Hampasz Fountain
- Antall József Sculpture

== Twin cities ==
- Romania Korond
- Romania Pálpataka (since 1998)

== Sources ==
- Website of Paloznak Municipality
- Czilliné Egyed Ilona: Cultural History of Paloznak
