= Lovas, Hungary =

Lovas
- Flag Coat of arms

- Location of Veszprém county in Hungary

- Location of Lovas, Hungary
- Coordinates: 46.98828°N 17.96072°E
- Country: Hungary
- County: Veszprém

Area
  - Total: 5.95 km^{2} (2.30 sq mi)

Population (2017)
  - Total: 449
  - Density: 75.5/km^{2} (195/sq mi)
- Time zone: UTC+1 (CET)
  - Summer (DST): UTC+2 (CEST)
- Postal code: 8228
- Area code: 87

Lovas is a village in Veszprém county, Hungary. The name Lovas is also a common surname in Hungary.
