= Nemesvámos =

Nemesvámos Cæsariana (in Latin)
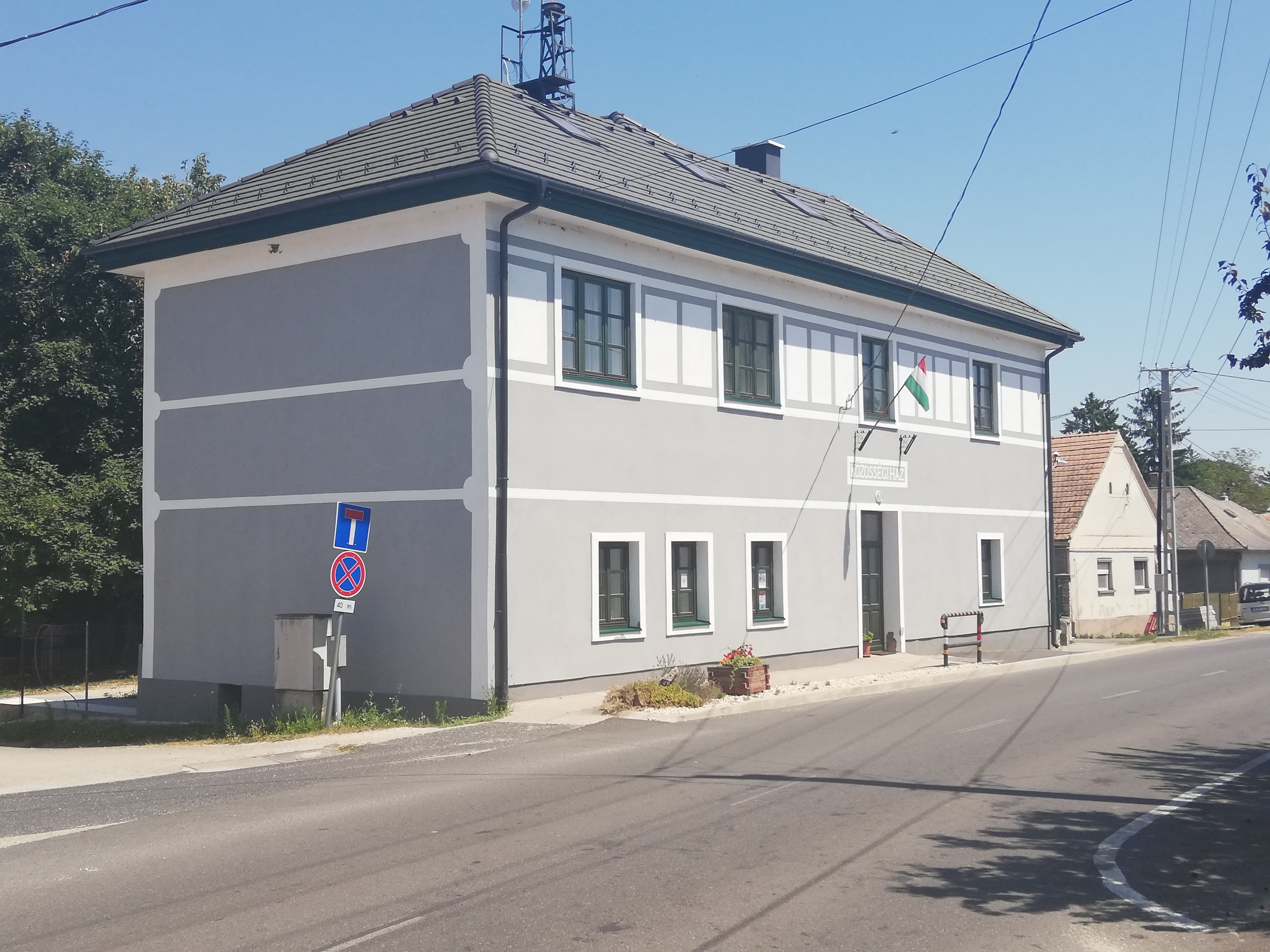
- Village hall

- Flag Coat of arms

- Location of Veszprém county in Hungary

- Location of Nemesvámos
- Coordinates: 47.05368°N 17.87208°E
- Country: Hungary
- County: Veszprém

Area
  - Total: 40.79 km^{2} (15.75 sq mi)

Population (2004)
  - Total: 2,590
  - Density: 63.49/km^{2} (164.4/sq mi)
- Time zone: UTC+1 (CET)
  - Summer (DST): UTC+2 (CEST)
- Postal code: 8248
- Area code: 88

Nemesvámos is a village in Veszprém county, Hungary.
