= Vecelin =

- Count of Wasserburg
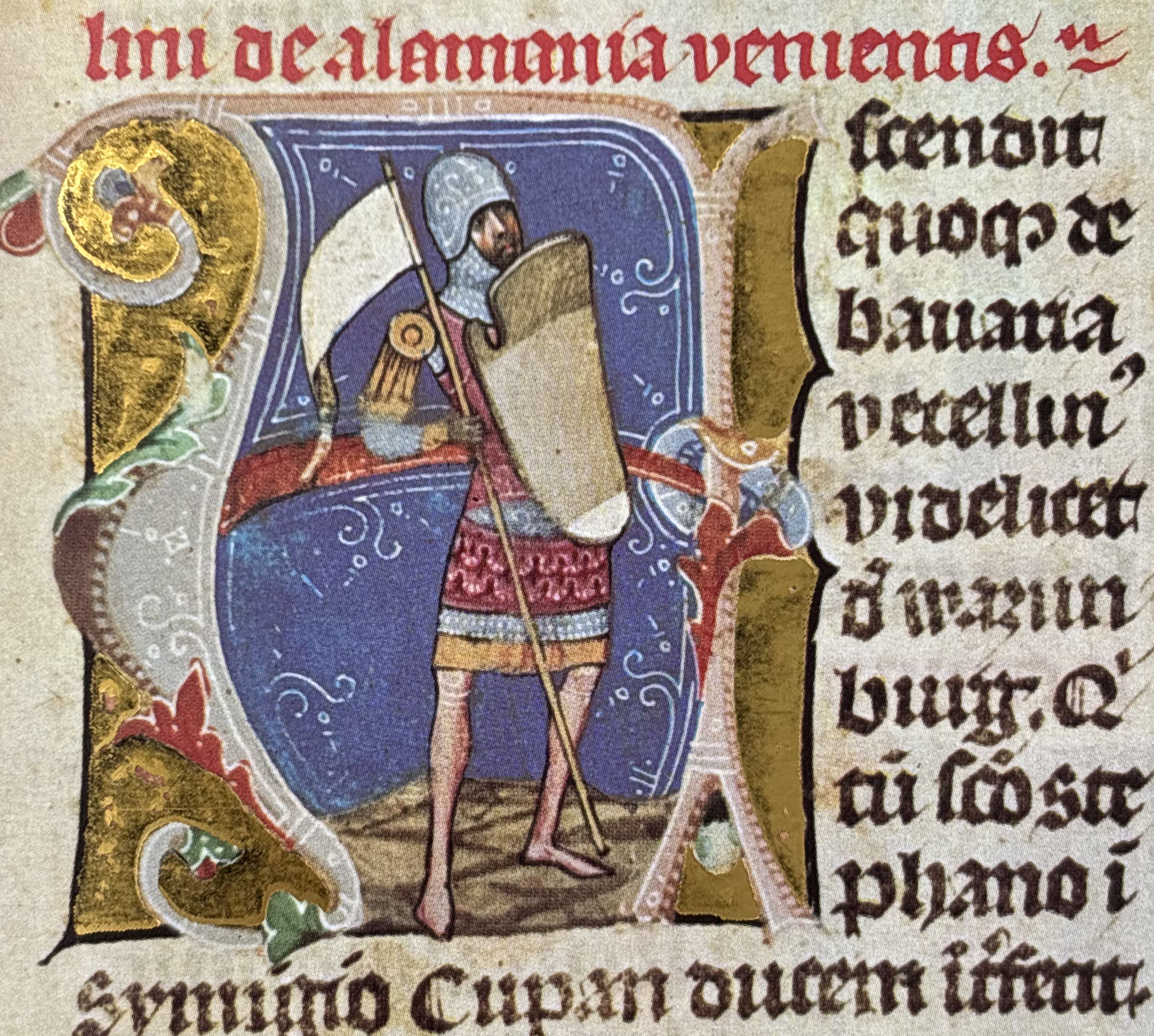
- Vecelin, as depicted in the Illuminated Chronicle
- Noble family: gens Rád
- Issue: Radi

Vecelin, also Vecellin and Vencellin, was a prominent military commander of Stephen I of Hungary at the end of the 10th and the beginning of the 11th century. He was of Bavarian origin and came from a city named as either Wasserburg or Weissenburg.

== See also ==
- Hont and Pázmány

== Sources ==
- Engel, Pál (2001). The Realm of St Stephen: A History of Medieval Hungary, 895–1526. I.B. Tauris Publishers. ISBN 1-86064-061-3.
- Györffy, György (1994). King Saint Stephen of Hungary. Atlantic Research and Publications. ISBN 0-88033-300-6.
- Kristó, Gyula (2001). "The Life of King Stephen the Saint". In Zsoldos, Attila (ed.). Saint Stephen and His Country: A Newborn Kingdom in Central Europe - Hungary. Lucidus Kiadó. pp. 15–36. ISBN 963-86163-9-3.
- Veszprémy, László (1994). "Vecelin". In Kristó, Gyula; Engel, Pál; Makk, Ferenc (eds.). Korai magyar történeti lexikon (9-14. század) [=Encyclopedia of the Early Hungarian History (9th-14th centuries)] (in Hungarian). Akadémiai Kiadó. p. 722. ISBN 963-05-6722-9.
