= Hinduism in Hungary =

The "Om" symbol in Devanagari

Hinduism is a minority religion in Hungary. According to the 2022 census, there were 3,307 Hindus in Hungary (comprising 0.03% of the population).

== International Society for Krishna Consciousness ==
The International Society for Krishna Consciousness (ISKCON) runs the Bhaktivedanta Theological College in Hungary. The Hungarian government donated a building for the Bhaktivedanta Theological College.

Krishna devotees first appeared in Hungary at the end of the 1970s, but only in the second wave of the mission, in the mid 1980s, did a viable community develop.

=== Hare Krishnas in Hungary ===
The leaders of ISKCON mention that there are 8,000 to 12,000 devotees living in Hungary. According to Tamas Barabas (one of the leaders in ISKCON), 190 to 200 devotees live in temples, and 700 to 900 devotees practice their religion seriously. In the four festivals, 9,000 to 10,000 persons gave their names, many of whom go to different Krishna programmes. The biggest ISKCON centre in Hungary is the rural community located in Somogyvamos, a small village in south-western Hungary.

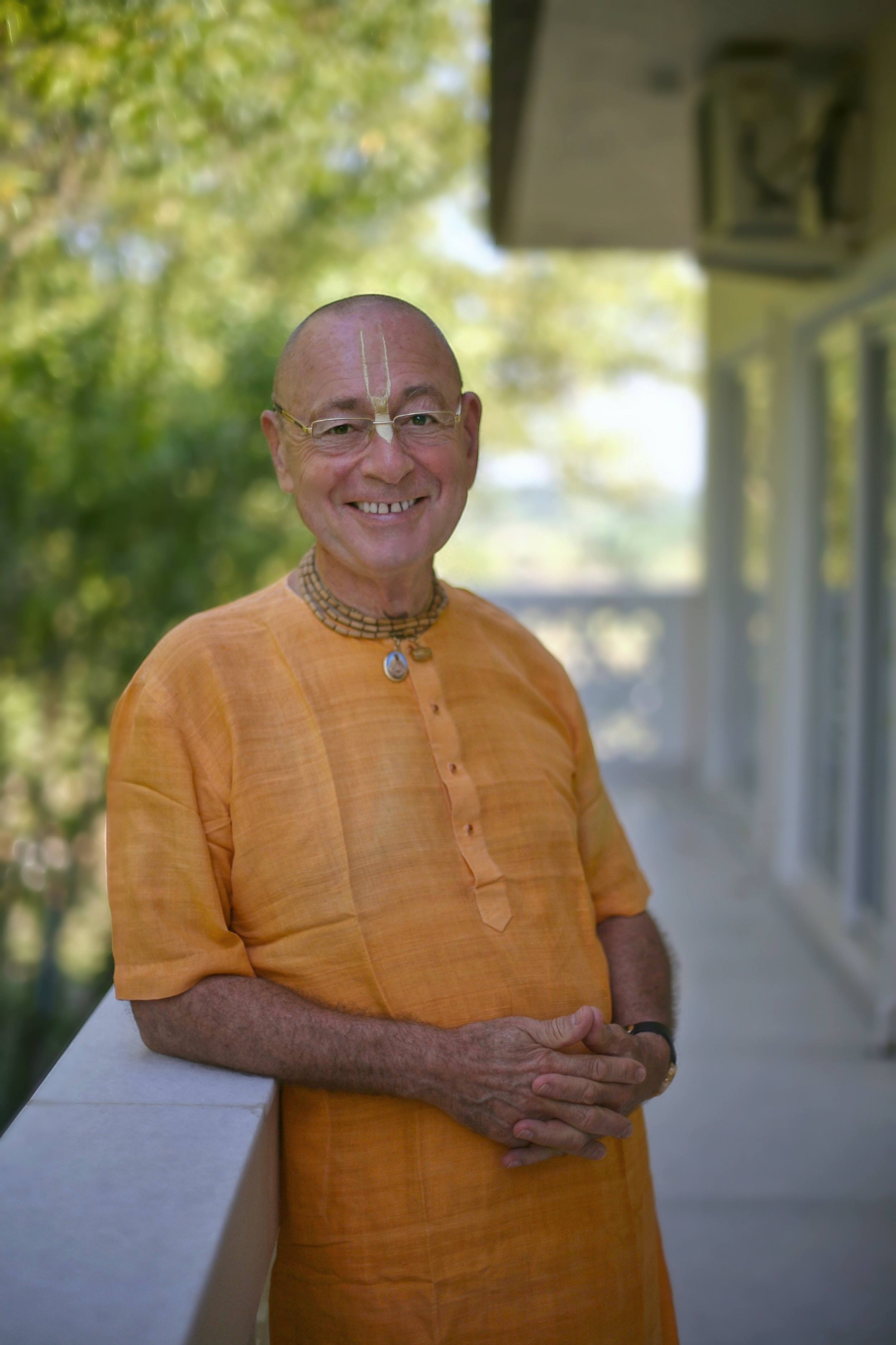
Sivarama Swami

Sivarama Swami is the official GBC representative in Hungary.

=== Hare Krishna centres in Hungary ===
Hare Krishnas have eight centres in Hungary.

== Nandafalva Hindu Temple ==
It is located in the Csongrad County, 19km from the Ópusztaszer National Heritage Park. The temple is a brilliant fusion of Hungarian and Hindu architectural styles .It was architectured by Gyula Szigeti.

It was built in 1979, Swami B.A. Narayan and his followers. Swami B.A. Narayan was sent to Hungary by his spiritual master A.C. Bhaktivedanta Swami Prabhupada. Nandafalva is named after the Indian holy place called Nandagram. After 20 years of activity, the Hindu Temple opened its doors in 2000. The 100 kilo bell residing in the temple tower resounds daily in accordance with Hungarian custom. After of disappearance of the founder in 1993 the community is led by Swami B.A. Paramadvaiti.

== Krishna Valley ==
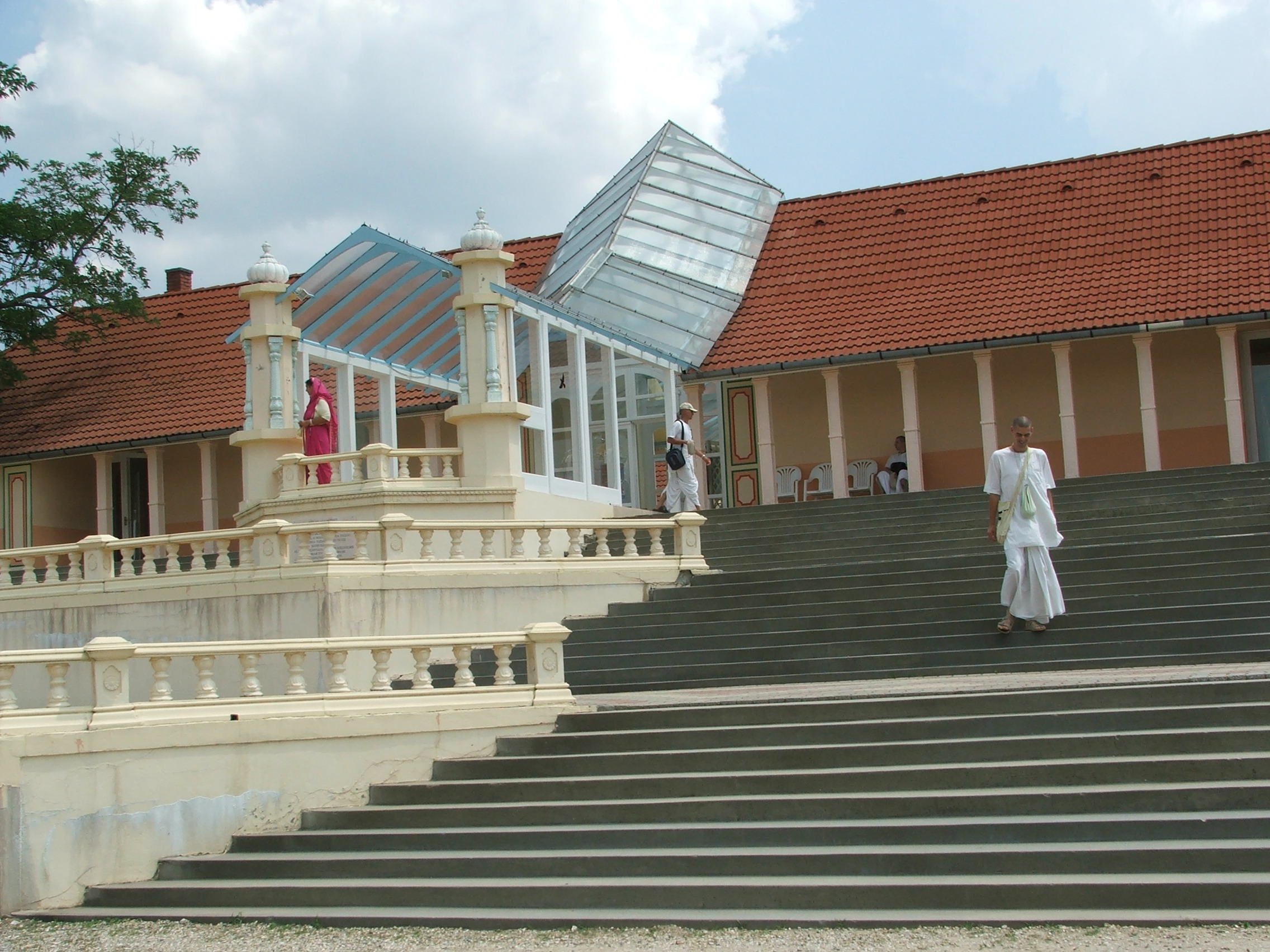
The temple of the Hare Krishnas in the Krishna valley

Krishna Valley is the ISKCON farm in Somogyvámos village in Hungary.It is 660-acre sustainable farm area which attracts thousands of tourists every year. At the moment, Krishna-valley has 150 inhabitants, and there are an additional 30,000 people yearly who visit there or participate at religious festivals. There is also an Eco-School in Krishna-valley.

== Legal Status ==
Since 1989 the Community of the Hungarian Krishna conscious devotees (from now on ISKCON) is a registered religion in Hungary. At their incorporation they registered 50 persons.

The Parliament resolved that Hare Krishnas, Jehovah's Witnesses, The Hungarian Church of Scientology and the Unification Church being 'destructive sects', would not get government support.

In March 1994, the Parliament voted for governmental support of ISKCON and, by this, they withdrew the judgement of ISKCON as 'destructive' and recognised its religious life and charitable work.

In 2011, Hungary's new "Law on the Right to Freedom of Conscience and Religion, and on Churches, Religions and Religious Communities" was enacted and it recognized only 14 religious groups resulting in Hinduism losing its official status. International Hindu organizations in Europe including the Hindu Forum of Europe, the Hindu American Seva Charities, the Hindu Forum of Britain, and the Hindu American Foundation had later expressed their concern about the issue at the Hungarian Embassies in their respective countries, as well as by sending letters directly to Prime Minister Viktor Orbán. In 2012, this law was amended and the list was expanded with the number of officially recognized churches being increased from 14 to a total of 32, which included the Hungarian Society for Krishna Consciousness as a fully recognized church in Hungary.

== Brahma Kumaris Centres in Hungary ==
The Brahma Kumaris has four Centres in Hungary.

== See also ==
- Krishna valley of Hungary
- Hinduism in Slovenia
