= Bakić (surname) =

Bakić (Serbian Cyrillic: Бакић) is a Bosnian and Serbo-Croatian surname. Notable people with the surname include:

- Aleksandar Bakić (born 2000), Montenegrin handball player
- Bojan Bakić (born 1983), Montenegrin basketball player
- Boris Bakić (born 1986), Montenegrin basketball player
- Dušan Bakić (born 1999), Montenegrin footballer
- Jovo Bakić (born 1970), Serbian sociologist, former politician and an associate professor
- Ljiljana Bakić (1939–2022), Serbian architect
- Marko Bakić (born 1993), Montenegrin footballer
- Mike Bakić (born 1952), Canadian football player of Serbian descent
- Milija and Pavle Bakić, co-founders of Galatasaray
- Mitar Bakić (1908–1960), Yugoslav politician, general and People's Hero of Yugoslavia
- Pavle Bakić (c. 1484–1537), Serbian despot
- Sonja Bakić (born 1984), Serbian singer
- Tanja Bakić (born 1981), Montenegrin writer
- Vojin Bakić (1915–1992), Croatian sculptor of Serbian descent

== See also ==
- Bakić disambiguation
- Bakić noble family
- Bakich, anglicized variant
