= Hács =

- Village
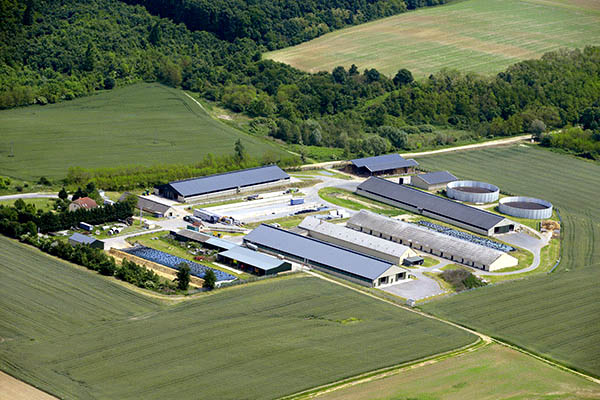
- Agricultural plant in Hács

- Coat of arms

- Location of Somogy county in Hungary

- Location of Hács
- Coordinates: 46.64961°N 17.68701°E
- Country: Hungary
- Region: Southern Transdanubia
- County: Somogy
- District: Fonyód
- RC Diocese: Kaposvár

Area
  - Total: 21.28 km^{2} (8.22 sq mi)

Population (2017)
  - Total: 360
  - Density: 17/km^{2} (44/sq mi)
- Demonym: hácsi
- Time zone: UTC+1 (CET)
  - Summer (DST): UTC+2 (CEST)
- Postal code: 8694
- Area code: (+36) 85
- NUTS 3 code: HU232
- MP: József Attila Móring (KDNP)

Hács is a village in Somogy county, Hungary.

== Geography ==
It lies 14 km (8.7 mi) southern of Fonyód and 6 km (3.7 mi) southern of Lengyeltóti.

The settlement consists of three parts, the former Hács village and two outer uninhabited territories, Béndekpuszta and Gárdonypuszta. The village of Putenda (Petendpuszta between 1849 and 1936) was earlier a separate settlement, but it has grown together with Hács.

== History ==
Hács was first mentioned as Alchy, Béndekpuszta as Bennuk and Terra Bendek, Putenda as Pettend, Gárdonypuszta as Gardon in medieval documents. During the ancient times Germanic tribes and Avars settled there. There were also two villages, Thuul and Sutak on this territory according to the papal tithe register. The second also had its own parish. They all disappeared during the Ottoman invasion.

The landowners of Nagyhács, the Inkey family invited Lutheran Germans to Nagyhács who came from Bonyhád and its surrounding in Tolna County. Originally they came from Hesse and Württemberg to the Hungarian Kingdom. Antal Inkey and his wife, Terézia Kiss made a contract with 30 German settlers which detailed regulated their duties and laws. The first teacher of Hács was Georgius Ritzl who worked there between 1828 and 1858.

The landowners of Kishács, the Lengyel family settled Lutheran as well as Roman Catholic Germans from Veszprém and Tolna County. There were also some Hungarian families in the village.

The landowner of Pettend, Ferdinánd Fechtig settled Lutheran and Roman Catholic Hungarians and Germans in 1849. But according to the records there were also 2-3 Serbian and 1 Jewish family among the settlers.

In 1849 the whole population of Hács was German with 414 people of which 400 Lutherans and 14 Roman Catholics. Four years later, in 1853 41 Lutheran family came to Nagyhács. There was a huge cholera epidemic in 1855 which caused several deaths. In this years the residents built their new Lutheran church and the building of their school. The second one does not exist today. Until 1870 their worships were held only in German, after that in both Hungarian and German respectively on different Sundays.

Zsigmond Inkey changed his lands with Nepomuk János Zichy, therefore became the Zichy family the owner of Hács. There was a huge conflagration in which the half of the houses burnt down. In 1876 the Inkey family established a foundation to spread the usage of Hungarian language among the residents which helped the magyarization. The village became administratively independent on August 9, 1907, from Lengyeltóti. Its first judge was János György Moschberger. Later he was followed by Gábor Ember, Henrik Koch, Kálmán Fűzfa, Sándor Kirner and Mátyás Vogel. In Austria-Hungary at the turn of the 19th century several people emigrated to the United States of America because of the poverty and joblessness. Fifty people left Hács for the US, most of them came back. In 1910 a new Lutheran school was built and the old one demolished. There was also a Roman Catholic school between 1878 and 1953.

Several residents of Hács fought in the world wars. In the First World War died 21, in the Second World War 31. There are two marble plaques on the churches remembering on those who fell. Between the two world wars the village experienced a great economic development. In 1945 the older land system was abolished and all the residents got smaller land portions. The Catholics built a new church in 1953.

On October 26, 1956, the residents marched on the streets of the village and declared their solidarity with the revolutionaries of the Hungarian Revolution of 1956. They elected their own Revolutionary Committee and a new secretary of the village council.

== Main sights ==
- Lutheran Church - was dedicated on October 18, 1936
- Roman Catholic Church - was built between 1949 and 1953 in Neo-Romanesque, was dedicated to Saint Elisabeth
- medieval chapel ruins in Béndekpuszta - was built in the 12th or 13th century in Gothic style. In 1590 Turkish troops attacked the village. The inhabitants flew into the chapel. The Turks set the roof on fire, therefore they all died.
- Classicist chapel - was built in 1857 on the ruins of the medieval chapel
- stone cross - was built on the ruins of a 19th-century chapel in Gárdonypuszta
- fish pond in Gárdonypuszta

== Gallery ==
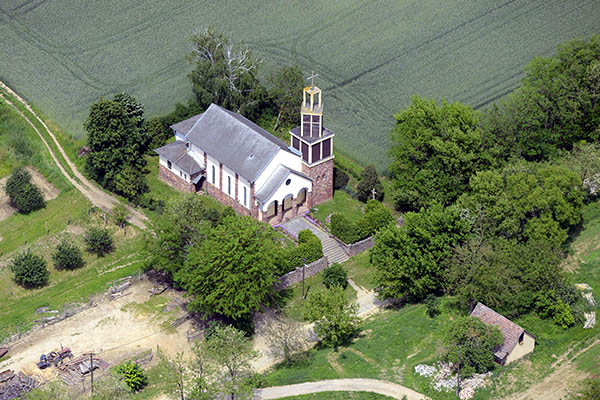

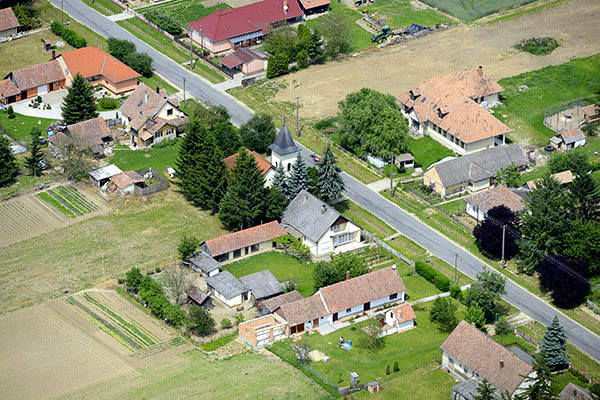

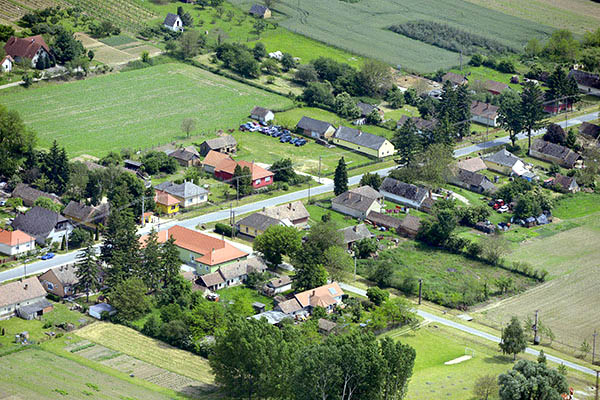

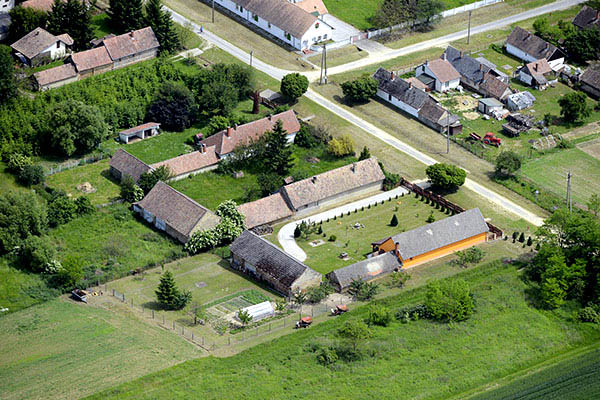

== Literature ==
- László Szita : Somogy megyei nemzetiségek településtörténete a XVIII-XIX. században - Somogyi Almanach 52. (Kaposvár, 1993)
