= Krishna valley =

ISKCON ecovillage in Hungary

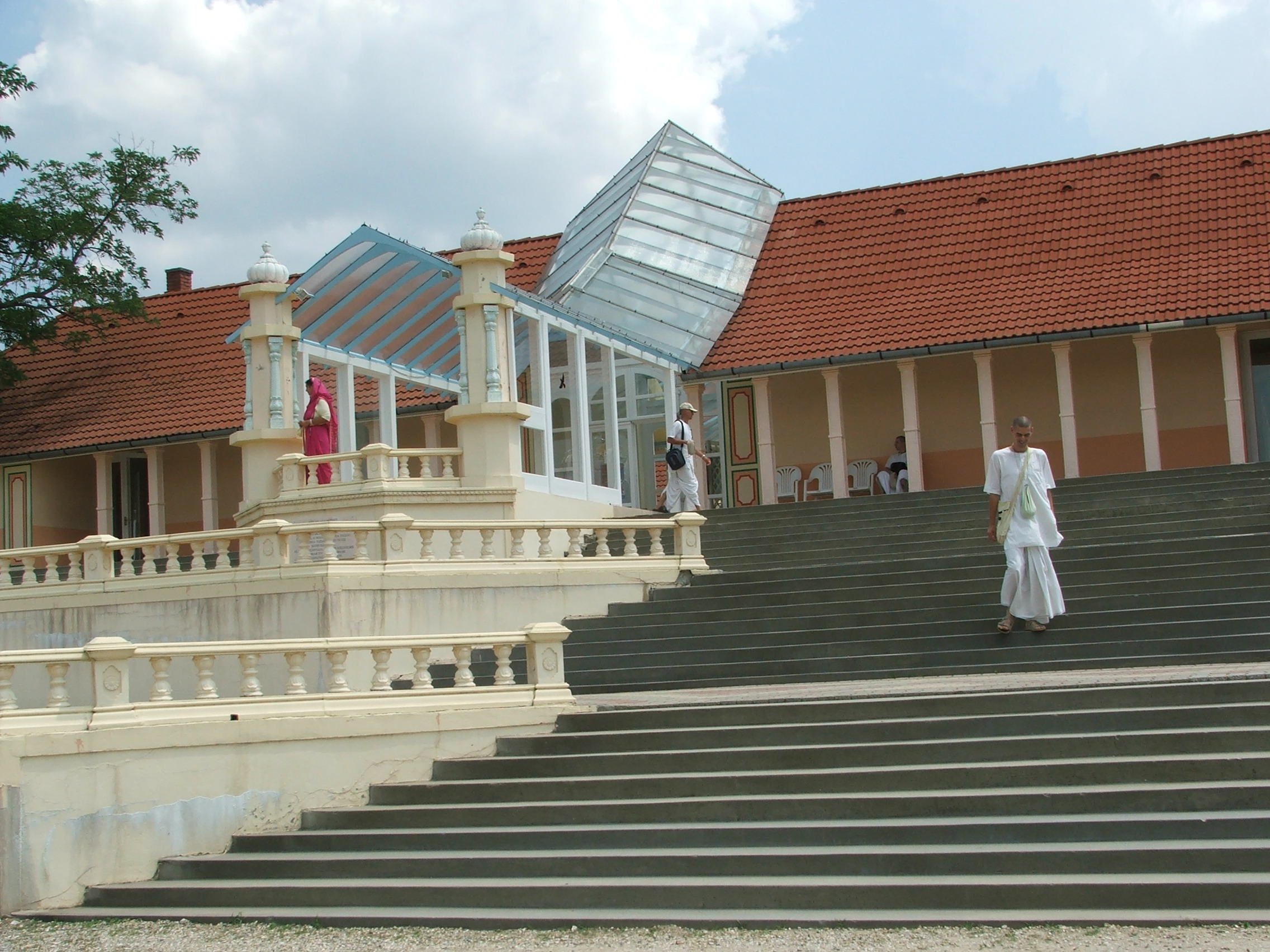
Temple complex in Krishna Valley

Krishna valley (Hungarian: Krisna-völgy), also known within the community as New Vraja-dhama, is an ISKCON ecovillage, Hindu religious community and organic farm in Somogyvámos, Somogy County, Hungary. In a 2021 ethnographic study, Judit Farkas described it as one of the most significant ecovillages in Hungary. The community was established in 1993.

== History ==
Krishna devotees moved to Somogyvámos in the early 1990s. In 1993 they bought 120 hectares of land at auction and began to develop the settlement; the groundbreaking ceremony was held in February 1994. The temple was consecrated on 5 September 1996.

Krishna Valley belongs administratively to the village of Somogyvámos. Farkas wrote that at the time of her study the site covered 266 hectares and had about 130 residents, while additional Krishna devotees lived in Somogyvámos and nearby Somogyvár. By the 2020s, tourism sources described the settlement as occupying nearly 300 hectares.

== Site and activities ==
According to Farkas, the settlement includes residential and agricultural land, pasture, orchards, horticultural gardens, an apiary, a dairy farm, parks, forests, a botanical garden, school and library buildings, and a central temple complex. She also reported that Krishna Valley was not connected to the national electricity grid and relied on solar and wind power, wells, wood heating, and root-zone wastewater treatment as part of its self-sufficiency model.

Tourism sources describe Krishna Valley as both a pilgrimage site and a tourist attraction, receiving about 25,000 to 30,000 visitors a year.

== See also ==
- New Vrindaban
