= Bakić =

Bakić may refer to:

- Bakić (surname)
- Bakić noble family, Serbian early-modern-period nobility
- Bakić, Croatia, a village in Slavonia, Croatia
