= Somogyvár =

Somogyvár Šemudvar (in Croatian)
- Village
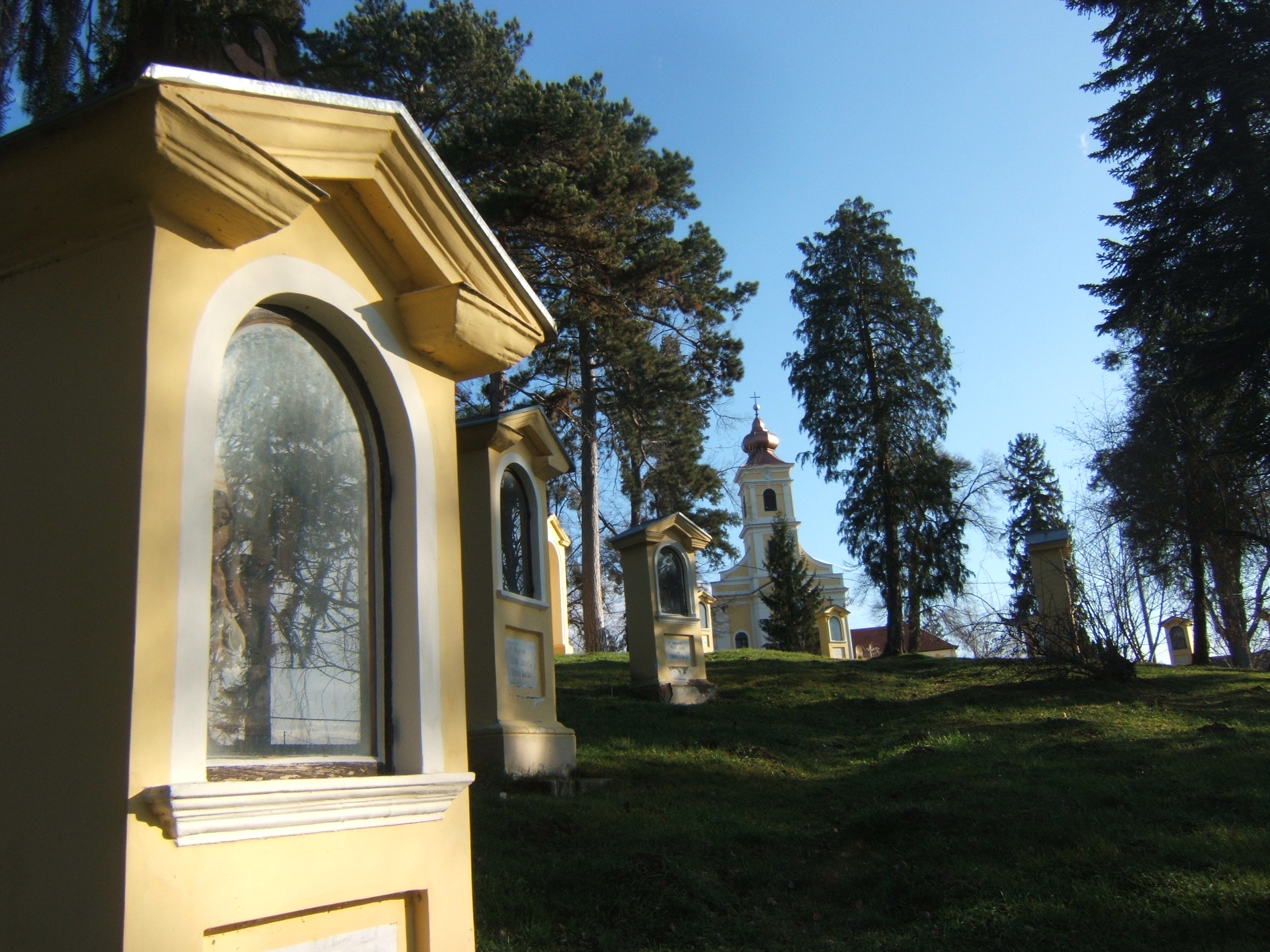
- Calvary in Somogyvár

- Coat of arms

- Location of Somogy county in Hungary

- Location in Hungary
- Coordinates: 46.581°N 17.648°E
- Country: Hungary
- Region: Southern Transdanubia
- County: Somogy
- District: Fonyód
- RC Diocese: Kaposvár

Area
  - Total: 52.99 km^{2} (20.46 sq mi)

Population (2017)
  - Total: 1,684
  - Density: 31.78/km^{2} (82.31/sq mi)
- Demonym: somogyvári
- Time zone: UTC+1 (CET)
  - Summer (DST): UTC+2 (CEST)
- Postal code: 8698
- Area code: (+36) 85
- Patron Saint: Ladislaus I
- NUTS 3 code: HU232
- MP: József Attila Móring (KDNP)
- Website: Somogyvár Online

Somogyvár (Croatian: Šemudvar) is a village in Somogy County, Hungary.

== Geography ==
It is situated south from Lengyeltóti, between Lengyeltóti, Öreglak and Somogyvámos.

== History ==
It is a historical tradition that, after the death of Géza of Hungary, Prince Koppány held this central fortress in the region of Somogyvár.

Koppány launched the attack on the Veszprém fortress in 997 from here. Archaeological excavations revealed that in 1091 King Ladislaus I of Hungary supported the building of a Benedictine monastery here. Excavations also revealed layers that date from before the 11th century in the Bronze Age.

The Somogyvár Abbey was built between 1091 and 1095 and the first Benedictine monks were invited from the Abbey of Saint-Gilles. Later monks were also invited both from France and other abbeys from Hungary. As so often happened to Benedictine abbeys that were located at important locations, the local kings and princes eventually managed to gain control and convert them from monasteries into military fortresses.

The royal fortress of Somogyvár was frequently mentioned in charters from 1163. Sigismund, Holy Roman Emperor gave the fortress in 1410 to Marczali Miklós. Later, in 1474 the Báthori family received Somogyvár town. Then the Enyingi Török family owned it.

The monastery was used till the Ottoman wars in the 16th century. After the battle of Mohács, it was transformed and rebuilt as a fortress. In 1543 the Ottoman army destroyed the monastery fortress.

After the end of the Turkish wars and occupation, in 1677 Széchenyi György archbishop of Kalocsa rebuilt the village and it became the possession of the Archbishop of Kalocsa until the 20th century.

== Economy ==
The Hungarian Fonte Viva company (owned by Mol Group) bottles the local mineral water in the village.

== Main sights ==
- Ruins of Somogyvár Abbey - consecrated in 1091
- Széchenyi Palace
- Szentesica fountain

== Gallery ==
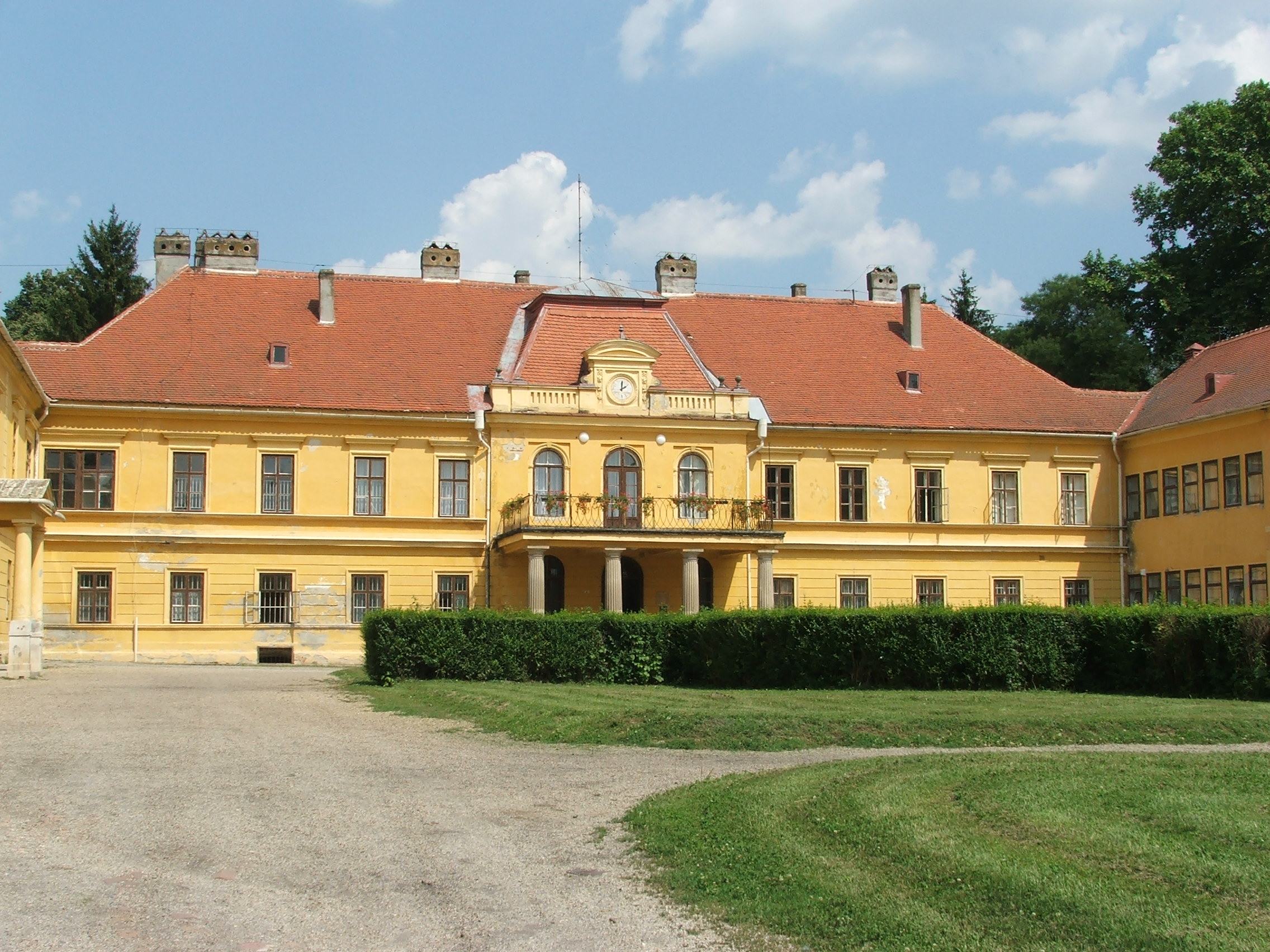
Main entrance of the Széchenyi Palace

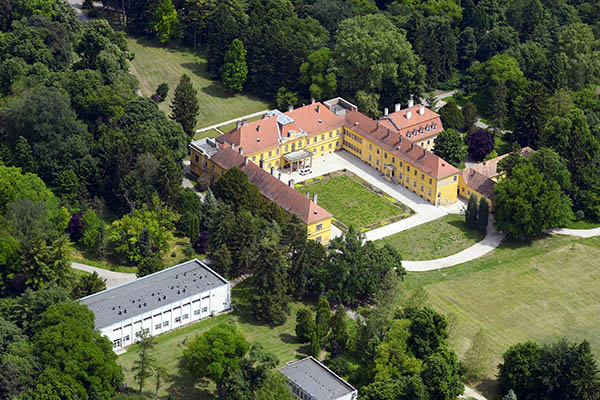
Aerial view of the Széchenyi Palace

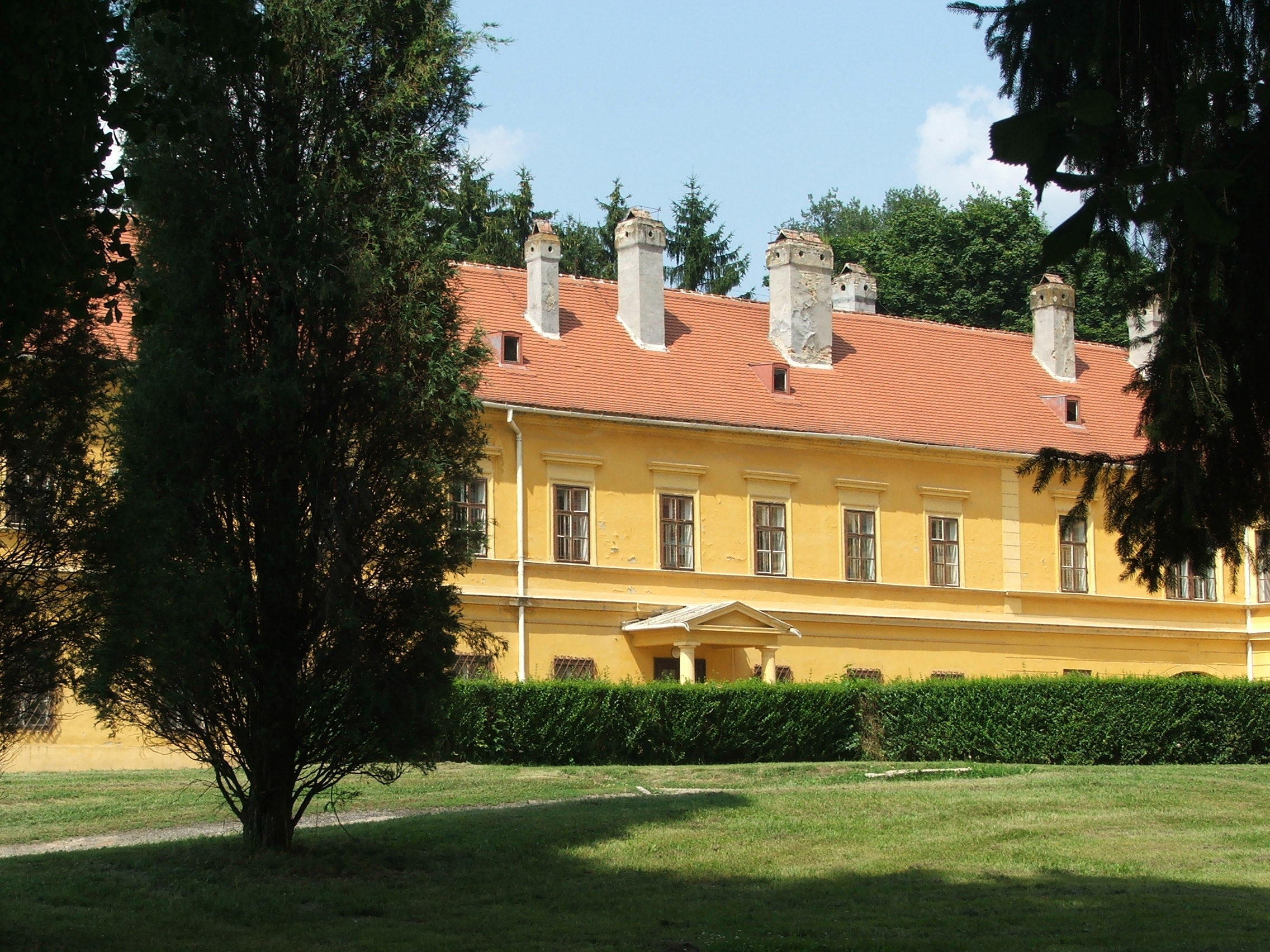
The park of the Széchenyi Palace

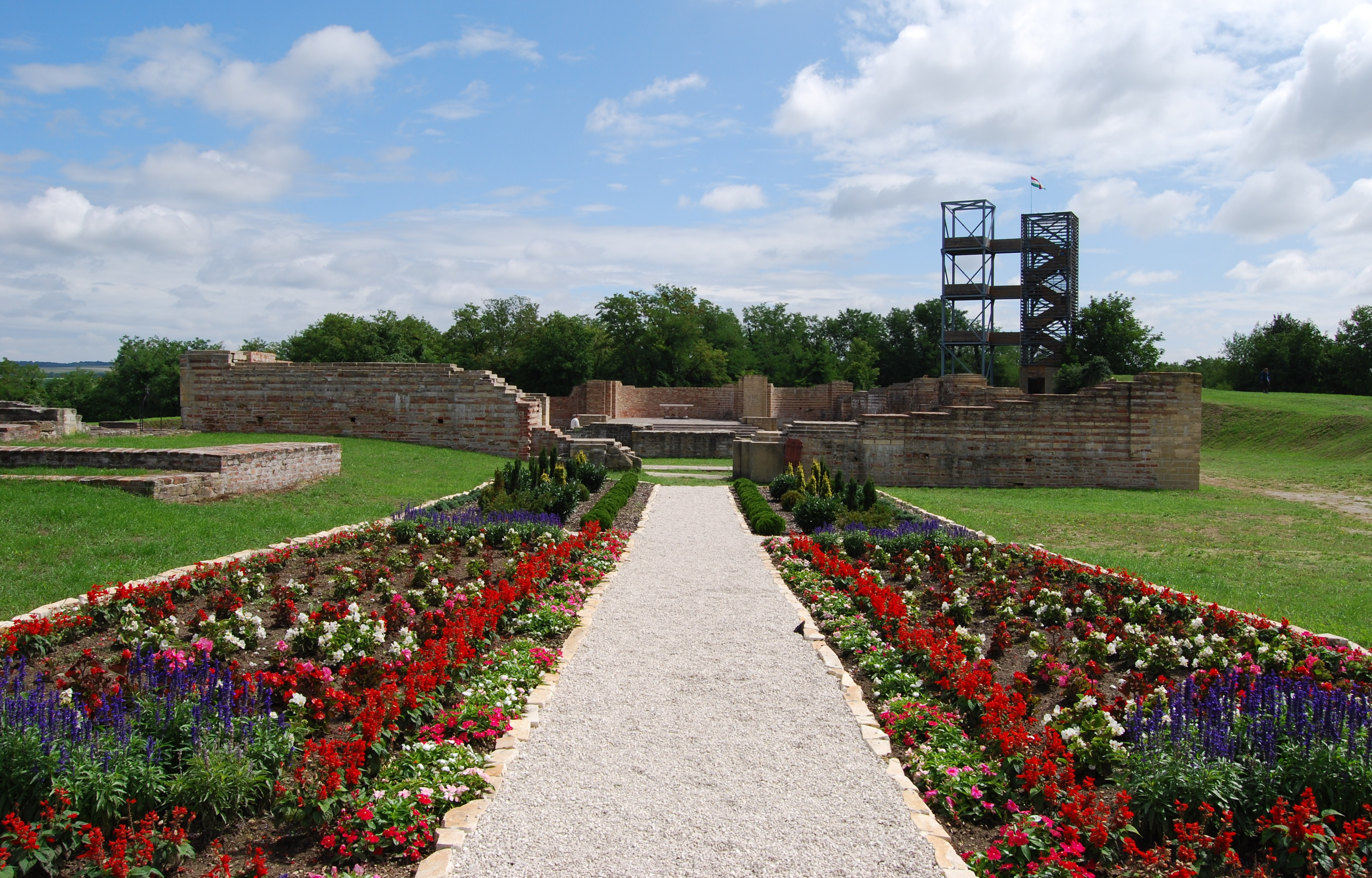
The ruins of Somogyvár Abbey

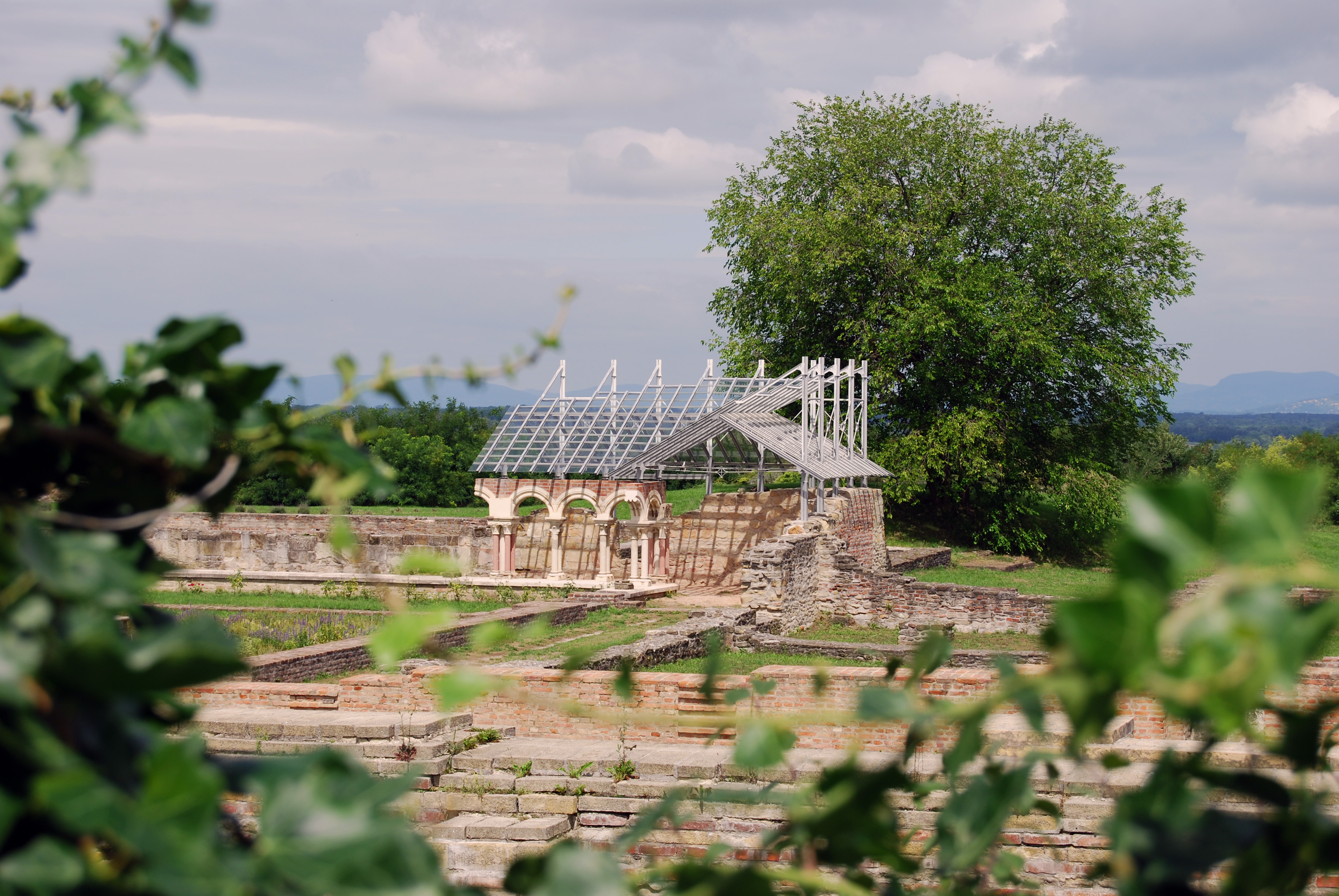
The ruins of Somogyvár Abbey

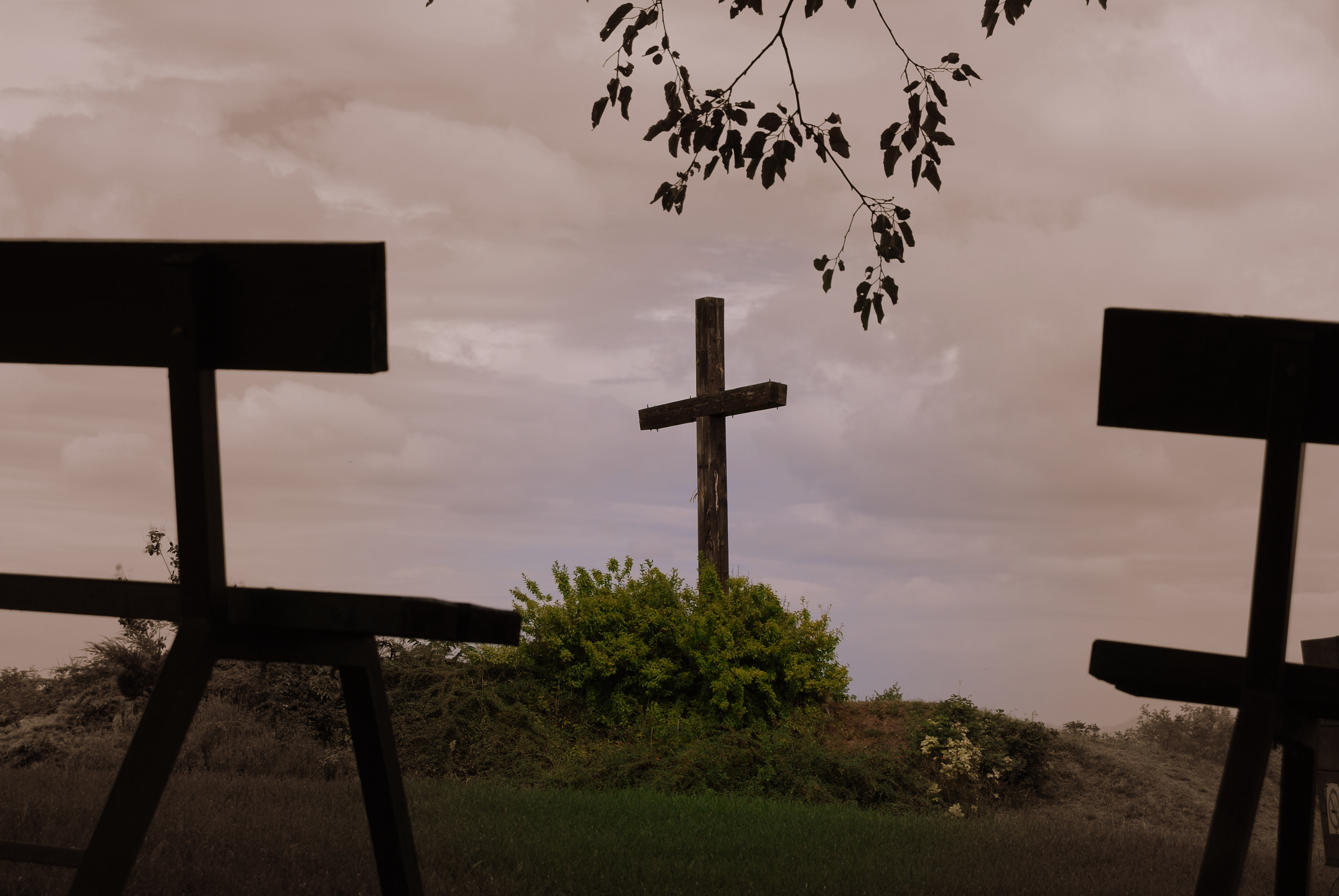
Cross in the park of Somogyvár Abbey

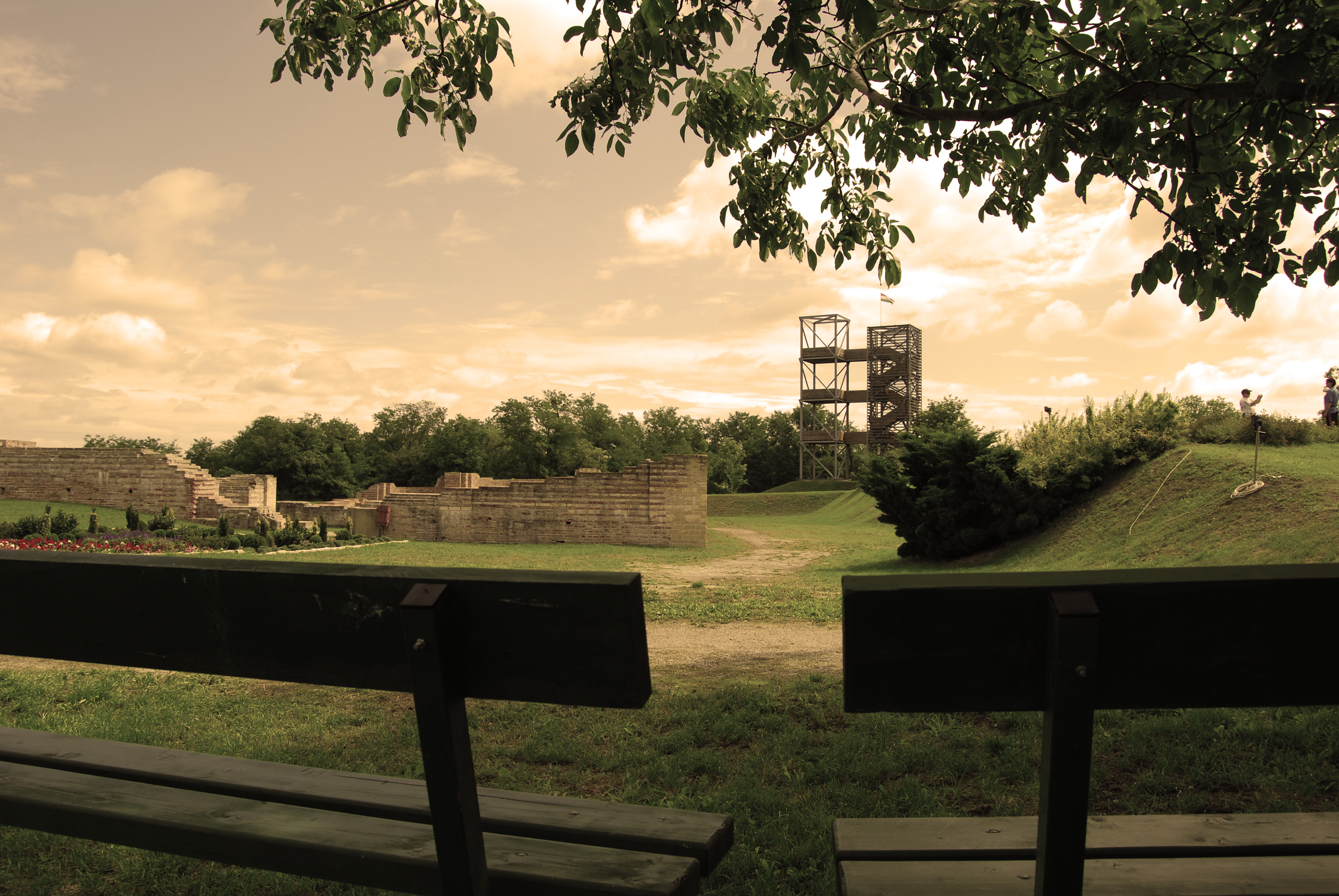
Belvedere of the Somogyvár Abbey

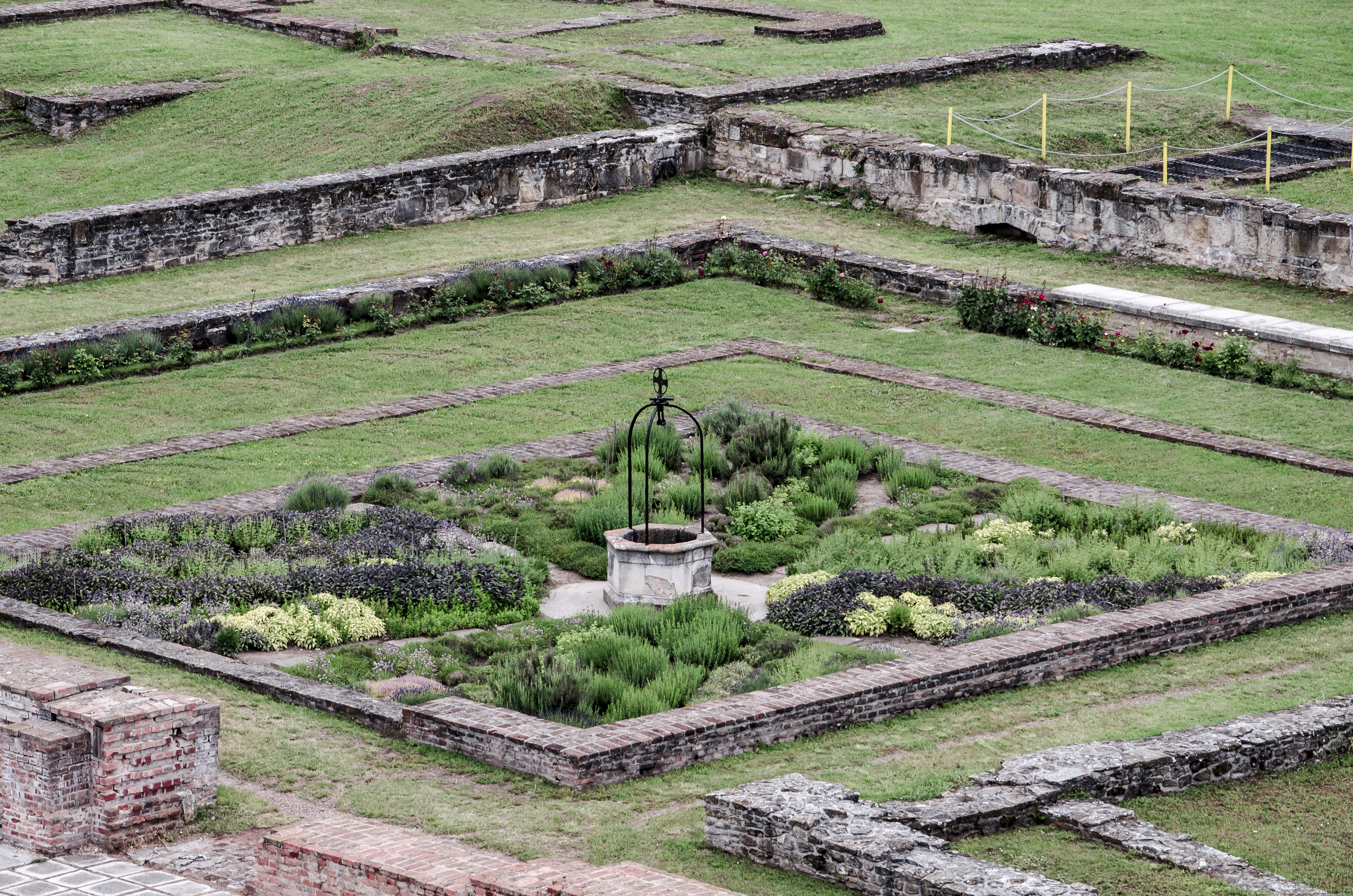
The well in the Somogyvár Abbey

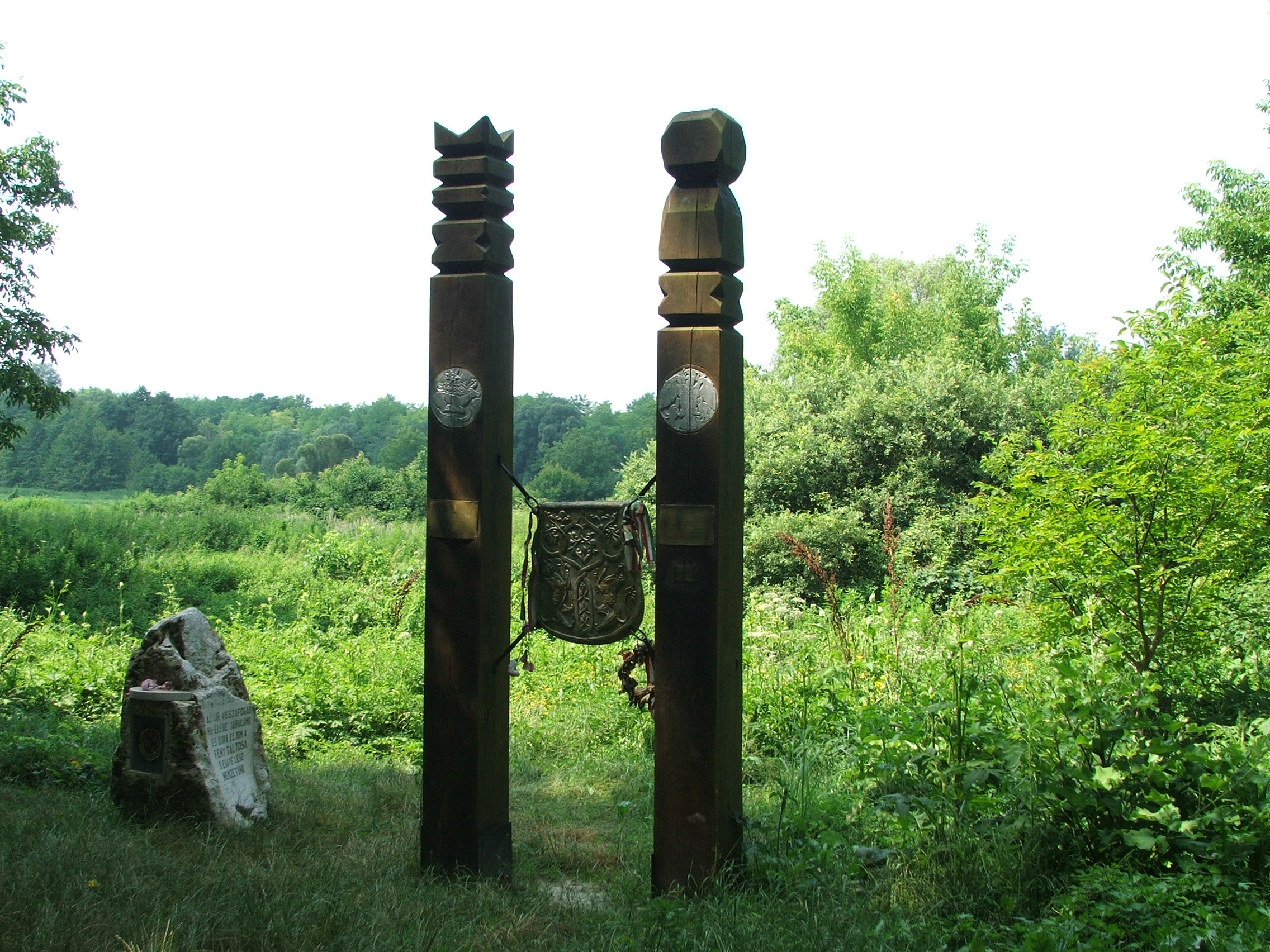
Szentesica founitain

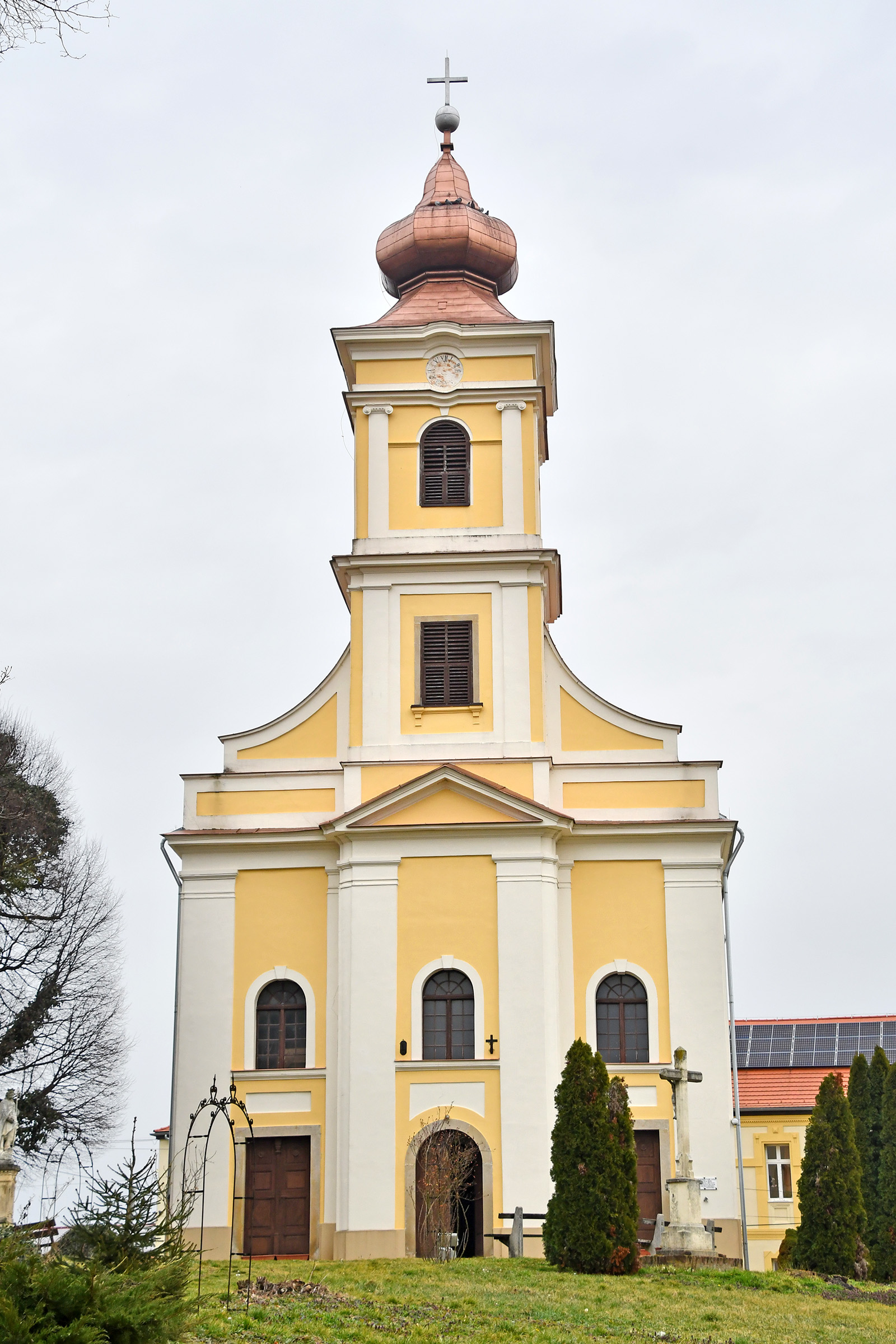
Roman Catholic church

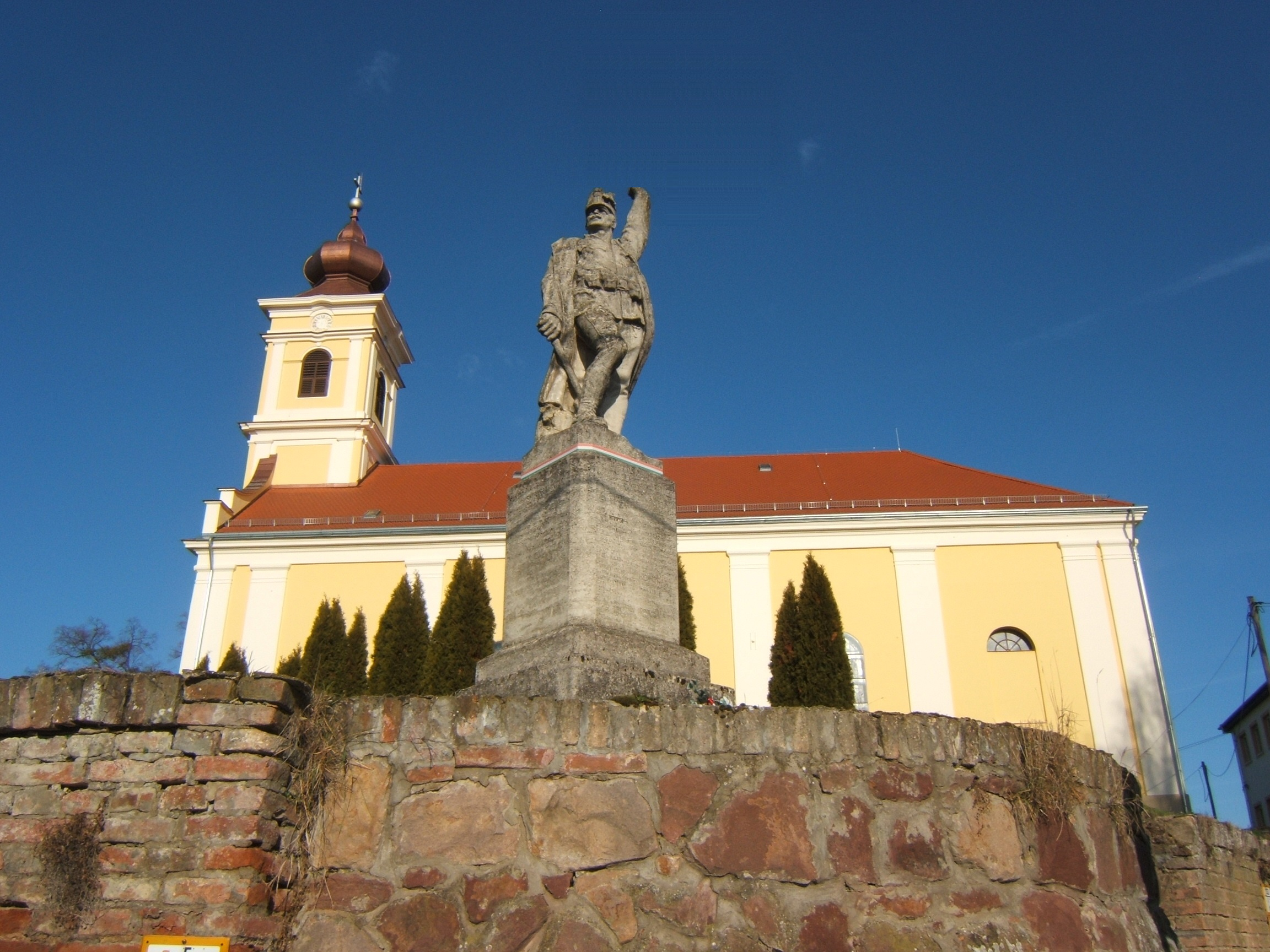
Roman Catholic church with the war memorial

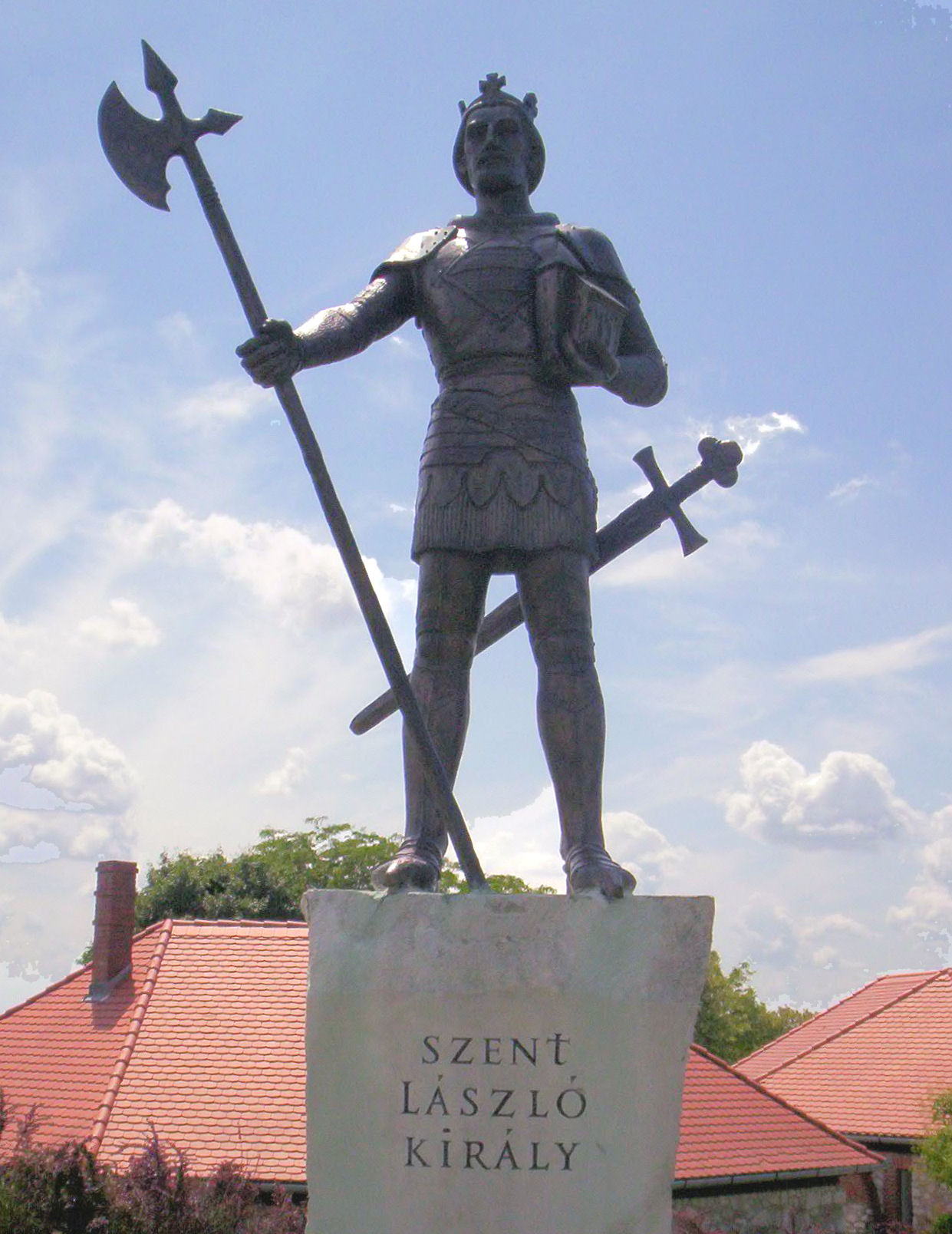
Statue of Saint Ladislaus
