= Bakich =

Bakich is a surname. Notable people with the surname include:

- Andrei Bakich (1878–1922), Russian army officer
- Erik Bakich (born 1977), American college baseball coach and player
- Huntley Bakich (born 1973), American football player

== See also ==
- 131245 Bakich, an asteroid
- Bakić (surname)
