= Fonyód District =

Fonyód District Fonyódi járás
- Districts of Hungary
- Coat of arms

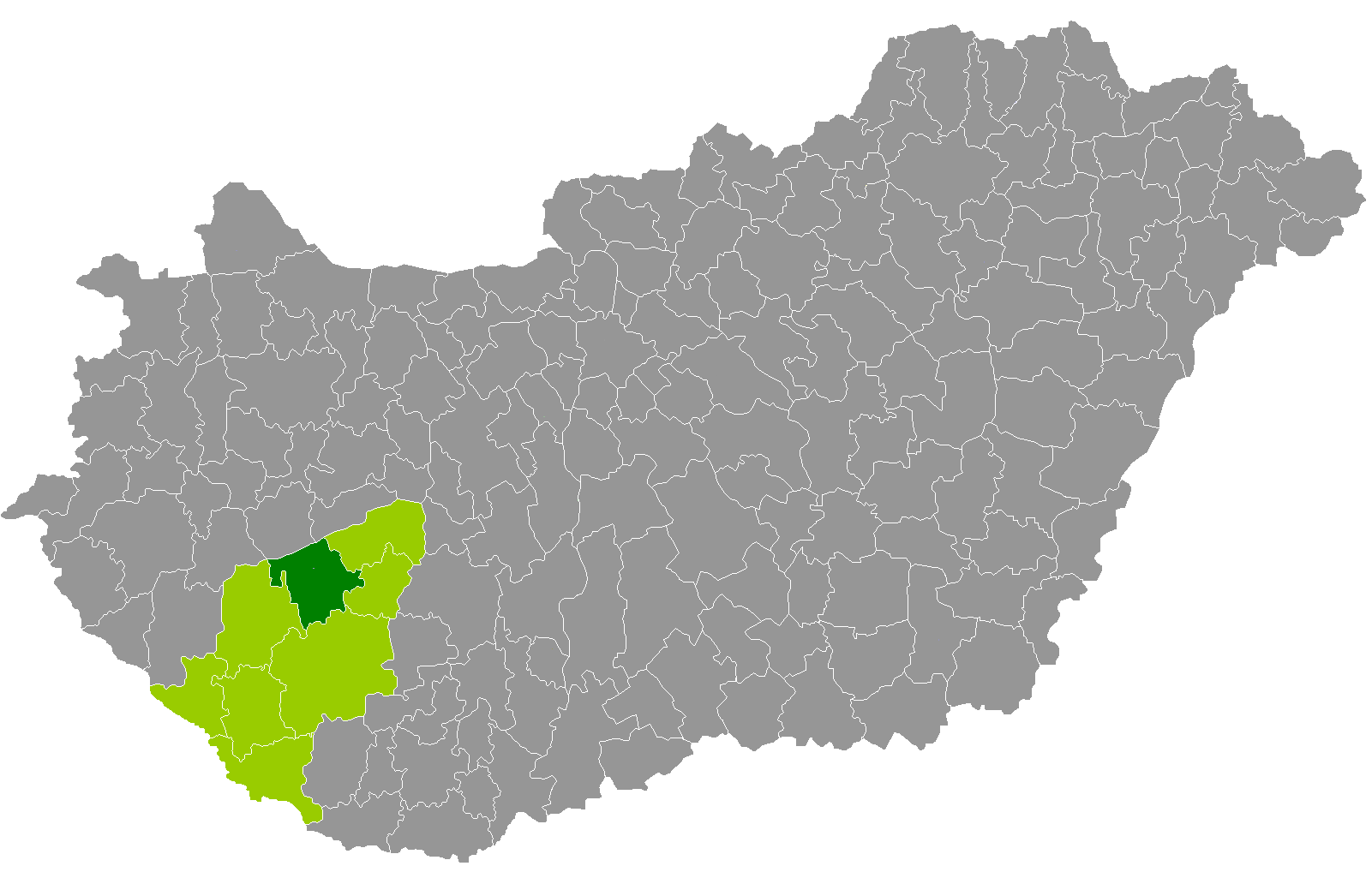
- Fonyód District within Hungary and Somogy County.
- Coordinates: 46.74°N 17.56°E
- Country: Hungary
- Region: Southern Transdanubia
- County: Somogy
- District seat: Fonyód

Area
  - Total: 645.44 km^{2} (249.21 sq mi)
  - Rank: 6th in Somogy

Population (2011 census)
  - Total: 33,785
  - Rank: 4th in Somogy
  - Density: 52/km^{2} (130/sq mi)

Fonyód (Hungarian: Fonyódi járás) is a district in northern part of Somogy County. Fonyód is also the name of the town where the district seat is located. The district is part of the Southern Transdanubia Statistical Region.

== Geography ==
Fonyód District borders with Tapolca District and Balatonfüred District (Veszprém County) to the north, Siófok District and Tab District to the east, Kaposvár District to the south, Marcali District to the west. The number of the inhabited places in Fonyód District is 21.

== Municipalities ==
The district has 4 towns and 17 villages. (ordered by population, as of 1 January 2013)

- **Balatonboglár** (5,901)
- Balatonfenyves (1,874)
- **Balatonlelle** (5,309)
- Buzsák (1,369)
- **Fonyód** (4,856) – district seat
- Gamás (794)
- Gyugy (288)
- Hács (398)
- Karád (1,584)
- Kisberény (183)
- Látrány (1,364)
- **Lengyeltóti** (3,123)
- Ordacsehi (794)
- Öreglak (1,572)
- Pamuk (245)
- Somogybabod (480)
- Somogytúr (447)
- Somogyvámos (774)
- Somogyvár (1,803)
- Szőlősgyörök (1,228)
- Visz (213)

The bolded municipalities are cities.

== See also ==
- List of cities and towns in Hungary
