= Somogytúr =

- Village
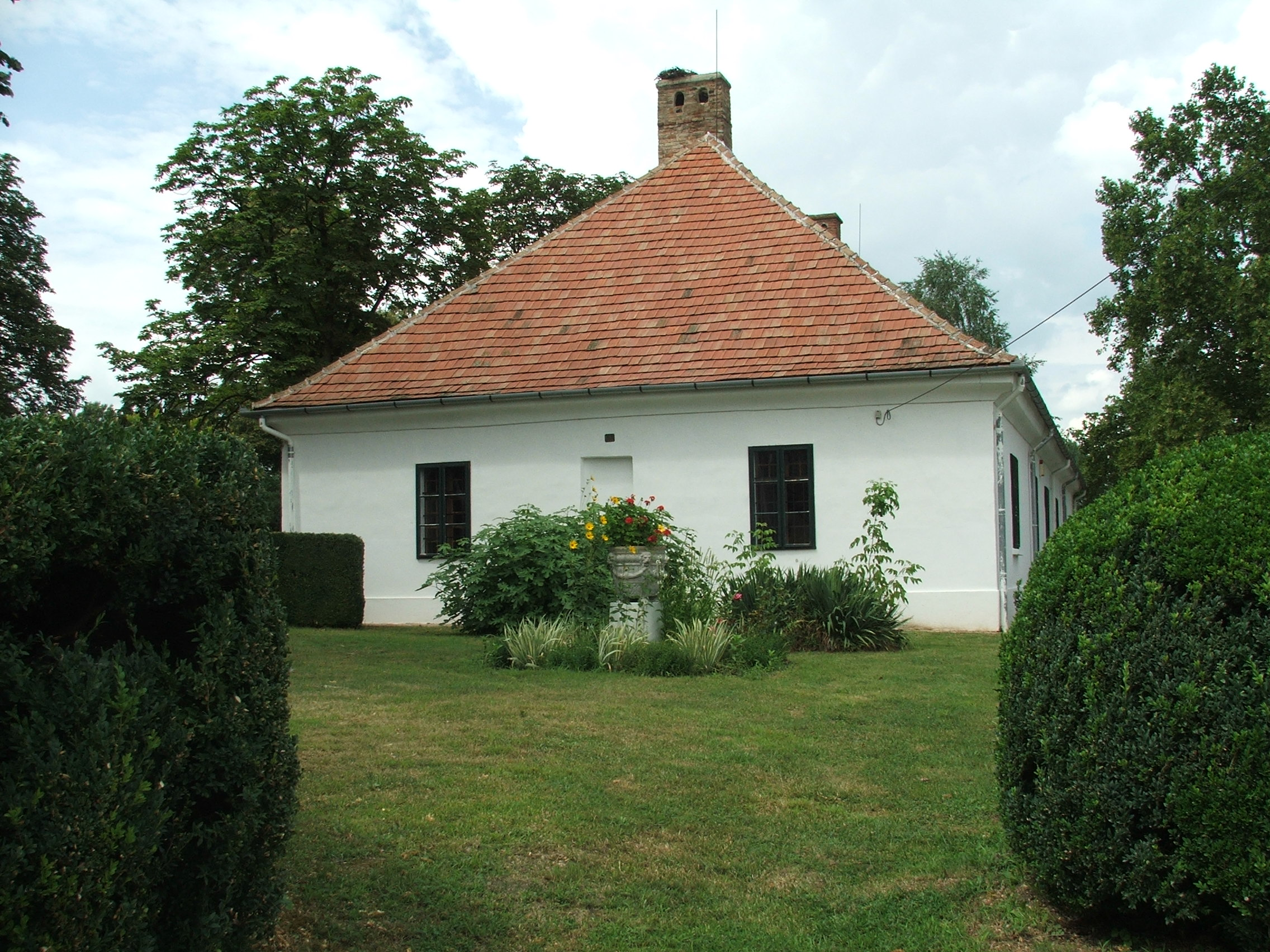
- Bosnyák Chateau in Somogytúr

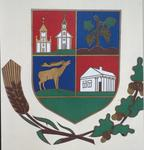
- Coat of arms

- Location of Somogy county in Hungary

- Location of Somogytúr
- Coordinates: 46.7089°N 17.76428°E
- Country: Hungary
- Region: Southern Transdanubia
- County: Somogy
- District: Fonyód
- RC Diocese: Kaposvár

Area
  - Total: 35.31 km^{2} (13.63 sq mi)

Population (2017)
  - Total: 437
  - Density: 11.97/km^{2} (31.0/sq mi)
- Demonym(s): túri, somogytúri
- Time zone: UTC+1 (CET)
  - Summer (DST): UTC+2 (CEST)
- Postal code: 8683
- Area code: (+36) 85
- Patron Saint: John the Baptist
- NUTS 3 code: HU232
- MP: József Attila Móring (KDNP)
- Website: Somogytúr Online

Somogytúr is a village in Somogy county, Hungary.

The settlement is part of the Balatonboglár wine region.
