= Gamás =

- Village
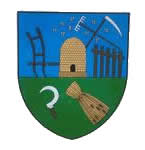
- Coat of arms

- Location of Somogy county in Hungary

- Location of Gamás
- Coordinates: 46.61974°N 17.76162°E
- Country: Hungary
- Region: Southern Transdanubia
- County: Somogy
- District: Fonyód
- RC Diocese: Kaposvár

Area
  - Total: 42.92 km^{2} (16.57 sq mi)

Population (2017)
  - Total: 742
  - Density: 17.3/km^{2} (44.8/sq mi)
- Demonym: gamási
- Time zone: UTC+1 (CET)
  - Summer (DST): UTC+2 (CEST)
- Postal code: 8685
- Area code: (+36) 85
- NUTS 3 code: HU232
- MP: József Attila Móring (KDNP)
- Website: Gamás Online

Gamás is a village in Somogy county, Hungary.

== History ==
According to László Szita the settlement was completely Hungarian in the 18th century.
