= Fonyód–Alsóbélatelep =

Coordinates: 46.729723°N 17.533855°E

Somogy
- Interactive map of Somogy
- Country: Hungary
- Time zone: UTC+1 (CET)
  - Summer (DST): UTC+2 (CEST)

Fonyód–Alsóbélatelep is a resort near to Fonyód, in Somogy county, Hungary. The settlement is located on the southern side of Lake Balaton, opposite to the Hill of Badacsony.
