= Somogyvár Abbey =

Benedictine monastery in Somogyvár, Hungary

Coordinates: 46.5947°N 17.6379°E

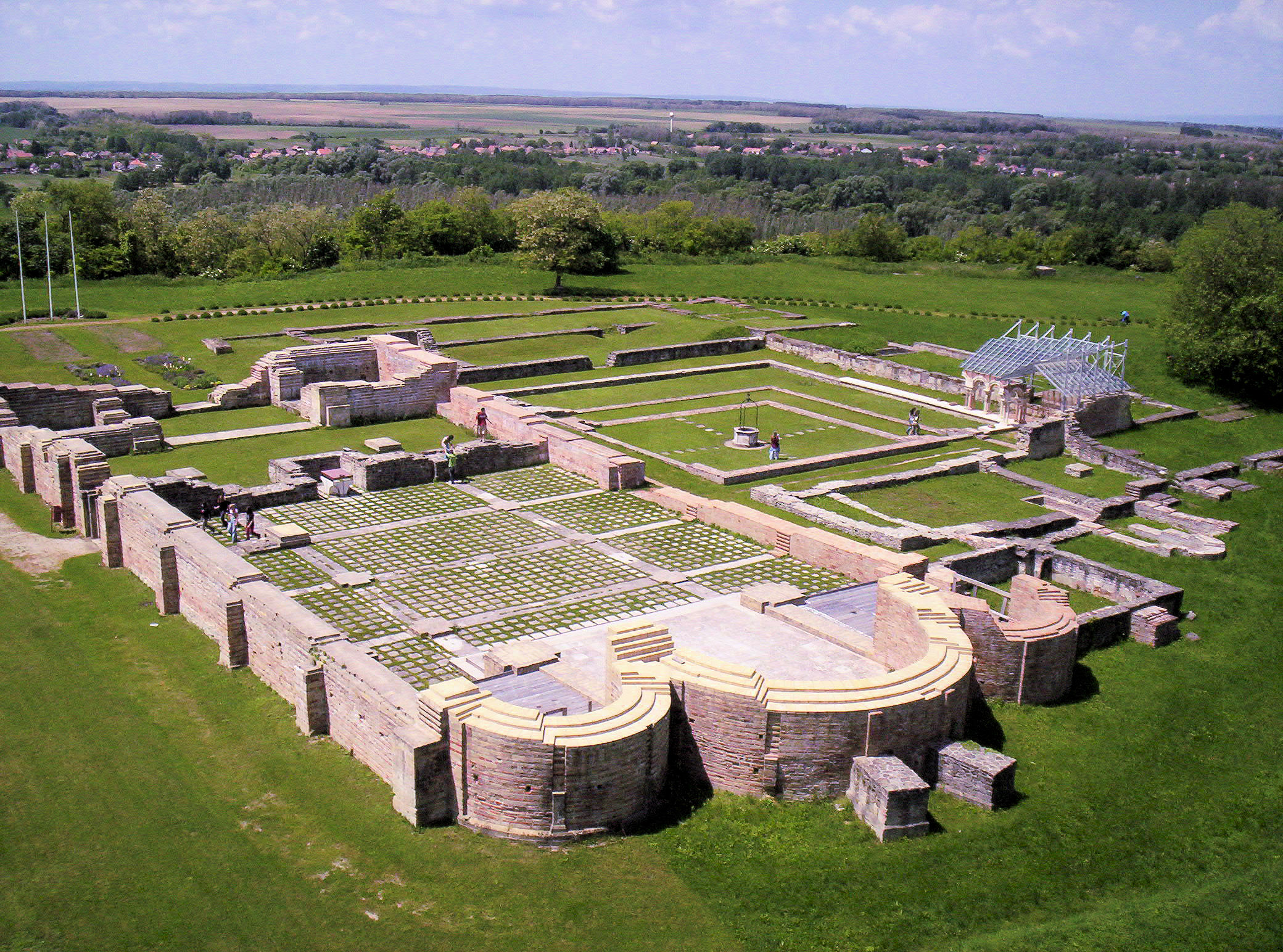
Remains of the Somogyvár Abbey

The Somogyvár Abbey (Szent Egyed Abbey) was a Benedictine monastery established at Somogyvár in the Kingdom of Hungary in 1091. It was dedicated to Saint Giles.

A legal formulary book was compiled there in the second half of the 15th century.

== Sources ==
- Berend, Nora; Laszlovszky, József; Szakács, Béla Zsolt (2007). "The kingdom of Hungary". In Berend, Nora (ed.). Christianization and the Rise of Christian Monarchy: Scandinavia, Central Europe and Rus', c.900-1200. Cambridge University Press. pp. 319–368. ISBN 978-0-521-87616-2.
- Koszta, László; Marosi, Ernő (1994). "Somogyvár". In Kristó, Gyula; Engel, Pál; Makk, Ferenc (eds.). Korai magyar történeti lexikon (9-14. század) [=Encyclopedia of the Early Hungarian History (9th-14th centuries)] (in Hungarian). Akadémiai Kiadó. pp. 605–606. ISBN 963-05-6722-9.
