= Lengyeltóti =

- Town
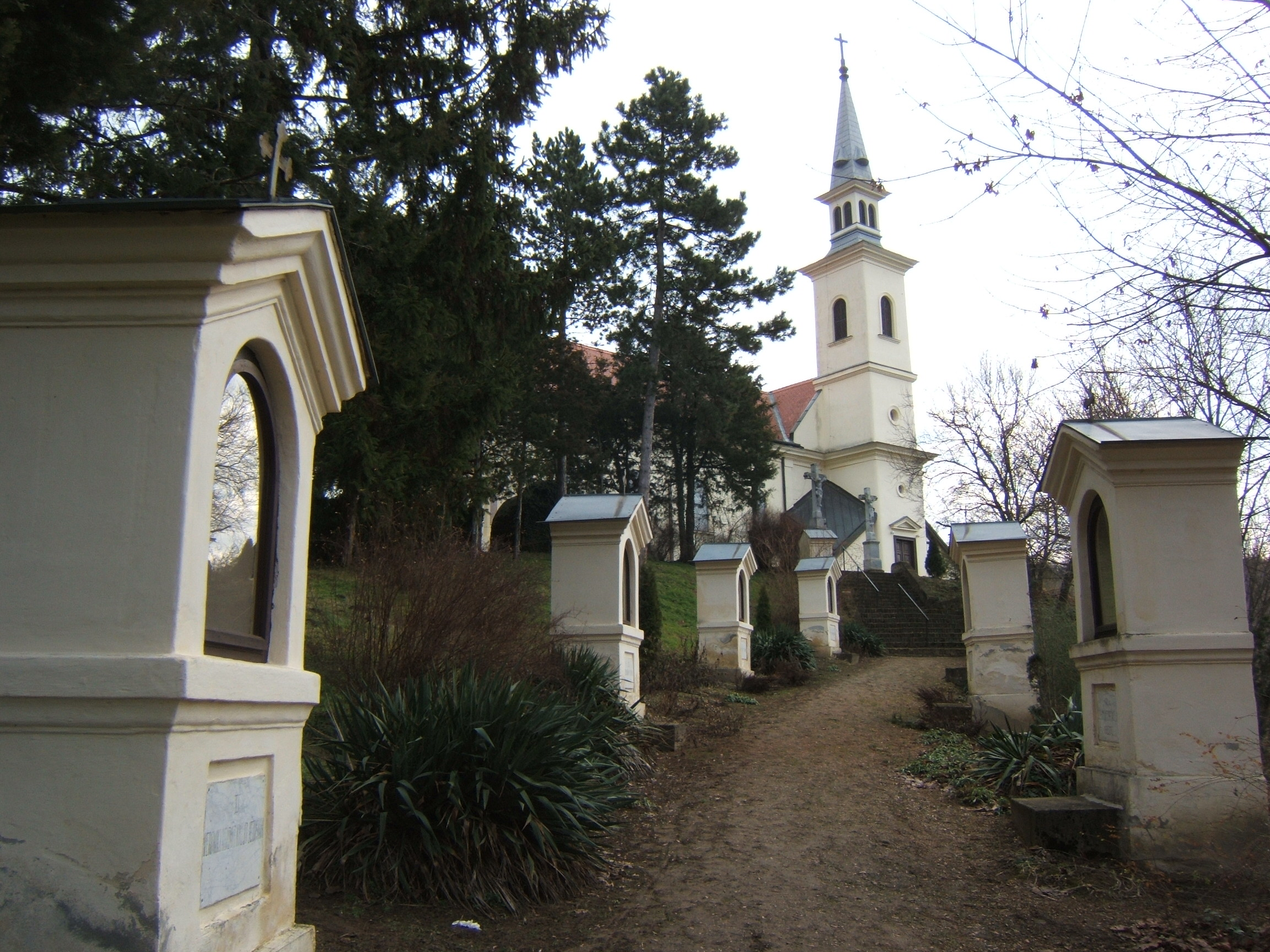
- Calvary of Lengyeltóti

- Flag Coat of arms

- Location of Somogy county in Hungary

- Location of Lengyeltóti
- Coordinates: 46.66829°N 17.63606°E
- Country: Hungary
- Region: Southern Transdanubia
- County: Somogy
- District: Fonyód
- RC Diocese: Kaposvár

Area
  - Total: 39.57 km^{2} (15.28 sq mi)

Population (2017)
  - Total: 2,920
  - Density: 73.8/km^{2} (191/sq mi)
- Demonym: lengyeltóti
- Time zone: UTC+1 (CET)
  - Summer (DST): UTC+2 (CEST)
- Postal code: 8693
- Area code: (+36) 85
- Patron Saint: James, son of Zebedee
- NUTS 3 code: HU232
- MP: József Attila Móring (KDNP)
- Website: Lengyeltóti Online

Lengyeltóti is a town in Somogy county, Hungary.

The settlement is part of the Balatonboglár wine region.

== Settings ==
The town can be found south from Fonyód, along the highway to Somogyvár, the old seat of the county. The highway went from the Lake Balaton to the southern part of the country. The town sits on the top of a hill. Its name: Tóti meant Slavonic people in Hungarian, so probably the old village was populated partly by Slavonic people. First charters mention the village in 1116.

== Historical sights ==
The Lengyeltóti Roman Catholic Church is an extraordinary heritage. In the 90s it was known only as a modern times church in eclectic style. During the renovation in 1989 it turned out that walls of an Árpád age church can be found in the southern part of the eclectic new church.

The archeological restoration revealed the 12th-century church with pair of western towers and three apses in the east side of the east–west nave. The architectural markers date the church back to the 1100 years. The village name had not been mentioned in the list of 1333 Roman Pope episcopal church tax collection, so it is probable that some of the orders at that time in Hungary owned the monastery church.

== Twin towns – sister cities ==
Lengyeltóti is twinned with:

- Lupeni, Romania
- Dielheim, Germany
- Węgierska Górka, Poland
- Lechnica, Slovakia
- Đurđevac, Croatia
