= Visz =

- Village
- Coat of arms

- Location of Somogy county in Hungary

- Location of Visz
- Coordinates: 46.72819°N 17.78394°E
- Country: Hungary
- Region: Southern Transdanubia
- County: Somogy
- District: Fonyód
- RC Diocese: Kaposvár

Area
  - Total: 6.02 km^{2} (2.32 sq mi)

Population (2017)
  - Total: 207
  - Density: 34.4/km^{2} (89.1/sq mi)
- Demonym: viszi
- Time zone: UTC+1 (CET)
  - Summer (DST): UTC+2 (CEST)
- Postal code: 8681
- Area code: (+36) 85
- NUTS 3 code: HU232
- MP: Mihály Witzmann (Fidesz)
- Website: Visz Online

Visz is a village in Somogy county, Hungary.

The settlement is part of the Balatonboglár wine region.
