= Somogybabod =

- Village
- Coat of arms

- Location of Somogy county in Hungary

- Location of Somogybabod
- Coordinates: 46.67012°N 17.77926°E
- Country: Hungary
- Region: Southern Transdanubia
- County: Somogy
- District: Fonyód
- RC Diocese: Kaposvár

Area
  - Total: 10.59 km^{2} (4.09 sq mi)

Population (2017)
  - Total: 446
  - Density: 42.1/km^{2} (109/sq mi)
- Demonym(s): babodi, somogybabodi
- Time zone: UTC+1 (CET)
  - Summer (DST): UTC+2 (CEST)
- Postal code: 8684
- Area code: (+36) 85
- Patron Saint: Saint Elizabeth
- NUTS 3 code: HU232
- MP: Mihály Witzmann (Fidesz)
- Website: Somogybabod Online

Somogybabod is a village in Somogy county, Hungary.
