= Huntley Bakich =

American football player (born 1973)

Huntley Warga Bakich
Profile
- Position: Linebacker

Personal information
- Born: January 2, 1973 (age 53); Palm Beach, Florida
- Listed height: 6 ft 3 in (1.91 m)
- Listed weight: 210 lb (95 kg)

Career information
- High school: Dallas (TX) White
- College: Notre Dame
- NFL draft: 1995: undrafted

Huntley Bakich (born 1973) is an American former football linebacker. He played at W.T. White High School in Dallas, Texas.

During his Senior year he was recognized by Parade Magazine All-American team, 1991 USA Today High School All-American team, USA Today Texas Player of the year, Touchdown Club of Columbus Player of the Year Runner Up with Former All-American linebacker Derek Brooks, Dallas All Sports Association (DASA) Male Athlete of the Year and among others, the Texas FAB 55 list of top players in the State along with future Notre Dame teammate Mike Miller, also a FAB 55 selection in 1991.

A lifelong resident of Dallas, Texas, Bakich played college football at the University of Notre Dame under Coach Lou Holtz. Bakich was the recipient of a nationally televised removal from a game by his facemask, and an ensuing sideline tongue-lashing by Coach Holtz for his participation a fight against Michigan State.

He suffered an Achilles' tendon injury and back injuries, and following doctors' advice gave up playing football after his junior season.

Bakich has spent his post-graduate career as a company founder and executive consultant in the telecommunications industry.

As of 2012, Bakich resided in Dallas, Texas, with his wife Margaret and their five children.
