= Tanja Bakić =

Montenegrin poet

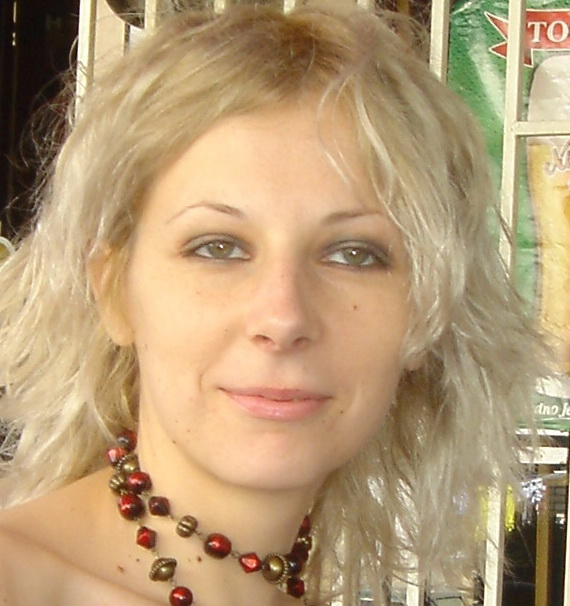
Tanja Bakić

Tanja Bakić (born 14 September 1981) is a prominent Montenegrin poet, literary scholar, music writer and translator. She resides in Podgorica, where she has worked variously as an educator, editor, PR officer, interpreter and curator of literary-themed soirées and events. Her poems received numerous critical accolades and were frequently anthologized even in serious collections such as Ban’ya Natsuishiʼs 2016 “World Haiku” (Tokyo: World Haiku Association). She was a speaker at William Blake colloquium at Tate Britain in London. As a literary theorist, she contributes to Bloomsbury Publishing. She is the winner of Central European Initiative Fellowship for Writers Award 2016 bestowed upon her at Vilenica International Literary Festival in Slovenia. Chosen by the Australian poet Les Wicks among only sixteen writers across the globe who ‘bring something unique to the world poetry movement’ (Rochford Street Review).

She was the first student in the history of University of Montenegro ever to graduate with a degree thesis connected with rock and roll music. Earning a Doctor of Philosophy degree in English literature, her major scholarly interests have revolved around studies of William Blake and Music of the United Kingdom (1960s). She has been featured in the line-ups at various festivals across Europe; the winner of several fellowships for writers; twice selected by an international jury of art critics as the Montenegrin representative at the art biennial of Europe and the Mediterranean – in Ancona in 2013 and in Milan in 2015. She has contributed an aural component to a plant installation by Australian eco-designer, Tanja Beer, presented by Arts House in Melbourne in partnership with Cambridge Junction, United Kingdom. She is responsible for the Montenegrin component of the world poetry festival ‘Palabra en el Mundo’, during which she edited a poetry-themed radio show streamed to 154 countries worldwide. Her poetry volumes garnered much public attention and were highly acclaimed. Her poetical voice was described as “possessing a high quality… and capable of producing pictures and images reminiscent of ones found in the ancient Chinese divination text, I Ching” (David Albahari). She was dubbed a poet whose lyrics are “potent and musical” (JL Williams, Scottish Poetry Library), “faithful to Zen Buddhism” (Nicola Frangione) and “in line with contemporary world poetry” (Slave Gjorgjo Dimoski, Struga Poetry Evenings). Her best-selling music-related non-fiction work, “Voodoo Child: A Story About Jimi Hendrix” (“Voodoo Child: Priča o Jimiju Hendrixu”, 2013), revealing her collaboration with Jimi Hendrix's former London-based girlfriend Kathy Etchingham and his sound engineer Roger Mayer (engineer) was deemed a huge success in Montenegro. She is also the author of the provocative Brian Jones and his Band (2019), dedicated to the 50th anniversary of Brian Jones’ death, in which she interviewed Michael Lindsay-Hogg, who directed promotional videos for the Beatles and The Rolling Stones, and who was rumoured to be a son of Orson Welles. The cover of her latest poetry volume Intertext (2022) is inspired by Performance (film), starring Mick Jagger and Anita Pallenberg.

== Selected works ==
=== Books ===
- A Winkle (Treptaj, 1996), poetry
- Madonna - the Slave or the Queen (Madonna robinja ili kraljica, 2008), musical non-fiction
- The Sick Rose (Bolesna ruža, 2009), poetry
- Grass, eBook (Trava, 2009), poetry
- Silken Shoes (Svilene cipelice, 2011), poetry
- Lover-crossed Star: Selected Poems (2012), poetry published in English
- The Seed and Other Poems (Sjeme i druge pjesme, 2013), poetry published bilingually in English and in Montenegrin
- Voodoo Child: A Story About Jimi Hendrix (Voodoo Child: Priča o Džimiju Hendriksu, 2013), music-related non-fiction work
- Brian Jones and His Band (Brian Jones i njegov bend, 2019), music-related non-fiction work
- Intertext (Intertext, 2022), poetry

=== Translations ===
- The Hungry Stones (Gladno kamenje) by Rabindranath Tagore (2008), tale
- The War of the Worlds (Rat svjetova) by H. G. Wells (2009), novel
- Jonathan Livingston Seagull (Galeb Džonatan Livingston) by Richard Bach (2009), novel
- Animal Farm (Životinjska farma) by George Orwell (2011), novel
- The Arc of Finitude (Putanja konačnosti) by Mladen Lompar, co-translated into English with Stephen J. Mangan (2013), poetry collection
- The Hungry Stones and Other Stories (Gladno kamenje i druge priče) by Rabindranath Tagore (2014), collection of short stories
- Landing Light (Lako prizemljenje) by Don Paterson (2018), poetry volume

=== Editorship ===
- Good manners: How to Behave in the Contemporary World (2009)
- If Thou Knowest What Love Be, an anthology of World love poetry (2009)
- Eight, Selected Poems of Ibrahim Spahić (2011)
- Catalogue of Ratković Poetry Evenings (ed. and trans. into English, 2012)
- Almanac of Ratković Poetry Evenings (ed. and trans. into English, 2018)
