= Bakić noble family =

Serbian noble family

Bakić Бакић Bakics
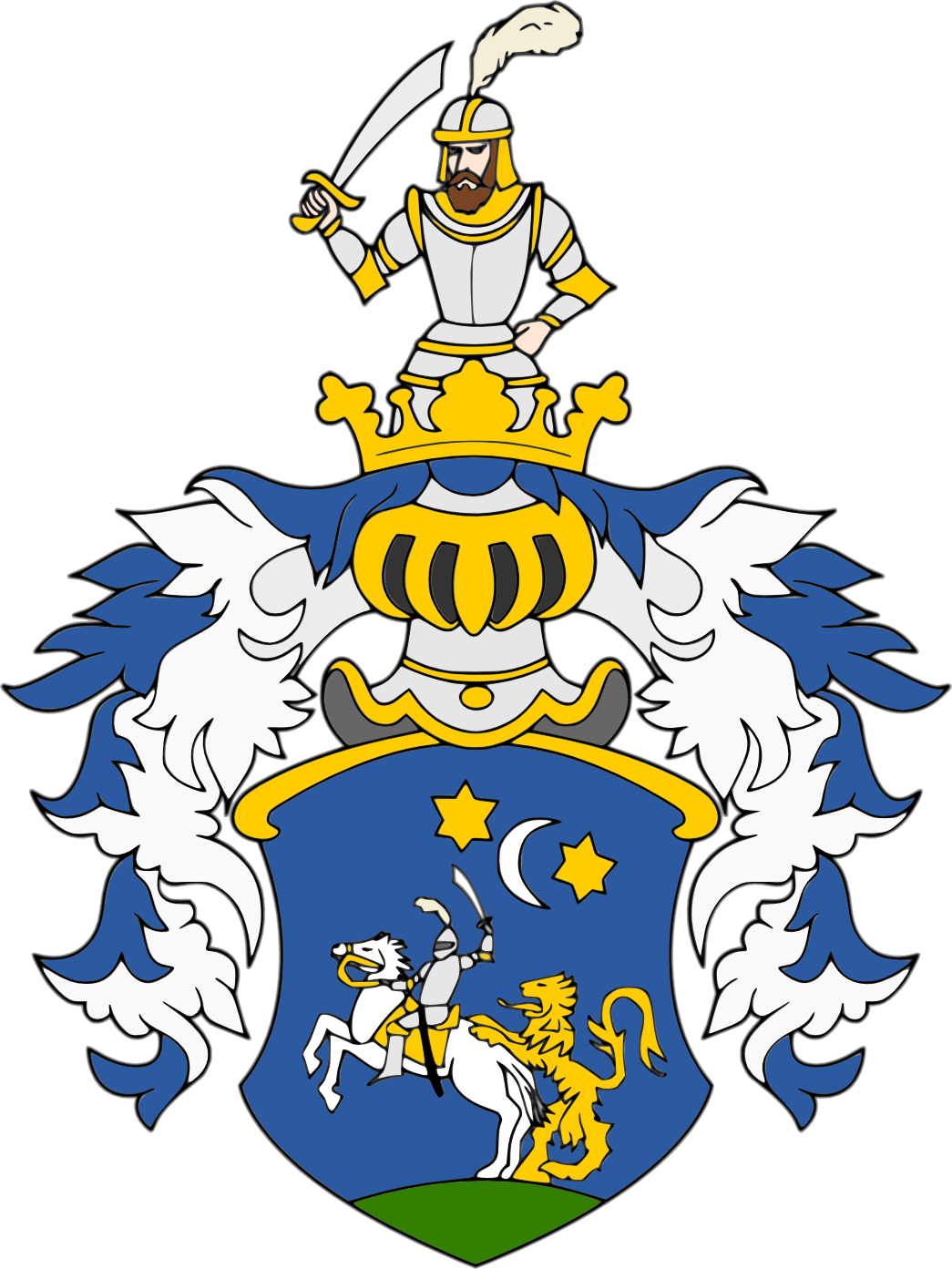
- Country: Serbian Despotate; Kingdom of Hungary
- Founded: before 1525
- Titles: gospodar despot
- Estates: "Bakić's land", estates around Venčac in Šumadija (until 1525); Lak, Győr, Szombathely, Hédervár and all estates that are part of these towns (1534)
- Dissolution: after 1727

The Bakić family (Serbian Cyrillic: Бакић, pl. Бакићи / Bakići; Hungarian: Bakics család) was a Serbian noble family that initially held estates in Šumadija (south of the Danube) under Ottoman occupation, then crossed the river and gave its service to the Kingdom of Hungary, becoming one of the leading Serbian noble family in the country, fighting the Ottoman Empire.

== History ==
Pavle Bakić had a timar, as did his father, and held great estates around Venčac in Šumadija called "Bakić's land". He was highly viewed of by the Ottoman Empire, and had the rights to collect taxes (harač) from his people. In talks with Pál Tomori and Louis II of Hungary, he left his land with his family, five brothers (including Petar Bakić), and a great number of Serbs, into Hungary, and in return he received the town of Lak among other estates. With his forces he participated in the Battle of Mohács in 1526. When the succession war between Ferdinand I and John Zápolya started, he took the side of Zápolya. After the defeat of Zápolya in the Battle of Tokaj in 1527, he sided with Ferdinand and would stay faithful to him for the rest of his life. In 1528, Ferdinand confirmed Bakić and his brothers' holdings and appointed him the captain of the Serbian infantry, cavalry and river forces. In the defence of Vienna in 1529, Bakić was an important aspect with his cavalry. In charters of 1534, Ferdinand again confirmed Bakić and his brothers' holdings (Lak, Győr, Szombathely, Hédervár and all estates that were part of these towns). The fortress of Győr was administered by his Hungarian ally Count György Cseszneky. A charter dated September 20, 1537, titles him as Despot and called all Serbs to join Bakić as the Serbian Despot. Attempts made by King Ferdinand to push the Ottomans out of Slavonia, with the use of Pavle, were not successful. Bakić did not manage to liberate Osijek from the Ottomans, he then retreated to Đakovo, where he died in 1537 at the battle of Gorjani, against the Ottomans. Mehmed Pasha sent his son with the head of Bakić to Istanbul.

== Members ==
- Pavle Bakić (Pál, fl. 1526-1537)
  - Margit, married Menyhért Balassa)
  - Angelika, married Imre Révay, later Imre Czobor.
- Petar Bakić (Péter, fl. 1542-1552)
- (Kelemen, fl.)
- (Manó, fl.)
- (Demeter, fl.)
- (Mihály, fl.)
  - (Bakics Mátyás, fl. 1565)
  - (Bakics Péter, fl. 1715-1723)
  - (Bakics Antal, fl. 1727)

== Sources ==
- Bataković, Dušan T., ed. (2005). Histoire du peuple serbe [History of the Serbian People] (in French). Lausanne: L’Age d’Homme. ISBN 9782825119587.
- Ćirković, Sima (2004). The Serbs. Malden: Blackwell Publishing. ISBN 9781405142915.
- Gavrilović, Slavko (1993). "Serbs in Hungary, Slavonia and Croatia in struggles against the Turks (15th-18th centuries)". Serbs in European Civilization. Belgrade: Nova, Serbian Academy of Sciences and Arts, Institute for Balkan Studies. pp. 41–54. ISBN 9788675830153.
- Isailović, Neven; Krstić, Aleksandar (2015). "Serbian Language and Cyrillic Script as a Means of Diplomatic Literacy in South Eastern Europe in 15th and 16th Centuries". Literacy Experiences concerning Medieval and Early Modern Transylvania. Cluj-Napoca: George Bariţiu Institute of History. pp. 185–195.
- Jireček, Constantin (1918). Geschichte der Serben. Vol. 2. Gotha: Perthes.
- Krstić, Aleksandar (2017). "Which Realm will You Opt for? – The Serbian Nobility Between the Ottomans and the Hungarians in the 15th Century". State and Society in the Balkans Before and After Establishment of Ottoman Rule. Belgrade: Institute of History, Yunus Emre Enstitüsü Turkish Cultural Centre. pp. 129–163. ISBN 9788677431259.
- Krstić, Aleksandar; Magina, Adrian (2021). "The Belmužević Family: The Fate of a Noble Family in South-East Europe During the Turbulent Period of the Ottoman Conquest (the 15th and First Half of the 16th Centuries)". Revue des études sud-est européennes. 59: 105–123.
- Lemajić, Nenad (2020). "The Bakićes as an example of the social rise of vlach families in the early Ottoman period". Istraživanja. 31. Filozofski fakultet u Novom Sadu: 93–111.
- Živanović, Đorđe (1959), "Живот Константина Михаиловића", Константин Михаиловић из Островице, Projekat Rastko – Poljska
