= Somogyvámos =

- Village
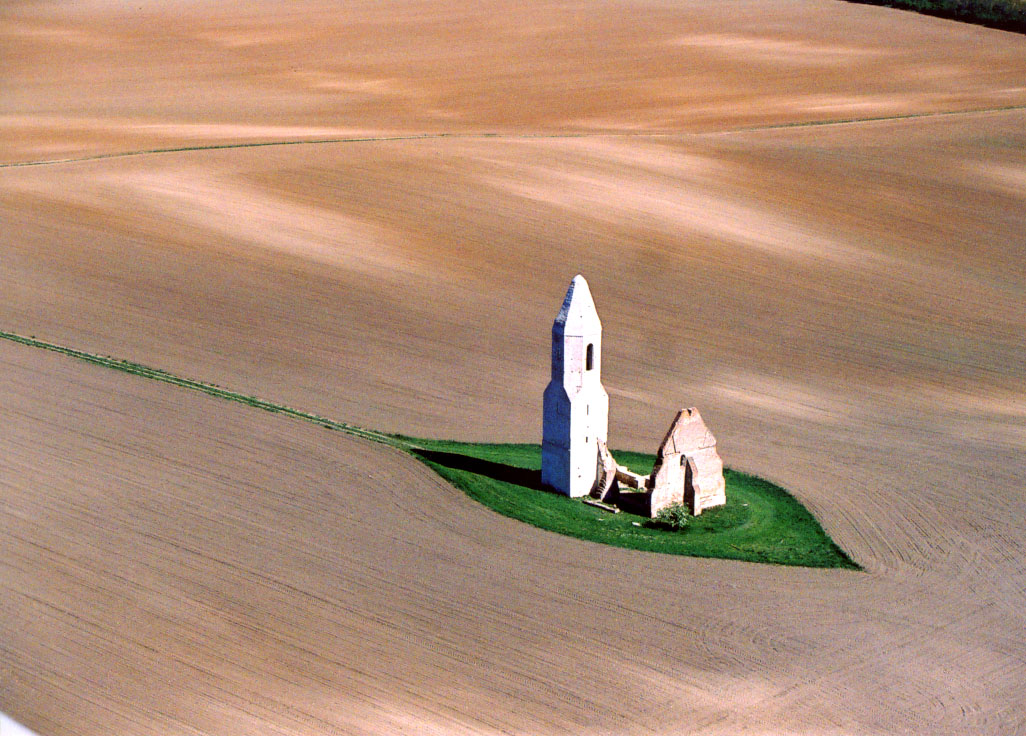
- The Pusztatemplom

- Coat of arms

- Location of Somogy county in Hungary

- Location of Somogyvámos
- Coordinates: 46.57040°N 17.68041°E
- Country: Hungary
- Region: Southern Transdanubia
- County: Somogy
- District: Fonyód
- RC Diocese: Kaposvár

Area
  - Total: 25.02 km^{2} (9.66 sq mi)

Population (2017)
  - Total: 744
  - Density: 29.7/km^{2} (77.0/sq mi)
- Demonym(s): vámosi, somogyvámosi
- Time zone: UTC+1 (CET)
  - Summer (DST): UTC+2 (CEST)
- Postal code: 8699
- Area code: (+36) 85
- Patron Saint: Prince Emeric
- NUTS 3 code: HU232
- MP: József Attila Móring (KDNP)
- Website: Somogyvámos Online

Somogyvámos is a village in Somogy county, Hungary. It is about 25 km north of Kaposvár, and about 25 km south of Fonyód.

The ruins of a 12th-century church located near the village (pictured inset) also indicate that the area was settled in during the early Middle Ages.

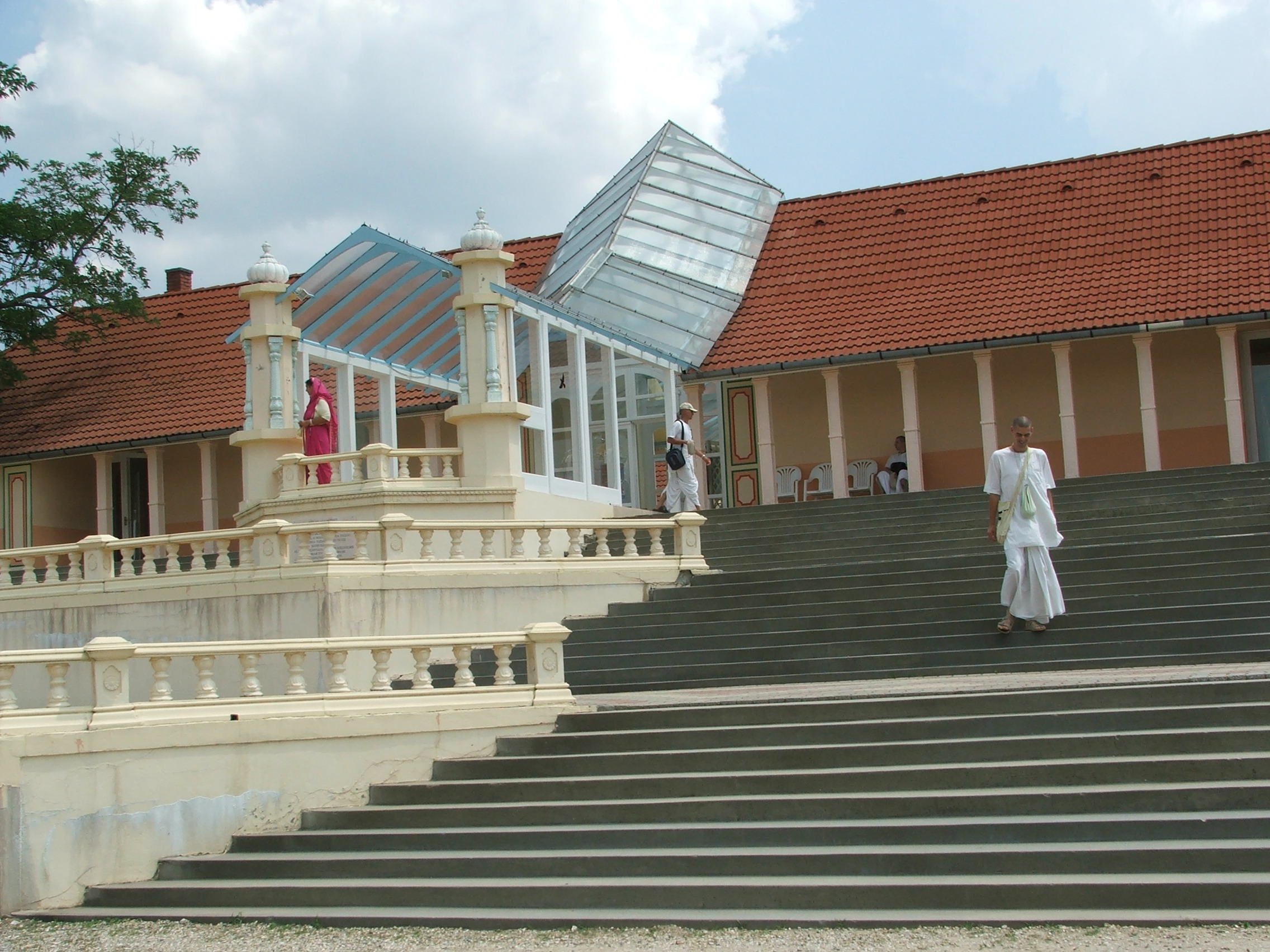
The temple of the Hare Krishnas in the Krishna valley
