= Öreglak =

- Village
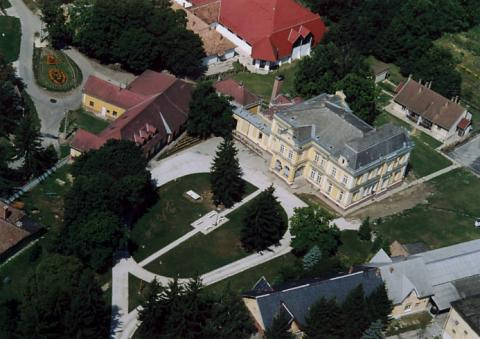
- Jankovich Mansion in Öreglak

- Location of Somogy county in Hungary

- Location of Öreglak
- Coordinates: 46.60521°N 17.62511°E
- Country: Hungary
- Region: Southern Transdanubia
- County: Somogy
- District: Fonyód
- RC Diocese: Kaposvár

Area
  - Total: 20.72 km^{2} (8.00 sq mi)

Population (2017)
  - Total: 1,502
  - Density: 72.49/km^{2} (187.7/sq mi)
- Demonym: öreglaki
- Time zone: UTC+1 (CET)
  - Summer (DST): UTC+2 (CEST)
- Postal code: 8697
- Area code: (+36) 85
- NUTS 3 code: HU232
- MP: József Attila Móring (KDNP)
- Website: Öreglak Online

Öreglak is a village in Somogy county, Hungary.

== History ==
According to László Szita the settlement was completely Hungarian in the 18th century.
