= Fonyód =

- Town
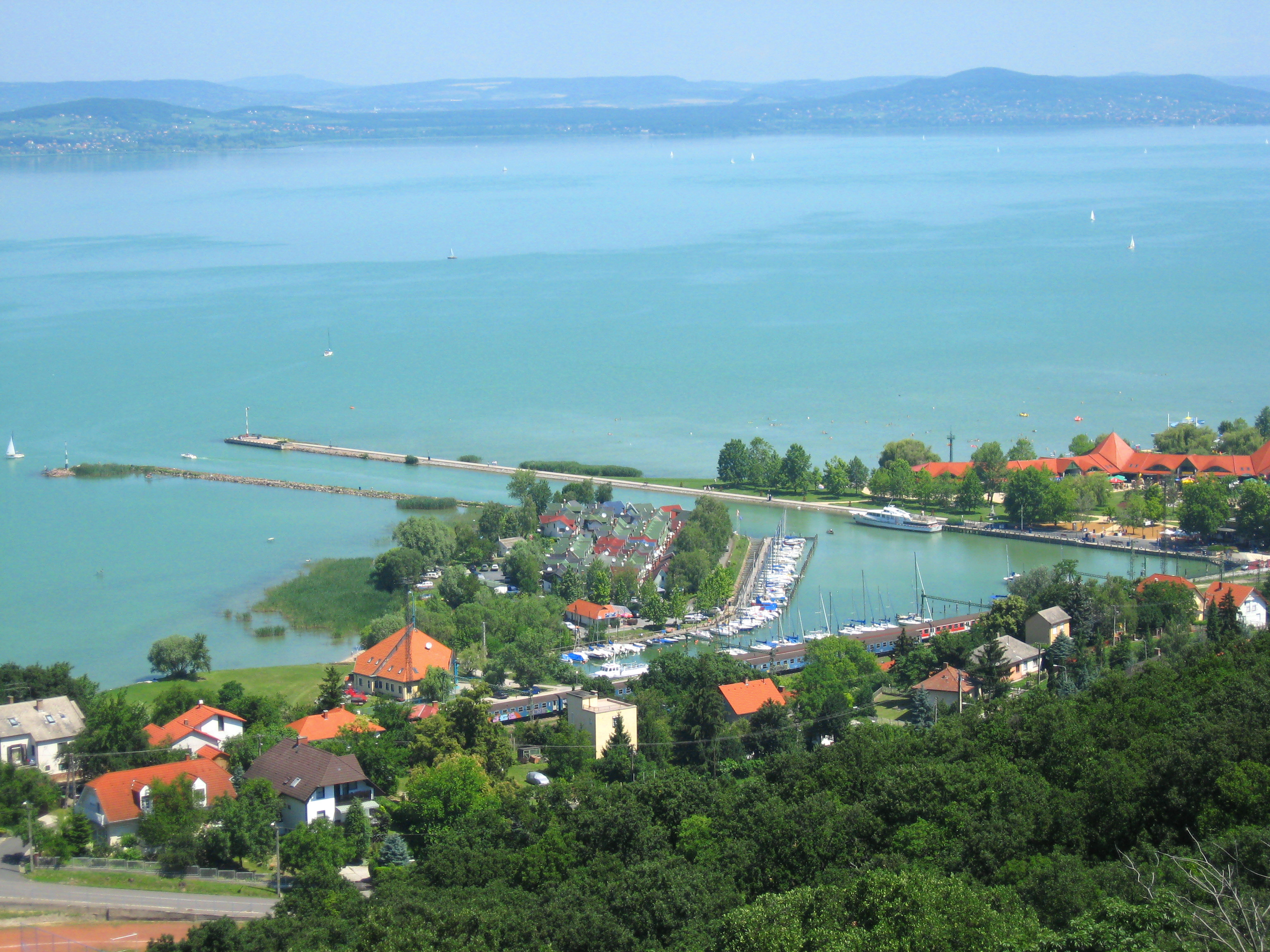
- Skyline of Fonyód

- Flag Coat of arms
- Nickname: "Town of experiences"
- Location of Somogy county in Hungary

- Location of Fonyód
- Coordinates: 46.74119°N 17.55030°E
- Country: Hungary
- Region: Southern Transdanubia
- County: Somogy
- District: Fonyód
- RC Diocese: Kaposvár
- Established: 9th century AD
- Town status: 1989

Government
  - Mayor: Barnabás Erdei (Fidesz-KDNP)

Area
  - Total: 53.55 km^{2} (20.68 sq mi)

Population (2017)
  - Total: 4,773
  - Density: 89.13/km^{2} (230.8/sq mi)
- Demonym: fonyódi

Population by ethnicity
  - Hungarians: 84.3%
  - Germans: 3.7%
  - Roma: 1.2%
  - Croats: 0.2%
  - Romanians: 0.1%
  - Greeks: 0.1%
  - Slovaks: 0.1%
  - Polish: 0.1%
  - Ukrainians: 1.1%
  - Others: 1.0%

Population by religion
  - Roman Catholic: 51.3%
  - Greek Catholic: 0.5%
  - Calvinists: 5.8%
  - Lutherans: 1.8%
  - Jews: 0.1%
  - Other: 0.8%
  - Non-religious: 13.3%
  - Unknown: 26.4%
- Time zone: UTC+1 (CET)
  - Summer (DST): UTC+2 (CEST)
- Postal code: 8640
- Area code: (+36) 85
- Patron Saint: Saint Stephen
- Motorways: M7
- Distance from Budapest: 154 km (96 mi) Northeast
- NUTS 3 code: HU232
- MP: József Attila Móring (KDNP)
- Website: Fonyód Online

Fonyód (Hungarian pronunciation: [ˈfoɲoːd]; German: Fonjod) is a town and holiday resort on the southern shore of Lake Balaton, in north-west Somogy County, western Hungary, with over 4,700 residents. It is the seat of Fonyód District.

== History ==
The first mention of Fonyód was in a letter of Saint Ladislaus from 1082, as the village Funoldi. In 1232, the village was included into the lands of the Tihany Abbey. Maps from the 14th century show Fonyód as an island (with Balaton being larger), with a castle. The castle was occupied and destroyed in 1575 during the Turkish invasion, with no one living in the village by 1580. After the Turkish occupation, Fonyód remained uninhabited until the 19th century.

The construction of a railway around Lake Balaton greatly contributed to the village's development. By 1900, Fonyód had become a holiday resort, and by 1910 over a thousand visitors were arriving each year.

Fonyód attained town status in 1989.

== Economy ==
The town is famous for its mineral water which is bottled there under the name Fonyódi and is owned by the Croatian company, Jana (part of Agrokor).

The electronics producer cms manufacturing (owned by the Austrian cms electronics) and the Italian electronics device producer Datalogic operate factories in the town.

== Notable people ==
- Csilla Molnár (1969–1986), beauty queen
- Ilona Győri (1929–2001), actress
- András Fodor (1929–1997), poet and essayist

== Twin towns – sister cities ==
Fonyód is twinned with:

- Borsec, Romania
- Krotoszyn, Poland
- Leipheim, Germany
- Mettet, Belgium
- Nové Zámky, Slovakia

== Gallery ==
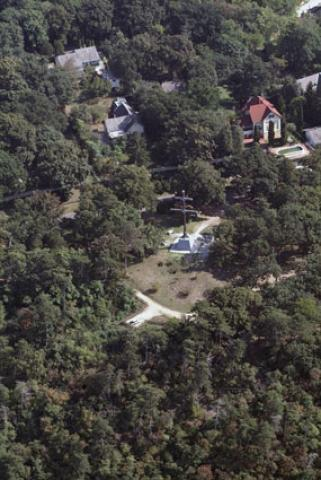

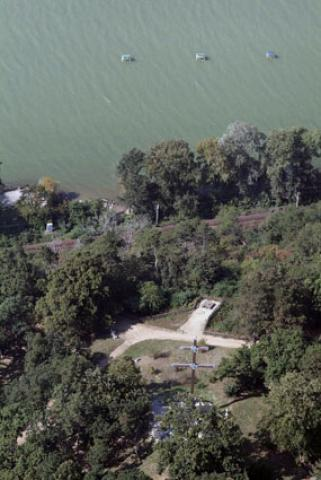

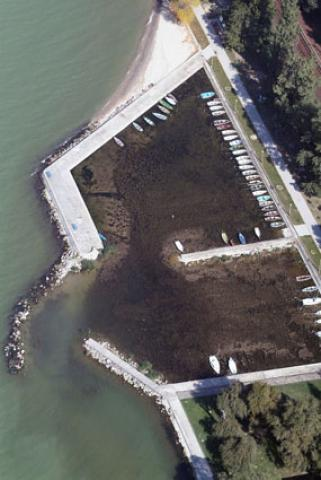

== See also ==
- Fonyód–Alsóbélatelep
