= Indiana University =

Public university system in Indiana

- Latin: Indianensis Universitas
- Motto: Lux et Veritas (Light and Truth)
- Type: Public university system
- Established: January 20, 1820; 206 years ago
- Endowment: $3.56 billion (2023) (system-wide)
- President: Pamela Whitten
- Faculty: 8,733 university-wide
- Students: 110,436 university-wide
- Undergraduates: 89,176 university-wide
- Postgraduates: 21,260 university-wide
- Location: Bloomington, Indiana; Indianapolis, Indiana; 39°10′N 86°30′W
- Campus: 3,640 acres (14.7 km^{2}) across 9 campuses
- Colors: Cream and crimson
- Website: www.indiana.edu

Indiana University locations

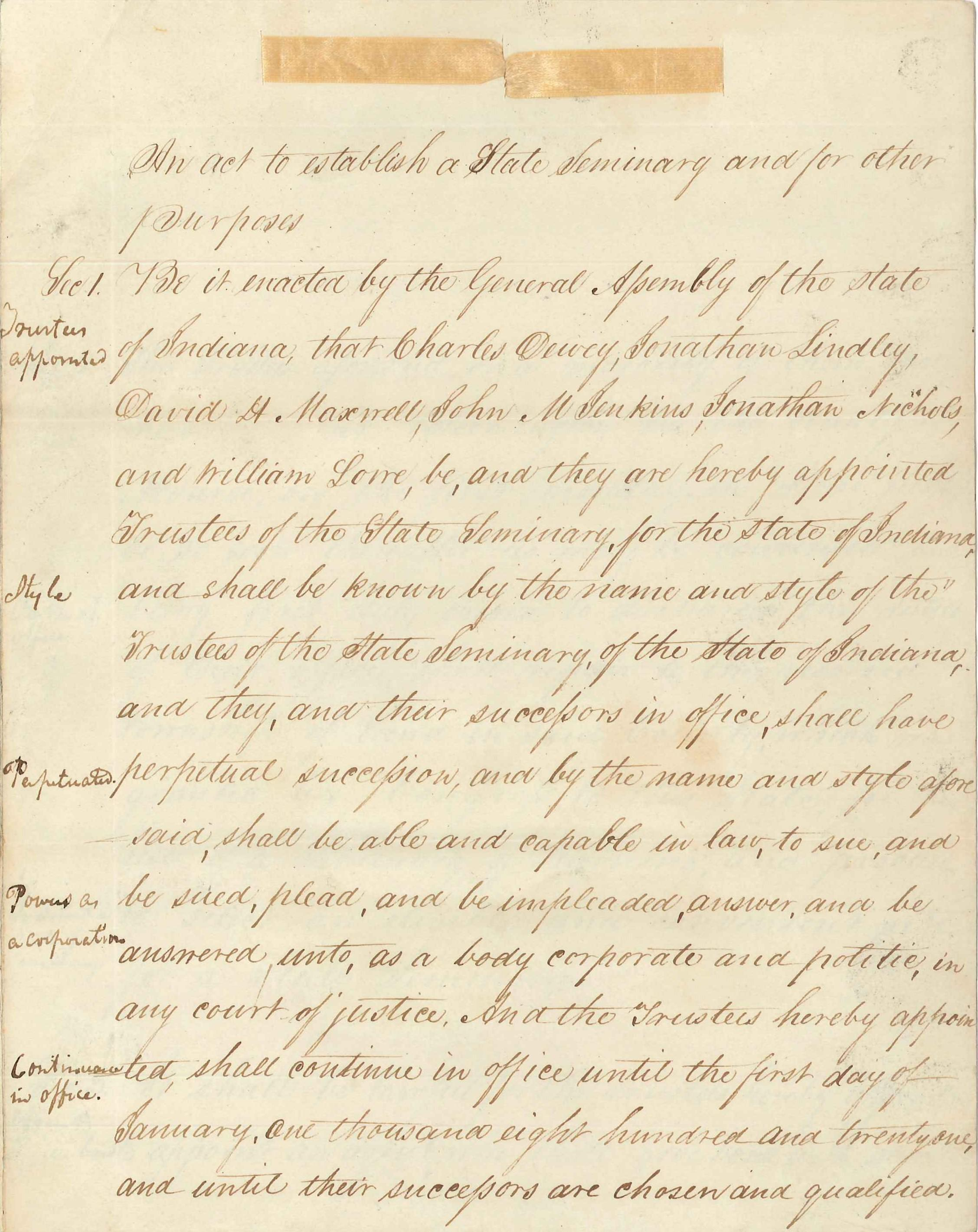
The State Seminary Act, passed by Indiana's General Assembly on January 20, 1820, to establish Indiana University

Indiana University (IU) is a system of public universities in the U.S. state of Indiana. The system has two core campuses and five regional campuses, as well as two regional centers under Indiana University Indianapolis. The system's flagship campus is Indiana University Bloomington.

== Campuses ==
=== Core campuses ===
- Indiana University Bloomington (IU Bloomington) is the flagship campus of Indiana University. The Bloomington campus is home to numerous premier Indiana University schools, including the College of Arts and Sciences, the Hutton Honors College, the Jacobs School of Music, an extension of the Indiana University School of Medicine, the Luddy School of Informatics, Computing, and Engineering, which includes the former School of Library and Information Science (now Department of Library and Information Science), School of Optometry, the O'Neill School of Public and Environmental Affairs, the Maurer School of Law, the School of Education, and the Kelley School of Business.
- Indiana University Indianapolis (IU Indianapolis or IU Indy) is Indiana's premier urban research and academic health sciences campus. The campus was established in 2024 following the breakup of Indiana University–Purdue University Indianapolis. Located just west of downtown Indianapolis, it is the central location of several Indiana University schools, including the primary campus of the School of Medicine, the School of Health and Rehabilitation Sciences, the Luddy School of Informatics, Computing, and Engineering, the School of Dentistry, the Kelley School of Business, the School of Nursing, the O'Neill School of Public and Environmental Affairs, the School of Social Work, the Herron School of Art and Design, the world's first School of Philanthropy, and the Robert H. McKinney School of Law.

=== Regional campuses ===
In addition to its core campuses, Indiana University maintains five regional campuses throughout Indiana:

- Indiana University East (IU East) established 1971, located in Richmond
- Indiana University Kokomo (IU Kokomo) established 1945, located in Kokomo
- Indiana University Northwest (IU Northwest) established 1963, located in Gary
- Indiana University South Bend (IU South Bend) established 1922, located in South Bend
- Indiana University Southeast (IU Southeast or IUS) established 1941, located in New Albany

=== Regional centers ===
There are two regional centers under the administration of IU Indianapolis:

- Indiana University Columbus (IUC), established 1970, located in Columbus. After IUPUI split in 2024, Indiana University—Purdue University Columbus was rebranded into IUC.
- Indiana University Fort Wayne (IU Fort Wayne), established 2018, located in Fort Wayne. It was established after the dissolution of the former entity Indiana University–Purdue University Fort Wayne (IPFW), which had been an extension similar to that of IUPUI under the administration of Purdue University. IU Fort Wayne took over IPFW's academic programs in health sciences, with all other IPFW academic programs taken over by the new entity, Purdue University Fort Wayne (PFW).

=== Cross-campus schools ===
The School of Medicine and the School of Social Work each have degree programs running across multiple IU campuses. The School of Medicine additionally has degree programs located at non-Indiana University system campuses, including but not limited to Purdue University's main campus in West Lafayette, Indiana State University in Terre Haute, and Ball State University in Muncie. The Kelley School of Business, the Luddy School of Informatics, Computing, and Engineering, the O'Neil School of Public and Environmental Affairs, and the School of Education each have degree programs at the IU Bloomington and IU Indianapolis campuses. The School of Nursing has degree programs at the IU Bloomington, IU Indianapolis, and IU Fort Wayne campuses. The Richard M. Fairbanks School of Public Health has degree programs at the IU Indianapolis and IU Fort Wayne campuses.

== Endowment ==
According to the National Association of College and University Business Officers (NACUBO), the value of the endowment of the Indiana University and affiliated foundation in 2016 is over $3.820 billion. The annual budget across all campuses totals over $4.5 Billion.

The Indiana University Research and Technology Corporation (IURTC) is a not-for-profit agency that assists IU faculty and researchers in realizing the commercial potential of their discoveries. Since 1997, university clients have been responsible for more than 1,800 inventions, nearly 500 patents, and 38 start-up companies.

In fiscal year 2016, the IURTC was issued 53 U.S. patents and 112 global patents.

== History ==
=== Racial integration ===
In 1895, Marcellus Neal was the first African American to graduate and earn a degree (mathematics).

In 1908, Clarence Augustus Lucas became the first African American to earn a Doctor of Medicine degree from the Indiana University School of Medicine.

In 1915, Lillian Haydon Childress Hall became the first African-American graduate of the Indiana Public Library Commission Summer School for Librarians (later the Indiana University School of Library and Information Science) and the earliest known formally trained African American librarian in Indiana.

In 1919, Frances Marshall was the first African-American woman to graduate from Indiana University (Bachelor of Arts (A.B.) degree in English).

Thirty-two years later, in 1951, Richard Davis Johnson became the first African American faculty member when he was hired as a percussion instructor.

In 1975, Deborah Lynne McCullough and Beverly J. Perkins became the first two African-American women to earn a doctor of medicine degree from Indiana University School of Medicine.

=== 21st century ===
In April 2002, thousands of IU students and staff, along with Bloomington residents, rioted across the university campus before merging into adjacent city blocks after the IU men's basketball team lost the NCAA basketball championship game to the University of Maryland Terrapins. Rioters caused extensive damage to university buildings and city businesses, and at least 45 people were arrested during the riot.

==== Sexual harassment and assault investigations ====
In March 2014, the U.S. Department of Education's Office for Civil Rights initiated a federal investigation of Indiana University's Title IX compliance, encompassing more than 450 sexual harassment and violence complaints filed with the university between 2011 and 2015. The complaints involved both students and university staff or faculty. The investigation revealed concerns with timeliness of response, lack of documentation, not preventing retaliation, and the creation of sexually hostile environments at the campus. The investigation further criticized the lack of mandatory sexual harassment, misconduct, and awareness training for staff, as well as the lack of institutional support for its Title IX Coordinator to oversee compliance by the university.

In February 2016, the university's Associate Dean of Students, Director of Student Ethics, and Title IX Deputy Director, Jason Casares, abruptly resigned his position after sexual assault allegations were made against him by Association for Student Conduct Administration president-elect, and New York University Assistant Director of Global Community Standards, Jill Creighton, during a conference in Fort Worth, Texas, in December 2015. The Fort Worth Police Department declined to press charges.

In May 2016, the U.S. Department of Education's Office for Civil Rights initiated another Title IX investigation into Indiana University for failing to hold a university student accountable for an off-campus rape of another student and failing to follow proper Title IX procedures subsequent to the reporting of the incident. The university also charged the victim a dorm-relocation fee after the suspected rapist continued to harass the victim around her dormitory, which also went without intervention by the university. The victim's case was also handled by former Title IX Director, Jason Casares, prior to his resignation amidst sexual harassment and misconduct allegations as the university's student ethics director and Title IX deputy director.

==== Gaza war protests ====
In 2023, IU's Palestine Solidarity Committee held several protests against the Gaza war. IU's Student Government treasurer and co-director of DEI resigned after accusing other student government leadership members of antisemitism and failure to represent the whole student body. The accused student body president responded by reaffirming the student government's commitment to fighting antisemitism and islamophobia and called the resignations part of "a historical pattern of undue criticism faced by Black women in positions of power." After learning of the controversy, U.S. Representative Jim Banks sent a letter to university president Pamela Whitten demanding information about pro-Palestinian protests and alleged antisemitism on campus, identifying it as a violation of the 1964 Civil Rights Act. Banks threatened the continued federal funding for the university if the conduct was tolerated by the university administration.

Also in November 2023 the university barred a faculty member from teaching after alleging that he improperly assisted the Palestine Solidarity Committee, a student group, by reserving a room for them on campus. Shortly thereafter, the university's administrators also cancelled a planned art exhibition by Samia Halaby, a Palestinian-American artist. Critics viewed these actions as unjust attempts to deliver results in response to congressional scrutiny. In the spring of 2024, the university's faculty voted no confidence in the Indiana University system president, the Bloomington campus's provost and vice provost, saying that they were "encroaching on both academic freedom and shared governance." Over 50 people were arrested while protesting in Dunn Meadow, the designated free speech area on campus.

In February 2024, the U.S. Department of Education's Office for Civil Rights again initiated a federal investigation of the university in response to a complaint of the violation of Title VI of the 1964 Civil Rights Act. The complaint alleged lack of response and complacency by the university administration to an increasing number of anti-Semitic incidents at the campus. The ACLU of Indiana also sued IU, alleging that it had violated the First Amendment rights of people banned from campus after taking part in pro-Palestinian protests.

In April 2024, IU students and faculty joined other campuses across the US in protesting against the Gaza war and the accused genocide of Palestinians. IU president Pamela Whitten made allegations of 'antisemitic episodes'. National Guard and police in riot gear broke up the student encampment and multiple arrests were made. The following academic year, after the administration brought in new policies to stop protests and limit "expressive activities", students and faculty held vigils for free speech and the Palestinian cause.

In April 2025, an IU professor was investigated under Indiana's "intellectual diversity" law after an anonymous complaint that he had discussed his arrest during a civil disobedience action at the Israeli consulate. His tenure was threatened after an administrator escalated the complaint.

== Notable alumni ==
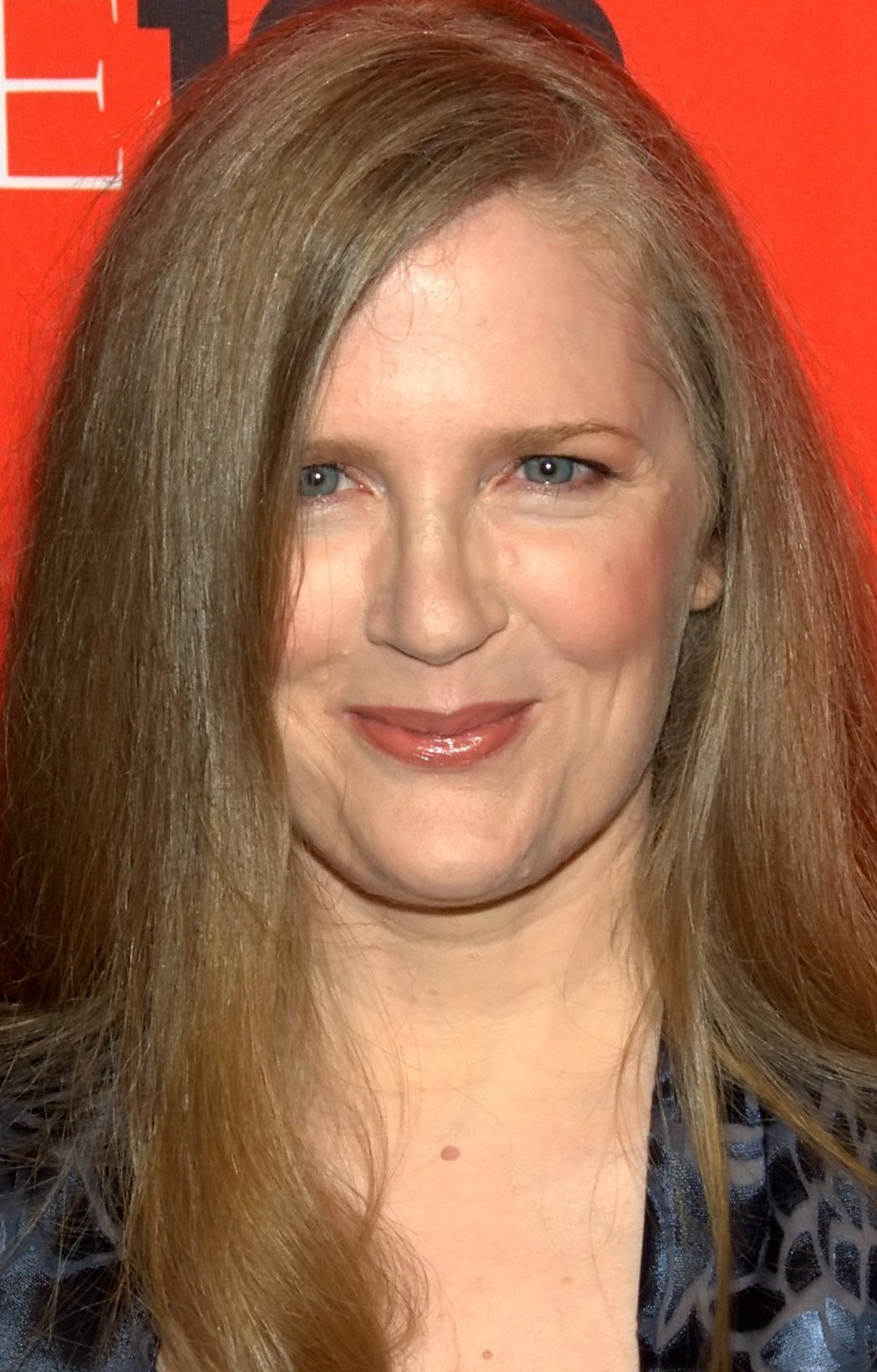
Suzanne Collins (1985), author of the Hunger Games series

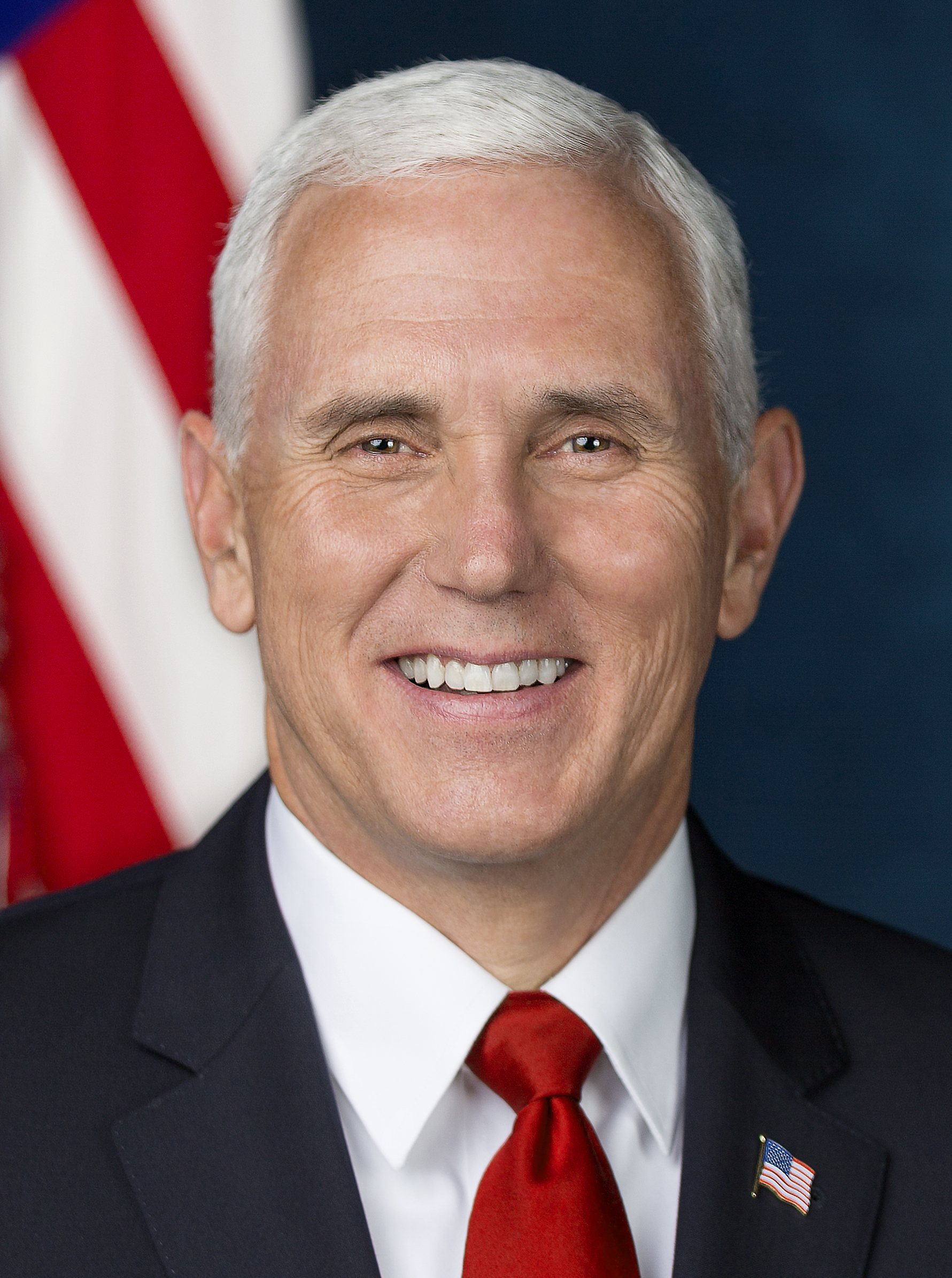
Mike Pence, 48th vice president of the United States and 50th governor of Indiana

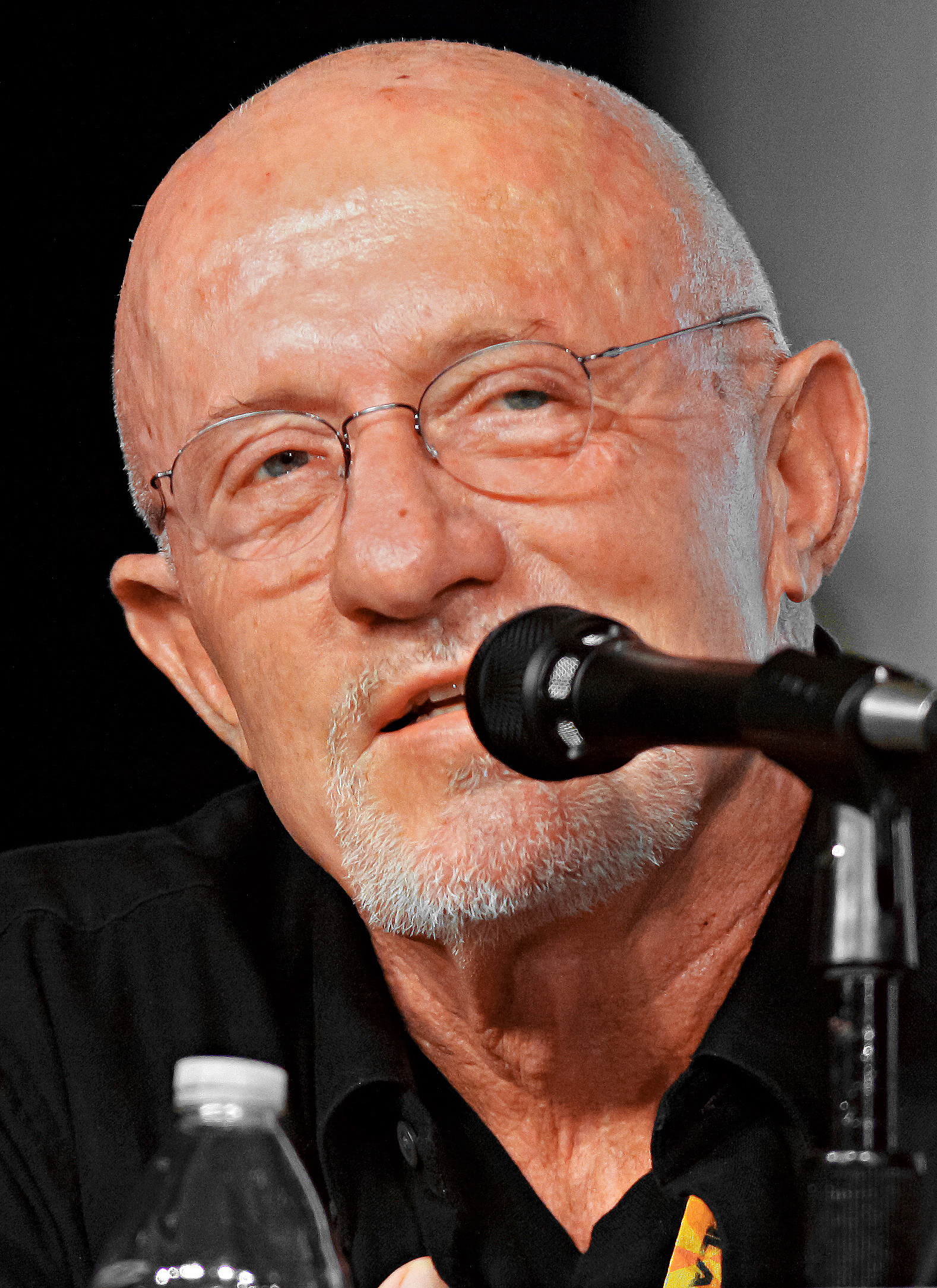
Jonathan Banks, actor known for Breaking Bad

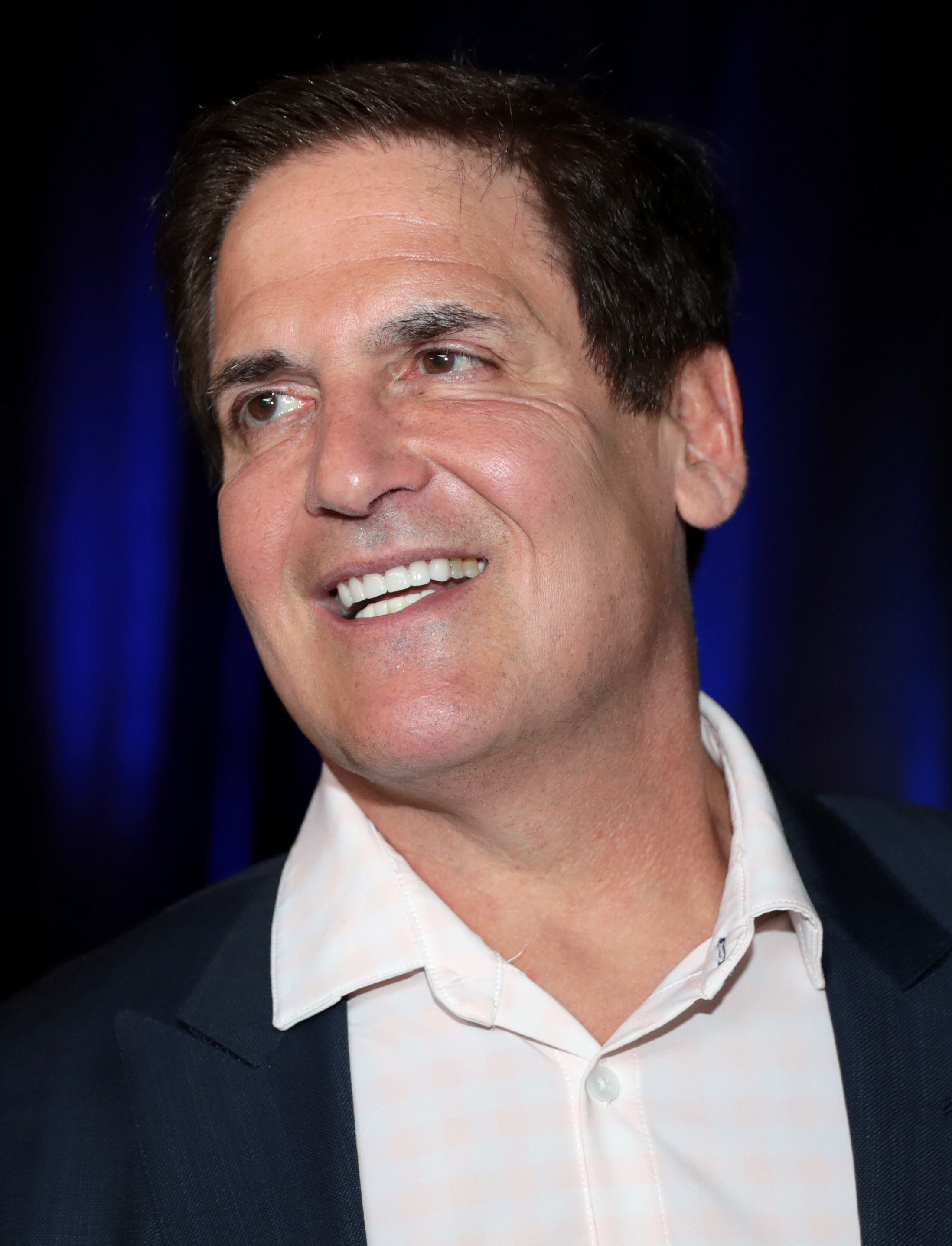
Mark Cuban, investor and entrepreneur

- Jerome Adams – anesthesiologist and 20th surgeon general of the United States
- Laura Aikin – operatic coloratura soprano
- Grace Alexander – writer, journalist, teacher
- Trigger Alpert – jazz bassist
- OG Anunoby – professional basketball player
- Howard Ashman – playwright and lyricist
- Emilie Autumn – violinist and singer
- Sima Sami Bahous – executive director of UN Women
- Agnes Nebo von Ballmoos – ethnomusicologist, choral conductor, and composer
- Jonathan Banks – actor
- David Bell – author
- Joshua Bell – violinist and conductor
- Howard Biddulph – political scientist specializing in the Soviet Union
- Jill Bolte Taylor – neuroanatomist, author, and public speaker
- James J. Brady – physicist
- Thomas Bryant – professional basketball player
- Meg Cabot – author
- Hoagy Carmichael – composer, pianist, singer, actor, and bandleader
- John T. Chambers – business executive
- Bob Chapek – business executive
- Calbert Cheaney – professional basketball player and coach
- Nicole Chevalier – operatic soprano
- Sougwen Chung – visual and performance artist
- Sarah Clarke – actress
- Suzanne Collins – author
- Laverne Cox – actress and LGBT advocate
- Mark Cuban – business executive and owner of the NBA's Dallas Mavericks
- John Cynn – professional poker player
- Mary Czerwinski – computer scientist
- Alex Dickerson – professional baseball player
- Colin Donnell – actor and singer
- Thomas P. Dooley – author, minister and research scientist
- Dorian, real name Alton Dorian Clark – hip-hop recording artist and record producer
- Michel du Cille – photojournalist
- Melerson Guy Dunham – educator, civil and women's rights activist, and historian
- Janet Foutty – business executive
- Julia Garner – actress
- George Goehl – community organizer and activist
- Neil Goodman – sculptor and educator
- Eric Gordon – professional basketball player
- Michael D. Higgins – 9th president of Ireland
- Jordan Howard – professional football player
- Lissa Hunter – artist
- Michael Husain – documentary filmmaker and producer
- Jamie Hyneman – special effects expert and television show host
- Mahmudul Islam – lawyer and former attorney general of Bangladesh
- Narendra Jadhav – economist, educationist, and writer
- William E. Jenner – politician
- Jason Jordan – professional wrestler
- Wilbur Lin – orchestra conductor
- Fred Luddy – business executive
- Nina Kasniunas – political scientist, author, and professor
- E.W. Kelley – business executive
- Justus Kelley- Miss USA 2026
- Kevin Kline – actor
- J. Lee – actor
- Victoria MacKenzie-Childs – business executive
- Judith McCulloh – folklorist, ethnomusicologist, and university press editor
- Sylvia McNair – singer
- Kristin Merscher – pianist and educator
- Christopher Mattheisen – business executive, historian, and economist
- Sherman Minton – associate justice of the Supreme Court of the United States
- Keith O'Conner Murphy – singer and songwriter
- Ryan Murphy – screenwriter, director, and producer
- Gregory Nagy – classical scholar
- Victor Oladipo – professional basketball player
- Danielle Orchard – painter
- George Coleman Osborn – historian
- Jane Pauley – journalist and television news anchor
- Mike Pence – 48th vice president of the United States; 50th governor of Indiana
- Ernie Pyle – journalist
- Marjorie Rusche – composer
- Catt Sadler – television personality
- Jay Schottenstein – business executive
- Kyle Schwarber – professional baseball player
- Will Shortz – The New York Times crossword puzzle editor
- Ranveer Singh – actor
- Tavis Smiley – talk show host and author
- James B. Smith – engineer and former U.S. ambassador to Saudi Arabia
- Mary McCarty Snow – composer
- Sage Steele – television sports anchor
- Brad Stephens – professional Australian rules football player
- Straight No Chaser – a cappella group
- Jeri Taylor – screenwriter and producer
- Miles Taylor – politician
- Isiah Thomas – professional basketball player and coach
- Randy Tobias – former administrator of USAID and business executive
- Michael E. Uslan – movie producer and educator
- Noah Vonleh – professional basketball player
- Jimmy Wales – entrepreneur and co-founder of Wikipedia
- Aaron Waltke – screenwriter and television producer
- James Watson – molecular biologist, geneticist, and zoologist; Nobel Prize winner
- Herman B Wells – eleventh president of Indiana University Bloomington and its first university chancellor
- Cody Zeller – professional basketball player

== Notable faculty ==
- Kate Abramson – Mahlon-Powell Professor of Philosophy and Director of Undergraduate Studies
- Abhijit Basu – professor of Geology; Class of 1948 Herman B Wells Endowed Professor (emeritus since 2003)
- Carolyn Begley – emerita professor of Optometry and medical researcher
- J. Peter Burkholder – distinguished professor emeritus of Musicology
- James A. Cates – associate professor of psychology
- Asher Cohen – psychologist and president of the Hebrew University of Jerusalem
- Richard DiMarchi – chairman in Biomolecular Sciences and professor of Chemistry
- Renato Dulbecco (1914–2012) – Nobel laureate and virologist
- Helen Fisher (1945–2024) – anthropologist, Senior Research Fellow at the Kinsey Institute
- Daniel P. Friedman – professor of Computer Science
- Ronald A. Hites (1942–2024) – environmental chemist and distinguished professor emeritus
- Alfred C. Kinsey (1894–1956) – biologist, professor of Entomology and Zoology, sexologist
- Salvador Luria (1912–1991) – Nobel laureate and virologist
- Hermann Muller (1890–1967) – Nobel laureate and geneticist
- Elinor Ostrom (1933–2012) – Nobel laureate and political economist
- Lisa Pratt – Provost Professor Emeritus of Earth and Atmospheric Sciences and the 7th NASA Planetary Protection officer

== Athletics ==
Both of the core campuses of the IU system sponsor NCAA Division I athletic programs. The Indiana Hoosiers represent the flagship institution in Bloomington, and have been members of the Big Ten Conference since 1899, where they compete in 23 different sports; one additional varsity sport not sponsored by the Big Ten – women's water polo – competes in the Mountain Pacific Sports Federation. The IU Indy Jaguars field 18 different sports, and have competed in the Horizon League since 2017; they were the IUPUI Jaguars before that school's dissolution.

Additionally, all but one of IU's regional campuses sponsors athletics within the National Association of Intercollegiate Athletics (NAIA). The IU Northwest RedHawks and IU South Bend Titans compete as members of the Chicagoland Collegiate Athletic Conference, while the IU Columbus Crimson Pride, IU East Red Wolves, IU Kokomo Cougars, and IU Southeast Grenadiers compete as members of the River States Conference.

== Awards ==
Indiana University has three medals to recognize individuals.

- The University Medal, the only IU medal that requires approval from the board of trustees, was created in 1982 by then IU President John W. Ryan and is the highest award bestowed by the university. It honors individuals for singular or noteworthy contributions, including service to the university and achievement in arts, letters, science, and law. The first recipient was Thomas T. Solley, former director of the IU Art Museum.
- Indiana University President's Medal for Excellence honors individuals for distinction in public service, service to Indiana University, achievement in a profession, and/or extraordinary merit and achievement in the arts, humanities, science, education, and industry. The first recipients were given to the members of the Beaux Arts Trio on September 20, 1985.
- Thomas Hart Benton Mural Medallion "recognizes individuals who are shining examples of the values of IU and the universal academic community." President Ryan was the first to award this honor. It was first awarded to distinguished international guests, at the 1986 Seminar for American and Chinese University Presidents in Indianapolis, Indiana. It honors individuals for distinction in public office or service, a significant relationship to Indiana University or Indiana, significant service to IU programs, students, or faculty, significant contribution to research or support for research.

Indiana University has several ways to recognize the accomplishments of faculty.

- Distinguished Professorships – Indiana University's most prestigious academic appointment
- University Distinguished Teaching Awards – recognizing "shining examples of dedication and excellence"
- Thomas Ehrlich Award for Excellence in Service Learning – recognizing excellence in service-learning. The recipient is also the IU nominee for the national Campus Compact Thomas Ehrlich Award for Service Learning.

== See also ==
- List of colleges and universities in Indiana
- Indiana University School of Health and Human Sciences
- Purdue University system
