= Christopher Mattheisen =

American businessman and economist

Christopher Mattheisen "Chris"
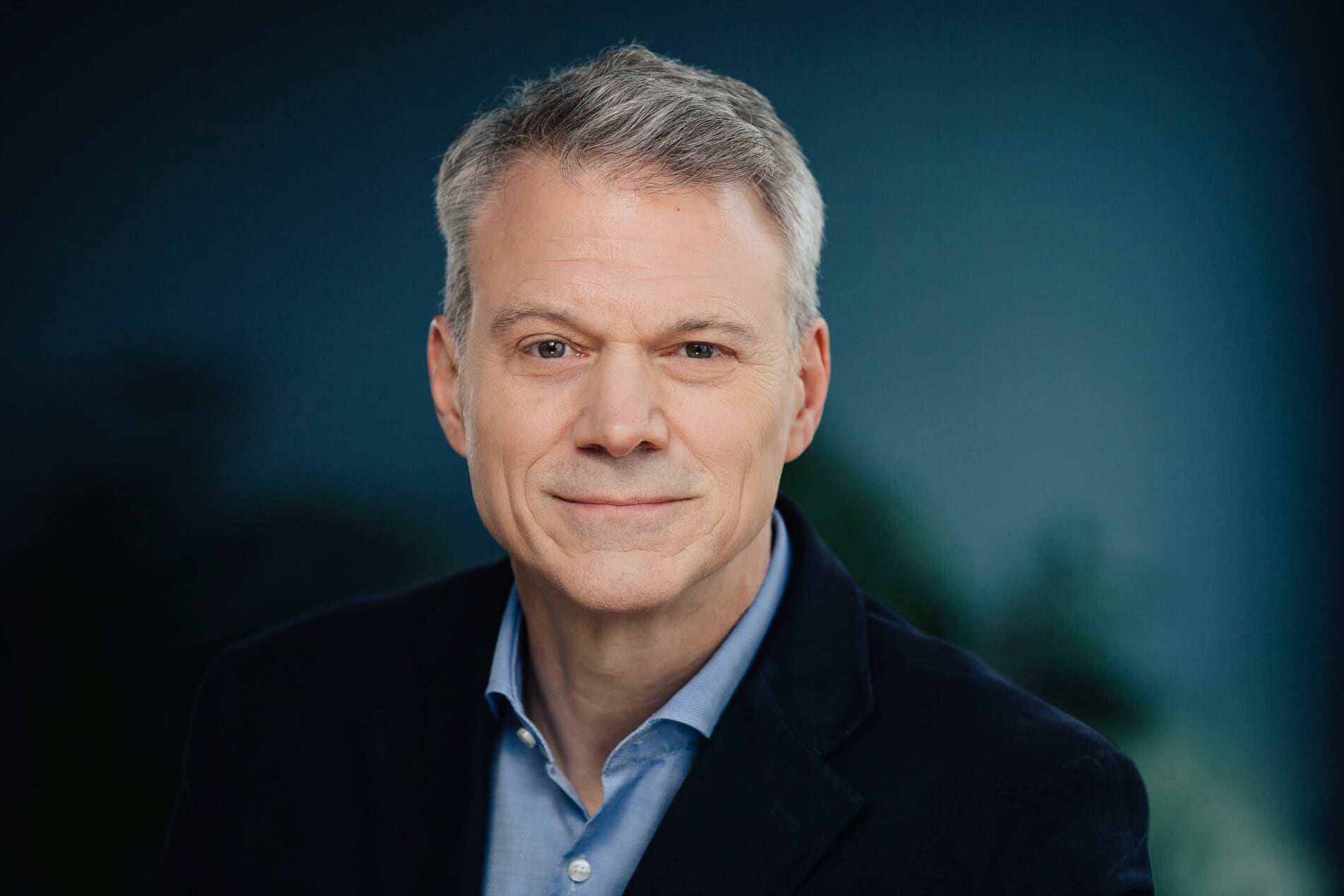
- 2019
- Born: 1961 (age 64–65); United States
- Education: Columbia University, New York City; Indiana University, Bloomington

Christopher Mattheisen (born 1961) is an American businessman and economist. He was the managing director of Microsoft Hungary from March 4, 2019. From 2006 to 2018, he was the CEO of Hungarian telecommunications company Magyar Telekom.

== Professional career ==
Mattheisen graduated in history at Indiana University Bloomington (1979–1983) and economics at Columbia University, New York (1986–1988). In 1990 he came to Hungary where he started a consulting company for business analysis and strategic planning. In 1993 he was the founding marketing and sales director of T-Mobile Hungary (formerly Westel 900). He moved on to Poland in 1996 to participate in launching the mobile operator Era GSM for US West International as Director of Marketing, Sales and Strategy. From 1997 he headed in London the marketing and sales activities of US West's (later MediaOne) European mobile subsidiaries, then from 1999 he worked at BT Cellnet as Business Marketing and Sales Director. In September 2002 he was appointed of Magyar Telekom's Chief Officer heading the Residential Services business unit and member of the Management Committee. From January 2005 to June 2006 he was Chief Officer responsible for the Wireline Services business unit (T-Com, including the residential, Internet and network divisions). On December 5, 2006 he was appointed CEO of the company as successor of Elek Straub, and on December 21 elected member and chairman of the board of directors. Under his leadership, Magyar Telekom won a string of professional awards such as Business Ethics Award (1997), Best Employer in Hungary (2009) and in Central and Eastern Europe (2010), and an international Innovation Award (2010).

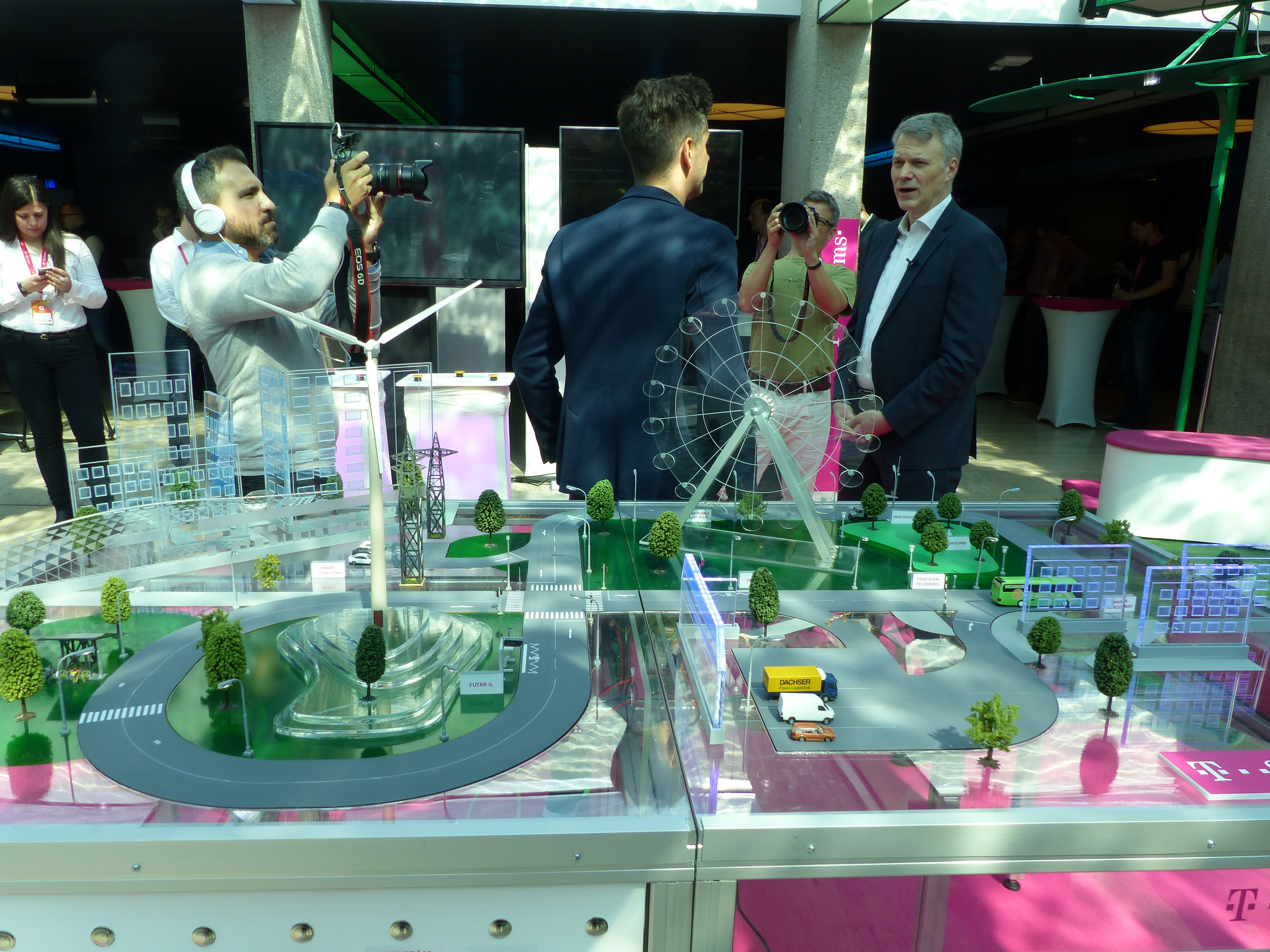
Christopher Mattheisen Hungarian Telecom (right), SMART 2017 Conference Budapest Photo: Andor Elekes

== Important milestones in his professional careers ==
- 2019 – managing director of Microsoft Hungary,
- 2006–18, Magyar Telekom Plc., CEO, member of the board of directors,
- 2013 – Magyar Telekom CEO,
- 2006–13, Magyar Telekom CEO, chairman of the board of directors,
- 2005–06, Magyar Telekom, chief officer wireline services,
- 2002–05, Magyar Telekom, chief officer residential services,
- 1999–2002, BT Cellnet, director business marketing and sales,
- 1997–99, MediaOne (US West), director marketing and sales,
- 1996–97, Era GSM, director marketing and sales and strategy,
- 1993–96, T-Mobile Hungary, (Westel 900), sales and marketing director.,

== Memberships ==
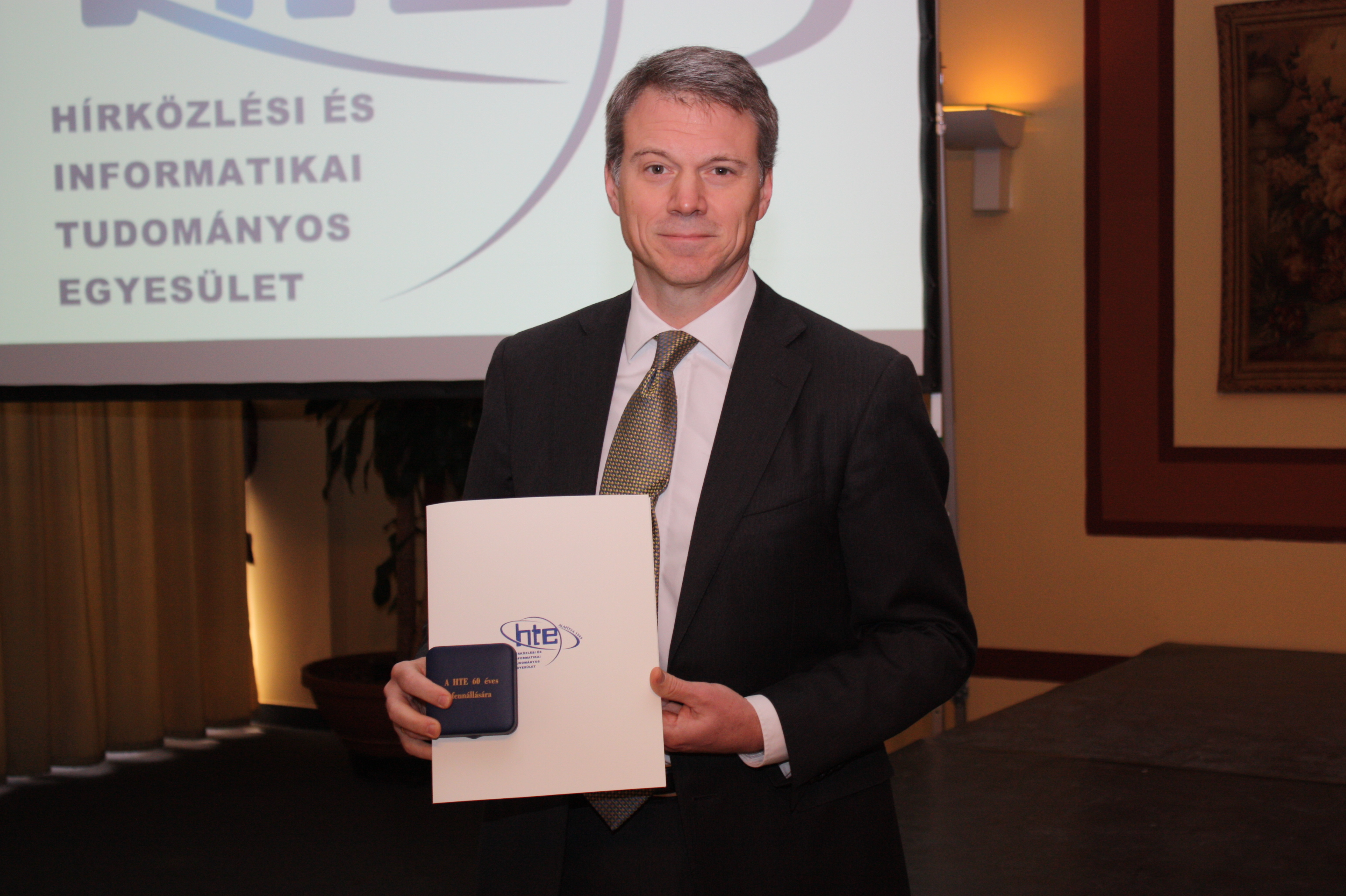
Christopher Mattheisen with an HTE Jubilee Medallion Budapest, 2009.11.04. Photo: Andras Danko

- Chairman, Magyar Telekom's board of directors,
- Member, Magyar Telekom's Management Committee,
- Member, Makedonski Telekom's board of directors,
- President, Joint Venture Association,

== Publications ==
- Hungary in the 1990s: Sowing the Seeds of Recovery, Economist Intelligence Unit, Great Britain, London, (1991), ISBN 0-85058-563-5,
- Building brand identity in Central Europe and the former Soviet Union, Economist Intelligence Unit, Great Britain, (1992), ISBN 978-0-85058-690-9.

== Lectures – conferences ==
- What are we doing to the world?, (Mit teszünk a világgal?), Internet Hungary Programme, 2009, October 13–14
- Master Course Leaders: The Successful Management of The Assets, (Vezetői mesterkurzus: Merre tart a vezető szerep? Eszközök a sikeres vezetéshez), DFT-Hungária, Budapest, 2011.
- Internet of things, BarCamp Budapest, 2011, March 30., (English),
- Business & Technology Conference, Siófok, 2011, April 13–14.,
- The continuous improvement of the competitiveness in the condition., Média Hungary 2011, May 5., Hungary, Siófok, Hotel Azur, Digital Day hall, May 3, 2011., 12:30 – 12:40., lecture.
- We have an app for that — Future of ICT and telecommunications in Hungary., International Telecommunications Society, 22nd European Regional ITS Conference, Budapest, 18 – September 21, 2011.
- AmCham Career School Series – 2nd session with Christopher Mattheisen, Chairman & CEO of Magyar Telekom Nyrt., October 6, 2011.
- Internet Hungary, October 11–12, 2011. Siófok, Hotel Azur, An Inclusive Digital World

== Interviews ==
- Xpat Interview: Christopher Mattheisen, July 24, 2015. XpatLoop,
- Policy comment: Mattheisen sees little cause for optimism, Sunday, November 13, 2011,
- Management business diary, 16. May 2011.
- Xpat Interview 2: Christopher Mattheisen, April 26, 2010. XpatLoop,
- Xpat Interview: Christopher Mattheisen, January 8, 2009. XpatLoop,

== Awards ==
- Ministerial Certificate of Merit, for the active development of Magyar Telekom, Hungary, Budapest, (2007),
- HTE Jubilee medallion, Hungary, Budapest, (2009). For his work at the Scientific Association for Infocommunications (HTE) and his sponsorship.
- "Hírközlésért Érdemérem" Hungary, Budapest, (2014), for his work in telecommunications and infocommunicationas.
- Award for the Development of the Hungarian Capital Market, Best of Budapest Stock Exchange 2018.
