= Gábor Bodó =

Hungarian volleyball player (1941–2011)

Personal information
- Nationality: Hungarian
- Born: 5 August 1941; Balatonfüred
- Died: 8 July 2011 (aged 69); Győr
- Height: 1.82 m (5 ft 11 1/2 in)
- Weight: 73 kg (161 lb)

Career
Teams
	Budapest Honvéd FC

National team
Hungary

Gábor Bodó (5 August 1941 – 8 July 2011) was a Hungarian volleyball player who competed in 1964 Summer Olympics.
