= Balatonfüred =

- Town
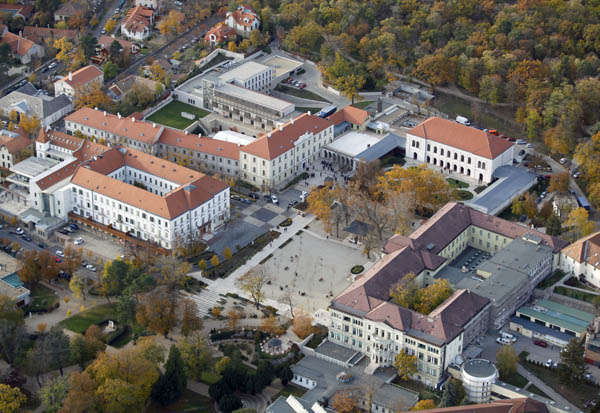
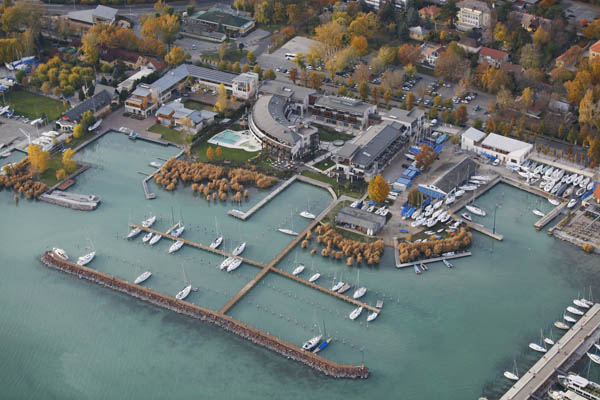

- Flag Coat of arms

- Location of Balatonfüred
- Coordinates: 46.95651°N 17.88911°E
- Country: Hungary
- County: Veszprém
- District: Balatonfüred

Government
  - Mayor: Dr. István Bóka (Fidesz-KDNP)

Area
  - Total: 46.45 km^{2} (17.93 sq mi)

Population (2017)
  - Total: 13,138
  - Density: 282.8/km^{2} (732.6/sq mi)
- Time zone: UTC+1 (CET)
  - Summer (DST): UTC+2 (CEST)
- Postal code: 8230
- Area code: (+36) 87
- Website: balatonfured.hu

Balatonfüred (Hungarian pronunciation: [ˈbɒlɒtoɱfyrɛd]; German: Bad Plattensee; Slovak: Blatenské Teplice) is a resort town in Veszprém County, in Hungary. The town with a population of 13,000 is situated on the northern shore of Lake Balaton. It is considered to be the capital of the Northern lake shore and is a yachting destination. It is also a location for fishing (carp being the most common catch) although the introduction of eels and other non-indigenous species has caused ecological damage in recent years.

== Description ==
The town has two marinas, a string of carbonated mineral water springs, listed buildings from the middle of the 18th and the 19th centuries and fine restaurants. It has modern hotels and guest-houses to accommodate about fifty thousand visitors in the summer. The nearest villages around Balatonfüred are Tihany, Aszófő, Balatonszőlős and Csopak, all renowned for their wine, land and beaches. Highway No 71 crosses the town as well as a single track railway line between Budapest and Tapolca. Although a shipyard was once the town's largest employer, now that place has been taken by the State Hospital for Cardiology. The largest industry is catering and providing boarding and other accommodations. The town has a pier, a harbour, a large camping site and several private marinas.

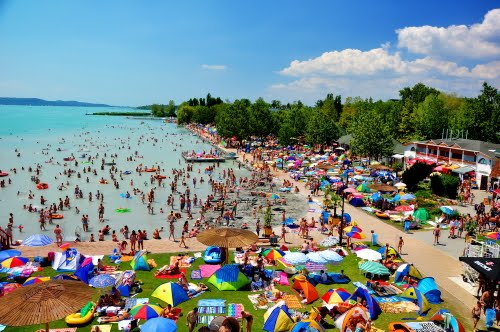
Balatonfüred beach

Visitors come for the mild micro-climate, scenery, the local wine, made of Olaszrizling grapes, and sailing and swimming facilities, as well as to revive the two-century-old tradition of socializing around spas, bathing and vacationing. The main events of the two-month-long summer holiday season include a ball for first-time visitors with a beauty contest and a wine-tasting festival, both in August.

Füred (short for Balatonfüred) has six comprehensive schools, three grammar schools, a secondary modern school for viniculture, the Lajos Loczy High School and Janos Ferencsik Music School (conservatory). A number of choirs, bands and sporting clubs are also present. The town has a local TV studio and a monthly newspaper. Füred has a newly built conference and sport centre as well.

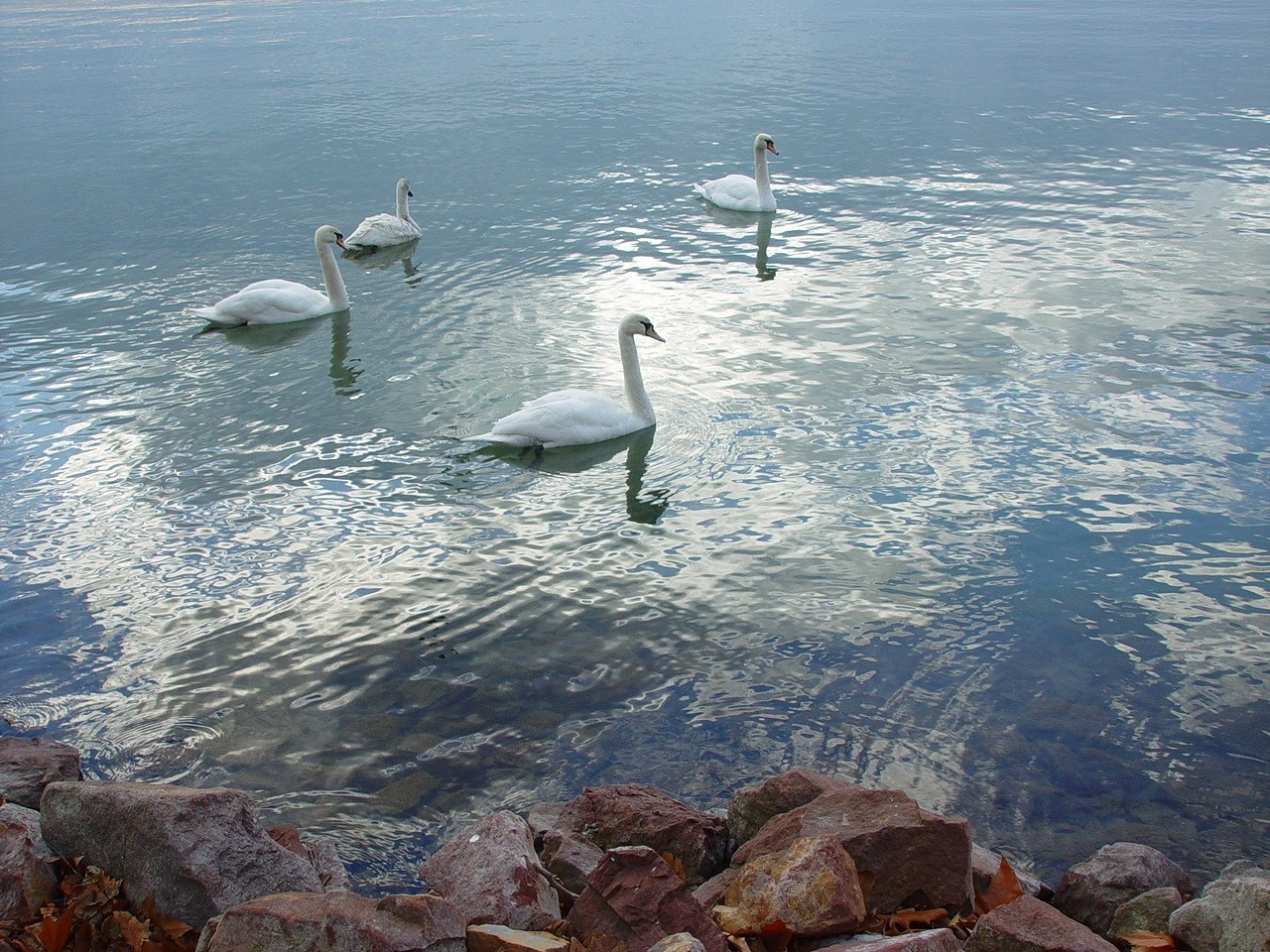
Swans on the lake. Notice the red sandstone rocks on the shore

There are three churches in the town: a typical red-sandstone Catholic church, a white Protestant church and a modern Evangelical church. A Pentecostal, American type of Christian denomination Faith Church is also active in the former Communist party headquarters.

Balatonfüred has a number of conference halls and a large clinic for heart patients. It also has a number of wine cellars that sell white house wine from the vineyards on the hillside overlooking the town and the lake.

In winter, the lake may freeze over for weeks so that skaters and ice boaters take over near the shore of the town.

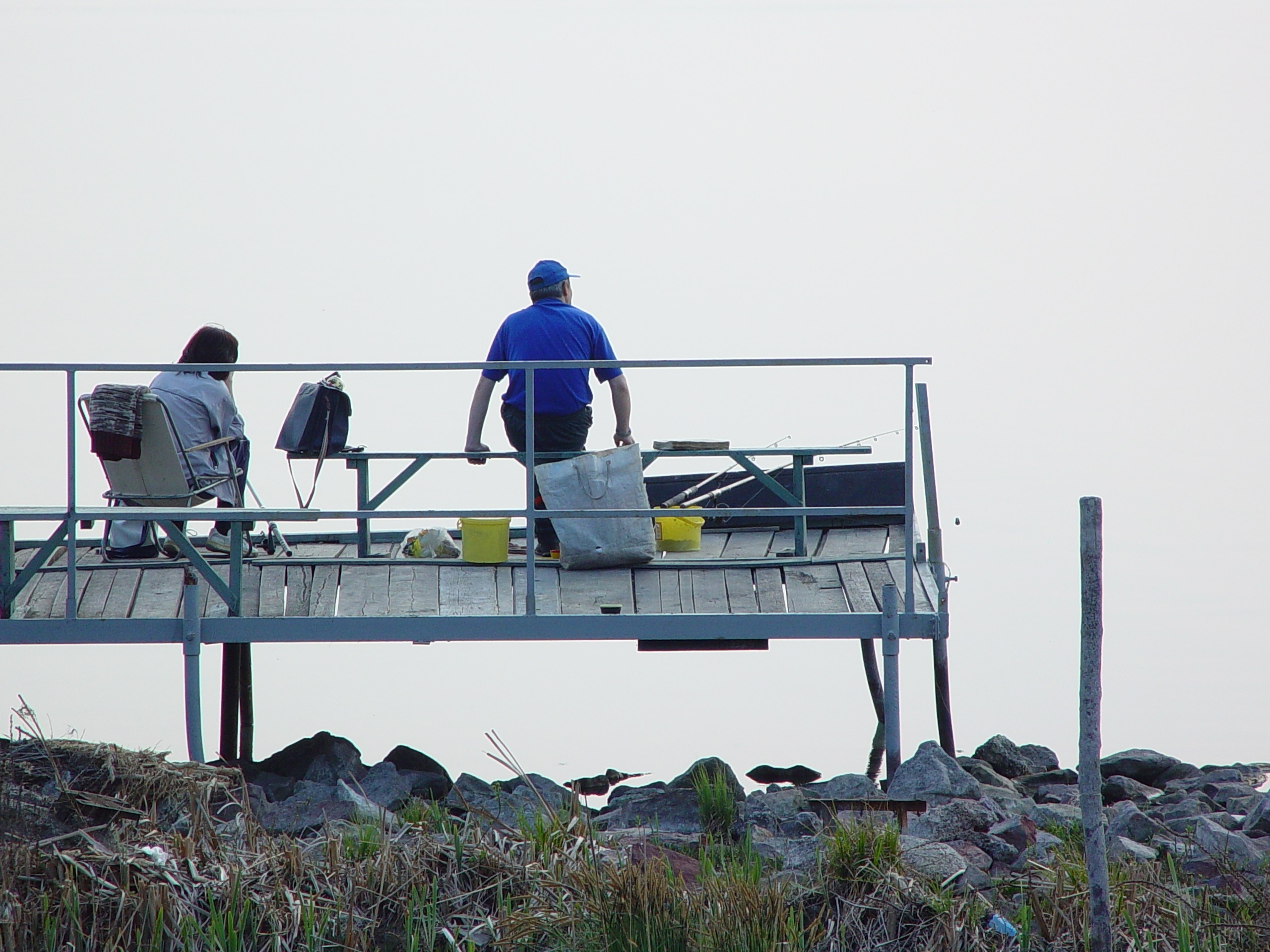
Anglers on the shore

== State Hospital for Cardiology ==
With its 429 beds the State Hospital for Cardiology in Balatonfüred boasts the largest cardiac-rehabilitation center in Hungary. The hospital is built on the lake shore and is flanked by the Tagore promenade, named after the Nobel-laureate Indian poet Rabindranath Tagore, who was treated here. Many other patients come here to heal and recuperate year-round thanks to the carbonated springs and baths, which are one of the best-known healing agents in Balatonfüred since the 17th century. The town was officially declared a spa in 1772. The Kossuth Spring and other springs near the hospital supply water containing free and bound carbon dioxide as well as iron, magnesium, potassium, hydrocarbonate, calcium, sodium, sulfur and other minerals. The temperature of the spring waters is 14 to 15 °C (57 to 59 °F) they are collected into a large basin and conducted to the spa building. Then the carbonated water is warmed up to 32 to 34 °C (90 to 93 °F) and used for treatment.

== Sights ==
- A well named after Lajos Kossuth with carbonated drinking water – see gallery below
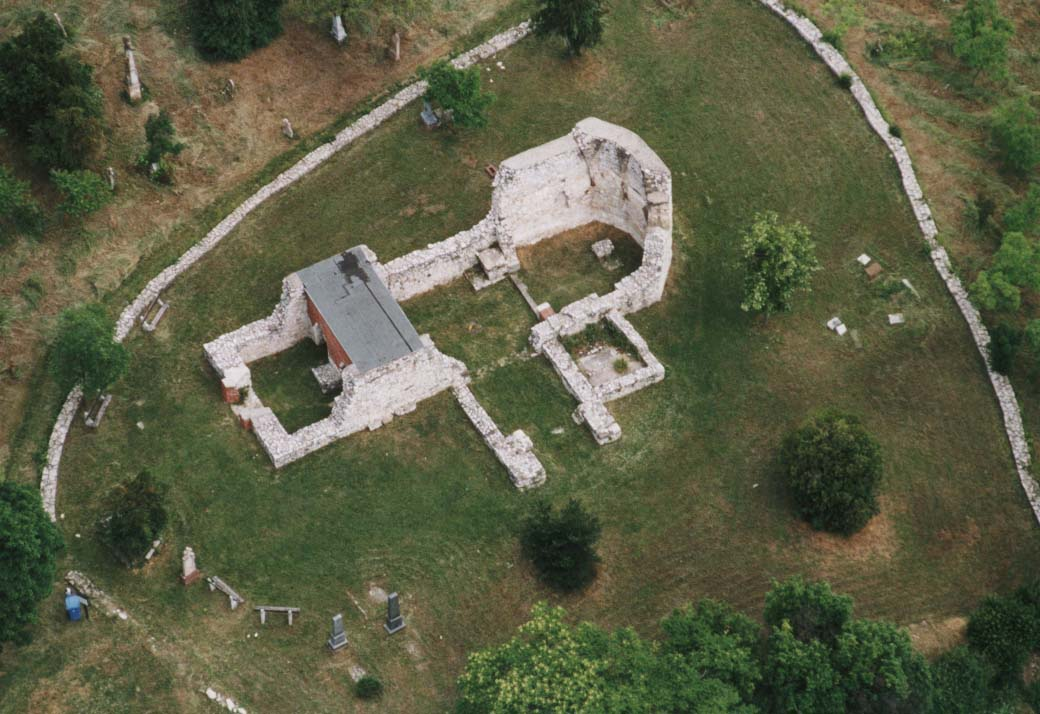
  Aerial photography: Balatonfüred, ruins
- Former classicist holiday home of actress Lujza Blaha (1816)
- The resort house of Mór Jókai
- A cave named after geologist Lajos Lóczy
- Tagore promenade
- Sundance Park, set on the site of the former Greek Quarter, houses many clubs, bars and restaurants.

== Twin towns – sister cities ==
Balatonfüred is twinned with:

- Kouvola, Finland (1988)
- Germering, Germany (1989)
- Opatija, Croatia (1996)
- Covasna, Romania (2003)
- Arpino, Italy (2006)

== Notable people ==
- Sava Babić (1934–2012), Serbian writer, poet, translator and university professor
- Dániel Berzsenyi (1776–1836), poet
- Gábor Bodó (1941–2011), volleyball player
- Bendegúz Bóka (born 1993), handballer
- Diána Detre (born 1983), windsurfer
- Ágnes Forsthoffer (born 1980), politician and businesswoman
- Áron Gádorfalvi (born 1976), windsurfer
- Rózsa Hoffmann (born 1948), politician and educator
- Zoltán Horváth (1937–2025), sabre fencer
- Pál Jávor (1902–1959), actor
- Mór Jókai (1825–1904), dramatist and novelist
- Sándor Kisfaludy (1772–1844), lyric poet
- József Manes Österreicher (1759–1831), physician
- László Passuth (1900–1979), author of historical novels and translator
- Elek Straub (born 1944), engineer, businessman and manager
- Rabindranath Tagore (1861–1941), Bengali polymath
- Kolos Ferenc Vaszary (1832–1915), cardinal of the Roman Catholic Church
- János Vörös (1891–1968), military officer, politician, Minister of Defence

== Gallery ==
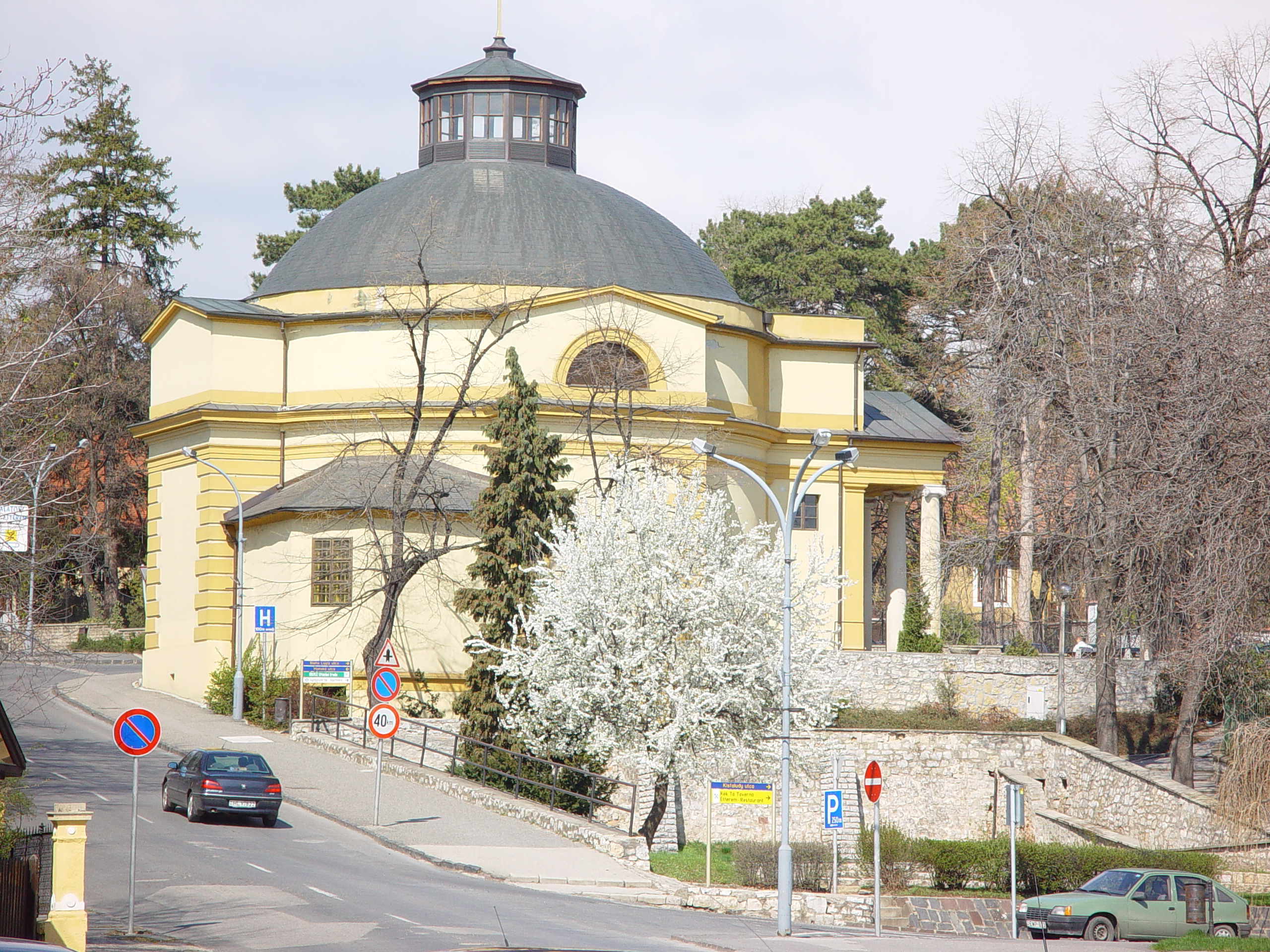

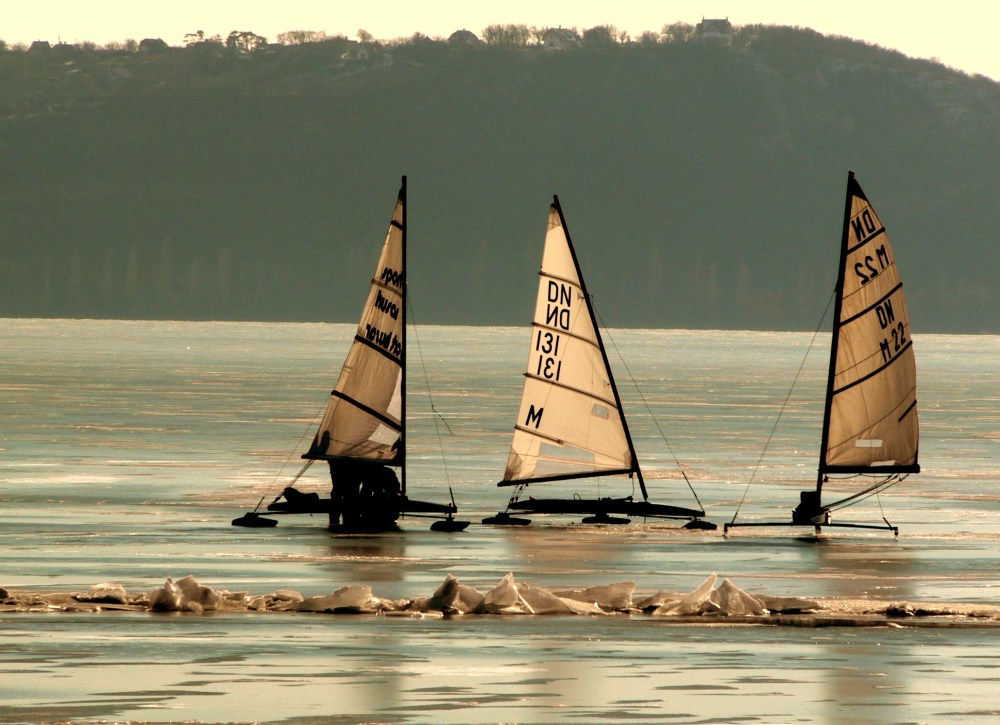

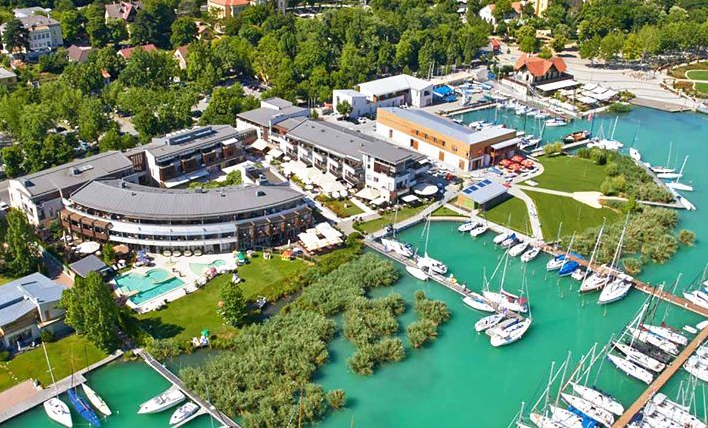

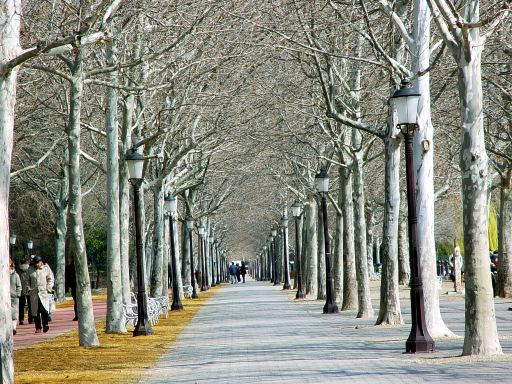

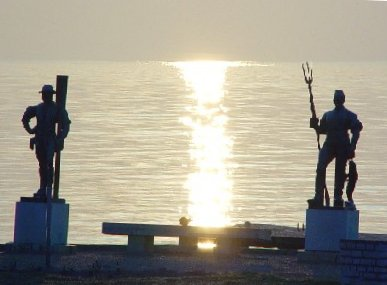

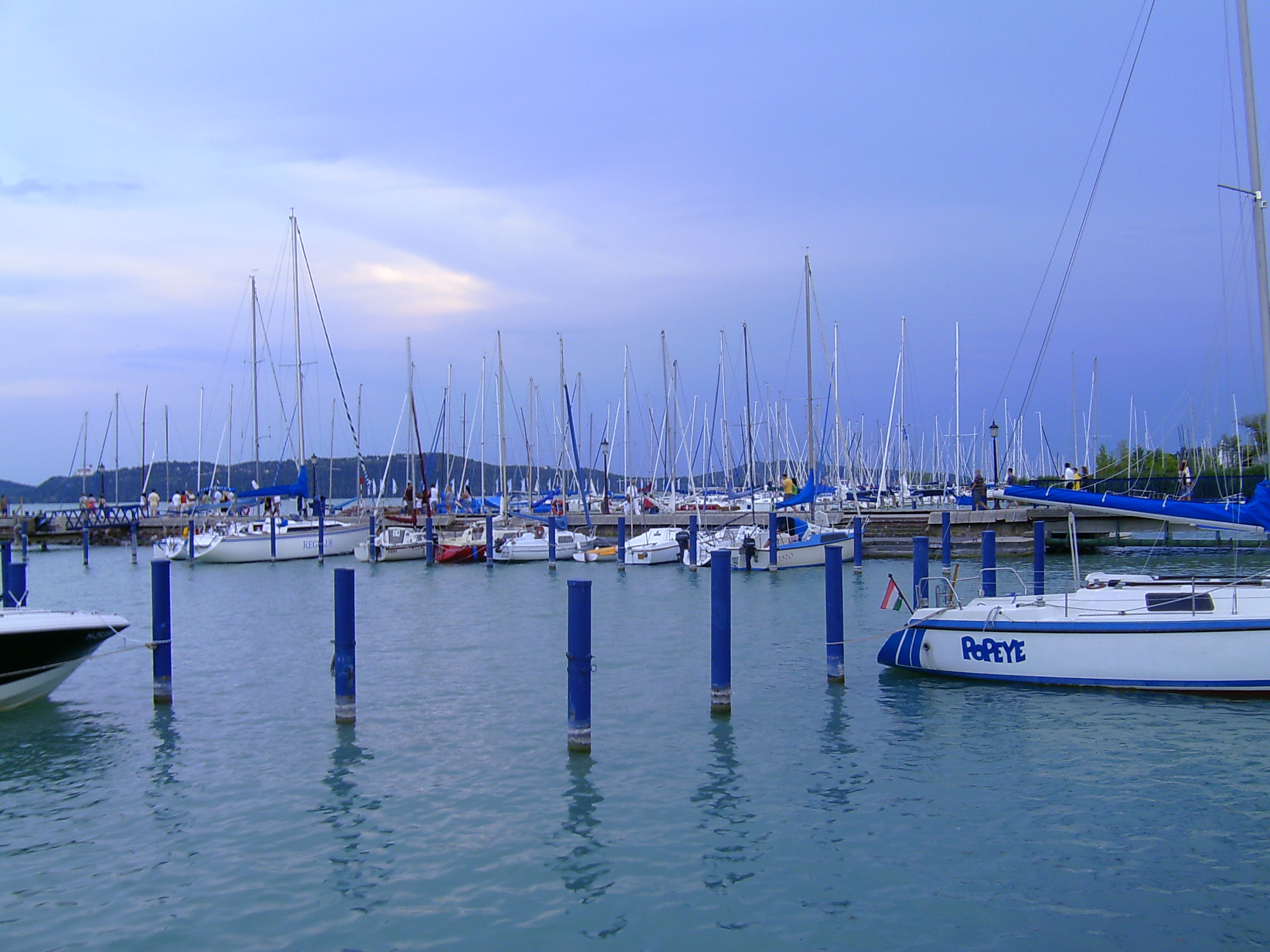

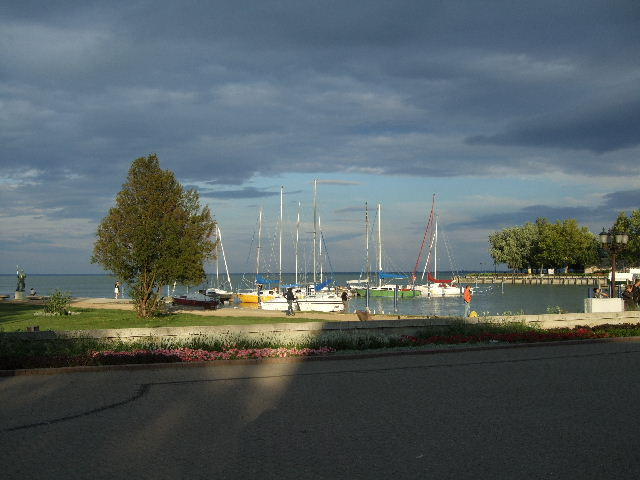

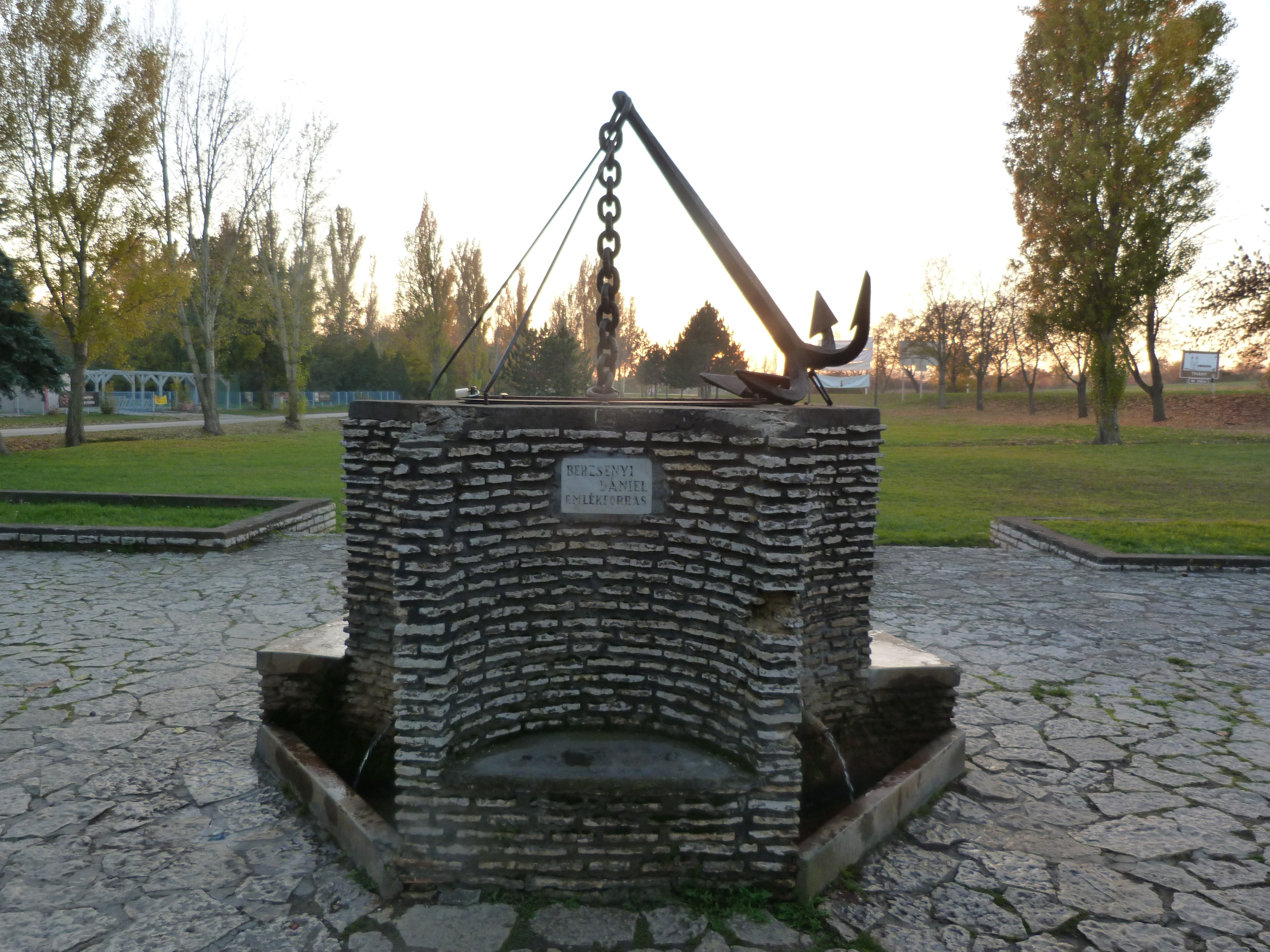

== Sport ==
The 2008 Dakar Rally finished in Balatonfüred. The race, known as the Central Europe Rally, was rescheduled and relocated race by the Amaury Sport Organisation, which postponed and relocated the original Lisbon-Dakar race to an all-central Europe race over terrorist attacks.

- Balatonfüredi FC, association football team
- Balatonfüredi KSE, handball team
