= István Bóka =

Hungarian politician

Member of the National Assembly
- In office 18 June 1998 – 5 May 2014

Personal details
- Born: 12 January 1964 (age 62) Veszprém, Hungary
- Party: Fidesz
- Children: 2
- Profession: politician

István Bóka (born 12 January 1964) is a Hungarian politician, member of the National Assembly (MP) for Balatonfüred (Veszprém County Constituency II) between 1998 and 2014. He served as chairman of the Committee on Local Government and Regional Development from 2002 to 2003. He is the mayor of Balatonfüred, since 2002.

== Personal life ==
He is married and has two children.
