= Elek Straub =

Hungarian engineer and businessman (born 1944)

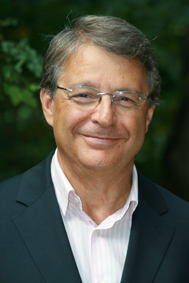
- Elek Straub in 2009
- Born: 19 October 1944 (age 82); Balatonfüred, Hungary
- Citizenship: Hungarian
- Education: Budapest University of Technology and Economics
- Occupations: former Manager (IT Department of KSH) former CEO (Magyar Telekom) (1995-2006); President (Hungarian Yachting Association) (2004-); President (Német-Magyar Ipari és Kereskedelmi Kamara) (2003–2007)
- Board member of: Munkaadók és Gyáriparosok Országos Szövetsége; C3 Kulturális és Kommunikációs Központ Alapítvány; Graphisoft (2007-2009); Economical Advisory Board of the Budapest University of Technology and Economics
- Children: Dániel; Fanni

Elek Straub (born November 19, 1944, in Balatonfüred/ Hungary) is a Hungarian engineer, consultant, investor, philanthropist and businessman, known as former president and CEO of Magyar Telekom.

== Biography ==
Born in Balatonfüred, Straub obtained his MS in Electrical Engineering from the Budapest University of Technology and Economics in 1968, where he continued his postgraduate studies in business administration from 1970 to 1972.

After his graduation Straub started his career in 1970 at the Enterprise Computing Center of the Ministry of Labour, where he became Head of the department. From 1980 to 1990 he was Head of the Computing Main Department and then Vice President of the Hungarian Central Statistical Office, and from 1990 to 1995 Country General Manager (CEO) for IBM Hungary. In 1995 he was appointed CEO of MATAV, which was Magyar Telekom in 1996. He served as its chairman and CEO until 2006, and was succeeded by Christopher Mattheisen.

After his retirement at Magyar Telekom, he has been President of the Hungarian Yachting Association from 2007 to 2012, and since 2010 is chairman of the board and Managing Partner of Day One Capital.

== Selected publications ==
- Elek, Straub, and Tolnai György. A Külföldi Folyóiratok Központi Katalógusának számítógépes rendszere. Budapest: OSZK (1982).
- Straub, Elek. "IN HUNGARY." The Impact of New Technologies on Information Systems in Public Administration in the 80s: Proceedings of the First International IFIP Conference on Governmental and Municipal Data Processing, Vienna, Austria, 23–25 February 1983. North Holland, 1983.
- Kovács, Péter, and Elek Straub, (eds.) Governmental and Municipal Information Systems: Proceedings of the IFIP TC8 Conference on Governmental and Municipal Information Systems, Budapest, Hungary, September 8–11, 1987. Vol. 1. North Holland, 1988.
