= Indiana University School of Health and Human Sciences =

School of health sciences in the U.S. state of Indiana

Indiana University Indianapolis School of Health & Human Sciences
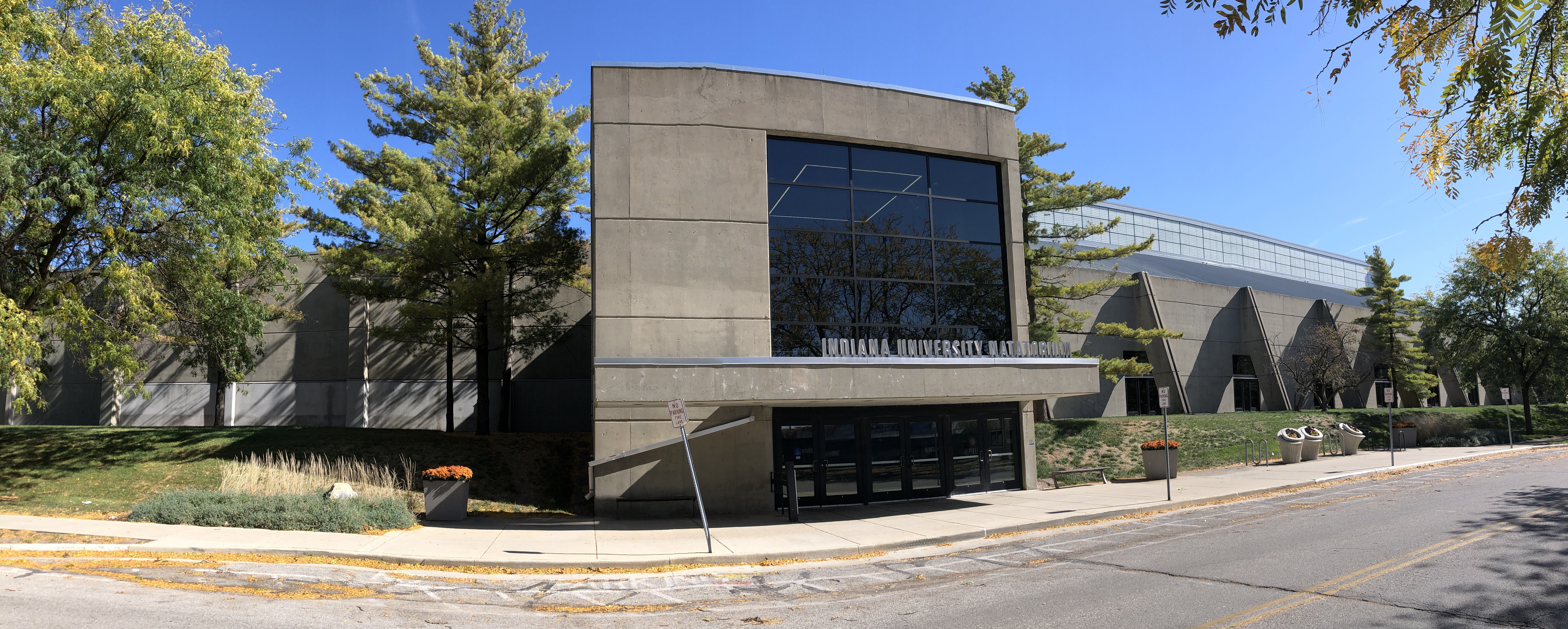
- Natatorium
- Type: Public
- Established: 2018; 8 years ago
- Parent institution: Indiana University Indianapolis
- Undergraduates: 885 (Spring 2024)
- Postgraduates: 103 (Spring 2024)
- Doctoral students: 262 (Spring 2024)
- Location: Indianapolis, Indiana, U.S.
- Campus: Urban
- Absorbed: School of Physical Education and Tourism Management; School of Health and Rehabilitation Sciences (2018)
- Website: shhs.iupui.edu

The Indiana University School of Health & Human Sciences (SHHS) is an academic health sciences school located on the Indiana University Indianapolis campus. SHHS offers academic degrees in exercise science, fitness management and personal training, physical education teaching, nutrition and dietetics, physical therapy, health sciences, occupational therapy, physician assistant studies, sports management, and tourism, conventions, and event management. The school also manages the campus military science (ROTC) program and the university's Camp Brosius.

== History ==
SHHS was established due to a merger in 2018 between the School of Physical Education and Tourism Management and the School of Health and Rehabilitation Sciences.

The School of Health and Rehabilitation Sciences originated with the creation of allied health programs in the Indiana University School of Medicine in 1941. In 1951, all of the allied health programs were placed in a Division of Allied Health Sciences, which was administered separately from the medical school. By the 1980s, the Division of Allied Health Sciences offered degrees such as dietetics, anesthesiology, health administration, respiratory therapy, radiological technology, physical therapy, occupational therapy, medical technology, medical record administration, and cytotechnology. In 1991, allied sciences separated from the medical school to become the School of Allied Health Sciences, which was then renamed the School of Health and Rehabilitation Sciences in 2003.

The School of Physical Education and Tourism Management was the first school at Indiana University Purdue University Indianapolis (IUPUI, predates IU Indianapolis), and the first existing program in the United States that trained students to become physical education teachers. The school originated in 1866 in New York City as the Normal College of the American Gymnastic Union. The school subsequently moved to Chicago in 1871, relocated to Milwaukee, and then settled in Indianapolis in 1907. The Normal College joined Indiana University in 1941, and was renamed the School of Physical Education in 1972 to reflect the school's mission of training physical education teachers. In 1994, the school expanded its focus to include IUPUI's military science program and the Department of Tourism, Conventions, and Event Management. The school established the first university institute focusing on sports innovation.

== Academics ==
The school offers undergraduate degrees in exercise science; physical education teacher education; fitness management and personal training; health sciences; tourism, conventions, and event management; and sports management. It also offers 4+1 degrees in sports analytics and health sciences. Master's and doctoral-level programs are offered in exercise science, health and rehabilitation studies, occupational therapy, physical therapy, physician assistant studies, and nutrition and dietetics.

== Notable people ==
=== Faculty ===
- Rafael Bahamonde, Founding Dean of the School of Health & Human Sciences
- P. Nicholas Kellum, Dean, School of Physical Education
- Lola L. Lohse, Dean, School of Physical Education
- Rebecca Porter, Interim Dean, School of Health and Rehabilitation Sciences
