= Carolyn Begley =

American optometrist

Carolyn G. Begley
- Occupations: Optometrist, Researcher
- Known for: Research on dry eye syndrome and corneal staining
- Title: Emerita Professor of Optometry
- Awards: Garland M. Clay Award; Max Schapero Memorial Lecture Award

Academic background
- Education: Indiana University Bloomington (MS, OD)

Academic work
- Discipline: Optometry
- Institutions: Indiana University Bloomington

Carolyn G. Begley, OD, MS, FAAO is Emerita Professor of optometry at Indiana University Bloomington. She holds an M.S.(1979) and O.D. (1983) from Indiana University Bloomington. She has been the recipient of several awards, such as the Garland M. Clay Award from the American Academy of Optometry for her most cited paper, “Characteristics of corneal staining in hydrogel contact lens wearers” and the Max Schapero Memorial Lecture Award, also from the AAO. She is a Fellow of the AAO. As an NIH-funded researcher, she participated in a Congressional briefing on dry eye syndrome therapies. According to the Web of Science, she has published over 80 articles in peer-reviewed medical journals that, as of September 2013, had been cited more than 1100 times, giving her an h-index of 19.
