= Nina Kasniunas =

American political scientist and professor

- Born: Nina Therese Kasniunas; February 19, 1972 (age 54); Michigan City, Indiana
- Education: Indiana University Bloomington BA 1995; Loyola University Chicago MA 2002, PhD 2009
- Spouse: Andy Gruver
- Scientific career
- Fields: Political science
- Workplaces: Goucher College
- Thesis: Impact of Interest Group Testimony on Lawmaking in Congress (2009)
- Doctoral advisor: Raymond Tatalovich
- Other academic advisors: Richard Matland

Nina Therese Kasniunas (born February 19, 1972) is an American political scientist and writer. She is the Arsht Professor in Ethics and Leadership in the Center for People, Politics, & Markets at Goucher College.

== Early life and education ==
Kasniunas was born in 1972. She earned a bachelor's degree from Indiana University Bloomington in 1995. She completed a master's degree in 2002 at Loyola University Chicago where she earned a doctorate in political science in 2009. She completed her dissertation titled Impact of Interest Group Testimony on Lawmaking in Congress under doctoral advisor Raymond Tatlovich.

== Career ==
In 2011, Kasniunas began teaching as an assistant professor at Goucher College in the department of political science and international relations. Although not originally from Maryland, she is known for connecting students with the Baltimore City community through fieldwork and research. Kasniunas is the Arsht Professor in Ethics and Leadership in the Center For People, Politics, & Markets at Goucher College.

Kasniunas' research focused on American politics, civic engagement, and innovative teaching. Her early work, starting in 2007, examined the influence of interest groups in U.S. Congress, including their access to congressional hearings and impact on policymaking. She also explored the role of presidential administrations as organized interests in legislative processes. In 2007 and 2008, she published works on U.S. president George W. Bush’s judicial restraint and the role of media in civil liberties, setting the foundation for her focus on campaign dynamics and interest groups.

In 2010, Kasniunas co-authored Campaign Rules: A 50 State Guide to Campaigns and Elections in America, and she continued to study campaign strategies with Mark Rozell, contributing to multiple editions of Campaigns on the Cutting Edge. Around this time, her interest in teaching methodologies grew. She published on re-enactment theatre as a tool for teaching U.S. Supreme Court cases and collaborated on works addressing collaborative learning and civic education, which she presented at numerous conferences from 2011 to 2013.

By 2014, Kasniunas was further integrating team-based learning into her teaching, exploring gendered rhetoric in politics, and examining the impact of digital activism. Her later career included panels on supporting political learning and engagements such as speaking on racial justice within the two-party system. Through her research, publications, and public speaking, Kasniunas has consistently contributed to the fields of political science education and civic engagement, fostering new approaches to learning and participation in American political life.

Kasniunas has served on the admissions committee and as an adviser in the development in the Goucher College Video App, a new digital format for students to apply for acceptance at the institution.

== Awards ==
In 2017, Kasniunas received the All IN Campus Democracy Challenge Champion Award for her efforts to increase student voting rates.

== Selected works ==
=== Books ===
- Kasniunas, Nina; Shea, Daniel M. (2010). Campaign Rules: A 50-State Guide to Campaigns and Elections in America. Rowman & Littlefield Publishers, Inc. ISBN 978-1442201774. "Nina Kasniunas."

=== Articles ===
- Kasniunas, Nina (2009). Impact of Interest Group Testimony on Lawmaking in Congress (PhD thesis). Loyola University Chicago.
- Tatalovich, Raymond; Daynes, Byron W. (December 15, 2010). "Chapter 3: Gay Rights: Nature or Nurture?". In Kasniunas, Nina; Ellis, Margaret E. (eds.). Moral Controversies in American Politics. New York: Routledge. pp. 80–109. ISBN 9781317464426.
- Kasniunas, Nina (2012). "Experiencing Mayoral Elections Through Exit Polling: Any Professor Can Design this Course". APSA 2012 Teaching & Learning Conference Paper. doi:10.2139/ssrn.1997685.
- Kasniunas, Nina (2014). "Connecting Classrooms for Collaborative Learning". The Common Good: A SUNY Plattsburgh Journal on Teaching and Learning. 2 (1).
