= Képespuszta =

- Location of Baranya county in Hungary

- Location of Képespuszta
- Coordinates: 46.102001°N 18.020014°E
- Country: Hungary
- County: Baranya

Area
  - Total: 32.15 km^{2} (12.41 sq mi)

Population (2004)
  - Total: 20
- Time zone: UTC+1 (CET)
  - Summer (DST): UTC+2 (CEST)

Képespuszta (Hungary) is an area in the village of Szentkatalin in Baranya county, near Orfű, Pécs.
