= Keresztespuszta =

- Village
- Interactive map of Keresztespuszta
- Coordinates: 45°58′09″N 18°10′07″E
- Country: Hungary
- County: Baranya

Population (2022)
  - Total: 26
- Time zone: UTC+1 (CET)
  - Summer (DST): UTC+2 (CEST)

Keresztespuszta is a village in Baranya county, Hungary.
