= Szörény (village) =

- Village (Falva)
- Interactive map of Szörény
- Coordinates: 45°58′N 17°41′E
- Country: Hungary
- County: Baranya
- Time zone: UTC+1 (CET)
  - Summer (DST): UTC+2 (CEST)

Szörény is a village in Baranya county, Hungary.

== History ==
According to László Szita the settlement was completely Hungarian in the 18th century.
