= Baranya County =

County of Hungary

Baranya County Baranya megye
- County
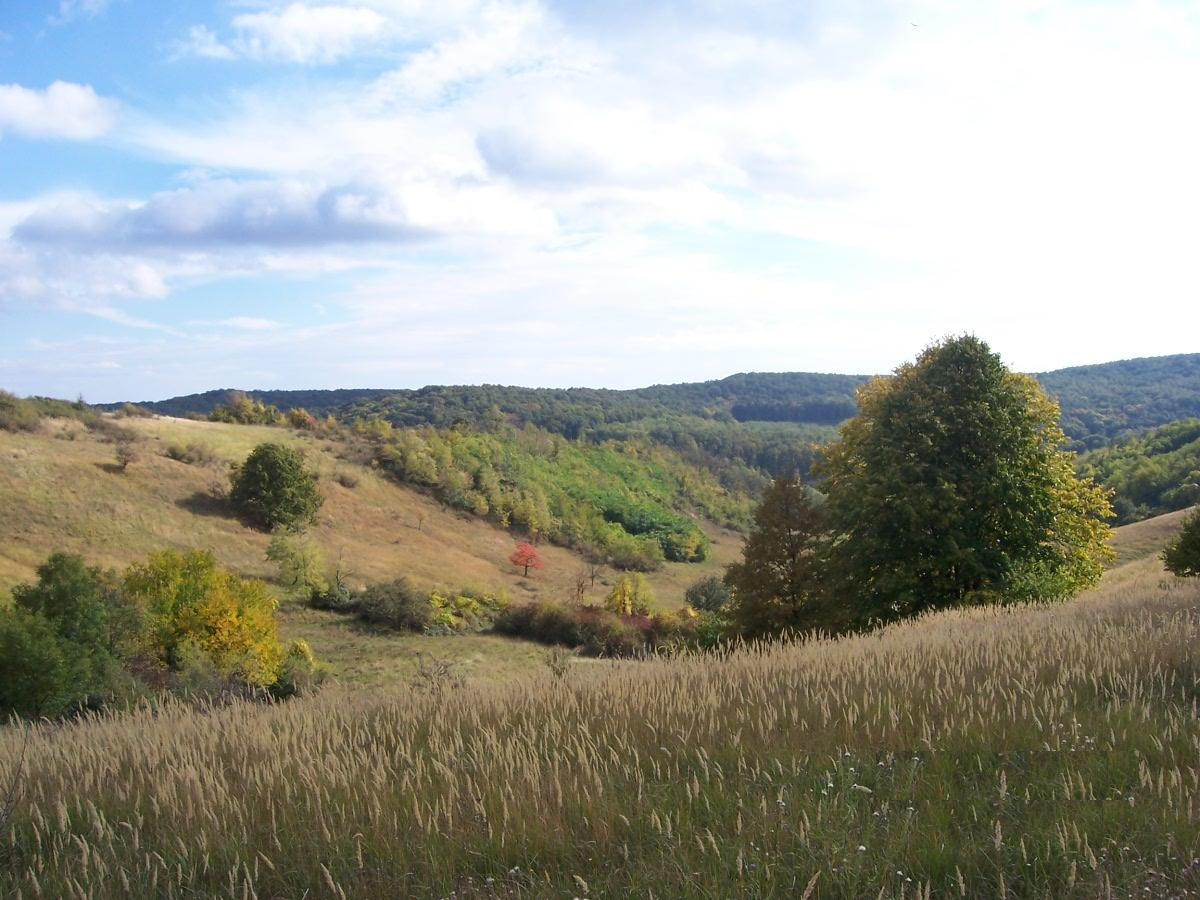
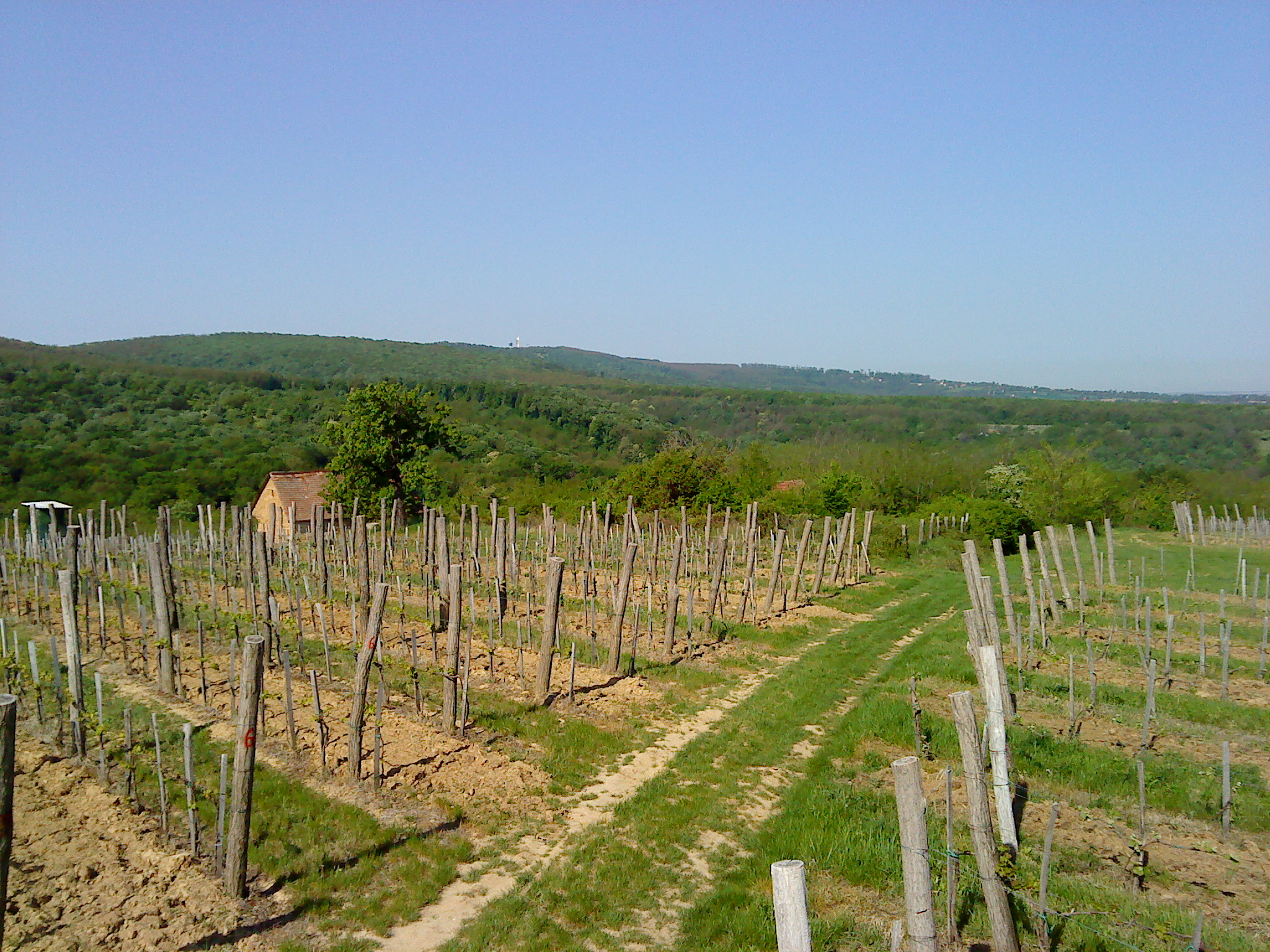
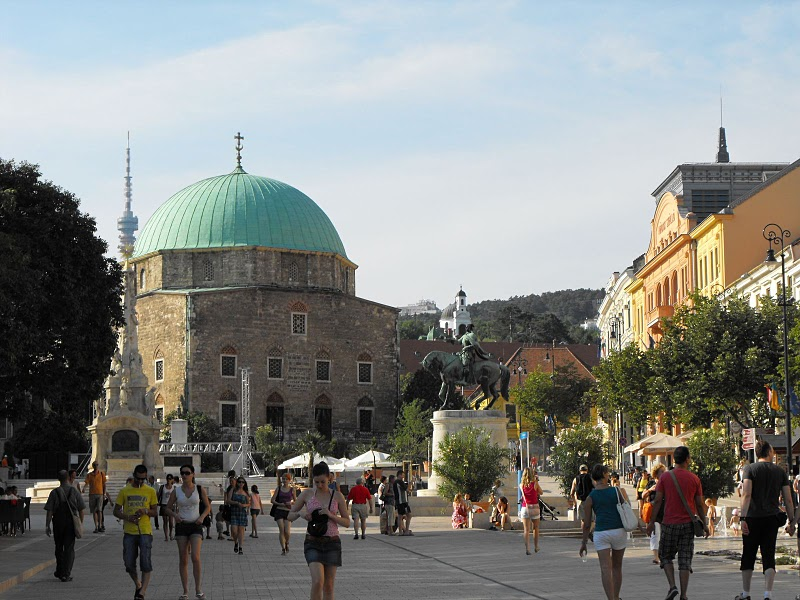
- Descending, from top: Hills near Mecseknádasd, Vineyards of Kistótfalu, and Downtown of Pécs

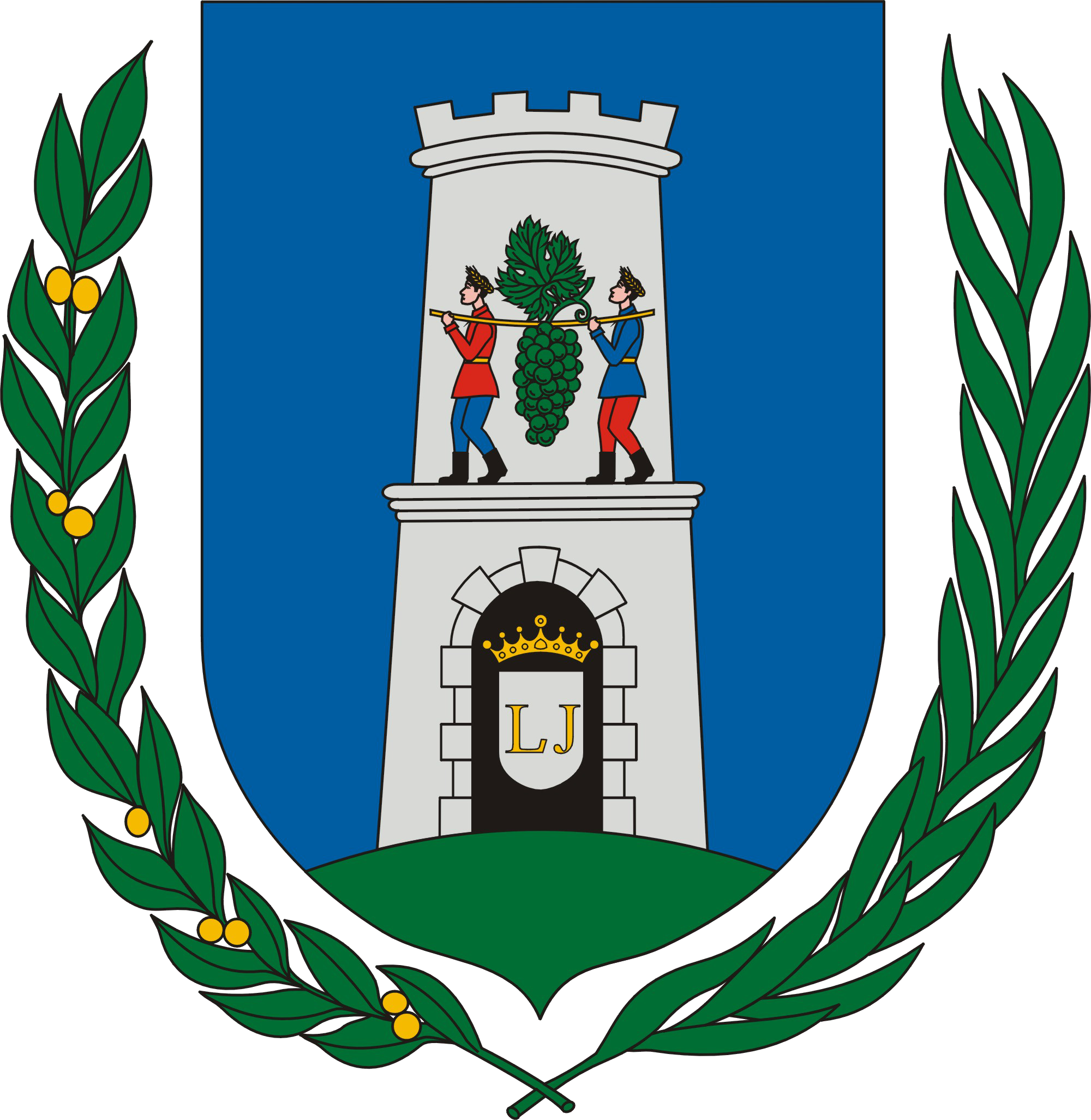
- Flag Coat of arms

- Baranya County within Hungary
- Interactive map of Baranya County
- Coordinates: 46°04′06″N 18°12′19″E
- Country: Hungary
- Region: Southern Transdanubia
- County seat: Pécs
- Districts: 10 districts: Bóly District; Hegyhát District; Komló District; Mohács District; Pécs District; Pécsvárad District; Sellye District; Siklós District; Szentlőrinc District; Szigetvár District

Government
  - Type: County Council
  - Body: Baranya County Council
  - President of the County Council: Csaba Nagy (Fidesz-KDNP)

Area
  - Total: 4,429.60 km^{2} (1,710.28 sq mi)
  - Rank: 10th in Hungary

Population (2025)
  - Total: 351,158
  - Rank: 10th in Hungary
  - Density: 79.2753/km^{2} (205.322/sq mi)

GDP
  - Total: HUF 858 billion €2.755 billion (2016)
- Postal code: 73xx, 75xx – 79xx
- Area code(s): (+36) 69, 72, 73
- ISO 3166 code: HU-BA
- Website: baranya.hu

Baranya (Hungarian: Baranya megye, pronounced [ˈbɒrɒɲɒ ˈmɛɟɛ]; German: Komitat Branau; Croatian: Baranjska županija) is a county (megye) in southern Hungary. It is part of the Southern Transdanubia statistical region and the historical Baranya region, which was a county (comitatus) in the Kingdom of Hungary dating back to the 11th century. Its current status as one of the 19 counties of Hungary was established in 1950 as part of wider Soviet administrative territorial reform following World War II. Its county seat and largest city is Pécs.

As of 2025, it has a population of 351,158. Of the 19 counties of Hungary (excluding Budapest), it is ranked 10th, both in terms of geographic area and population.

== Etymology ==
In German, it is known as Komitat Branau, and in Croatian as Baranjska županija (Baranja).

The county was probably named after its first comes 'Brana' or 'Braina'.

== Geography ==
This county has a total area of 4,429.60 km^{2} (1,710 sq mi) – 4.76% of Hungary – which is divided in Upper Baranya and Lower Baranya.

It is bordered by Somogy County to the northwest, Tolna County to the north, Bács-Kiskun County and the Danube to the east, and the border with Croatia (part of which is formed by the Drava River) to the south.

The northern part of the county is a mountain area with large forests, the Mecsek Mountains. The central areas are shared between the Baranya Hills and Villány Mountains. The very eastern and southern parts are flat.

The highest point in the county is Zengő in the Mecsek Mountains, at 682 metres. This is also the highest point of the mountain range.

Baranya is rich in mineral and thermal water, and also in other resources. 98% of Hungary's coal resources are found here.

=== Neighbours ===
- Tolna County in the North.
- Bács-Kiskun County in the East. (across the Danube river)
- Croatia in the south (across the Drava river) – Osijek-Baranja County and Virovitica-Podravina County
- Somogy County in the Northwest.

=== Climate ===
The climate of Baranya is a mix of continental and temperate, which makes it unique in Hungary, as the rest of the country is primarily continental. Its milder climate is due to its southern location and relative proximity to the Mediterranean Sea in comparison to other parts of the country, leaving it with warmer winters. It has the highest average annual rainfall of the Hungarian counties and a high amount of sunshine hours.

Pécs, Hungary

Climate chart (precipitation, max. and min. temperature)
J	F	M	A	M	J	J	A	S	O	N	D
39 2 −4	36 5 −1	37 11 1	54 17 7	63 22 11	85 25 14	65 27 16	60 27 15	54 23 12	39 17 7	60 10 3	50 3 −2
- █ Average max. and min. temperatures in °C
- █ Precipitation totals in mm
Imperial conversion
J	F	M	A	M	J	J	A	S	O	N	D
1.5 35 25	1.4 41 29	1.5 51 35	2.1 63 44	2.5 71 51	3.3 77 58	2.6 81 60	2.4 80 59	2.1 74 53	1.5 63 45	2.4 49 37	2 38 29
- █ Average max. and min. temperatures in °F
- █ Precipitation totals in inches

Köppen-Geiger climate classification map of Hungary (1km resolution) for data 1980-2016

== History ==
The area has been inhabited since ancient times. Before the Hungarian tribes conquered the area, it was inhabited by Slavs and Avars. Stephen I founded an episcopal seat here.

In 1526, the county was occupied by the Ottomans. It was taken by forces of the Holy League in 1689 during the Great Turkish War; it was formally ceded by the Ottomans to the now Habsburg-ruled Kingdom of Hungary in the 1699 Treaty of Karlowitz. Its medieval borders remained largely unchanged until 1919. According to the Treaty of Trianon, the southern part of the county (1,163 km^{2}, 449 sq mi) passed to the newly formed Kingdom of the Serbs, Croats and Slovenes (later renamed Yugoslavia; now in present-day Croatia). In 1941 during World War 2 this southern area was re-annexed to Hungary following the Axis invasion of Yugoslavia but returned to Yugoslavia after the war.

In the 1950 reorganization of the counties the area around the town of Szigetvár was transferred from Somogy County. Baranya has the largest number of minorities in Hungary (more than twice the country average), providing home to 34% of the German minority, the so-called Danube Swabians, and 32% of the Southern Slav minorities in Hungary.

The Stifolder or Stiffoller Shvove are a Roman Catholic subgroup of the so-called Danube Swabians. Their ancestors once came c. 1717–1804 from the Abbacy and later Prince-Bishopric of Fulda and surroundings (Roman Catholic Diocese of Fulda), and settled in Baranya. They retained their own German dialect and culture until the end of WW2. After WW2, the majority of Danube Swabians were expelled to allied-occupied Germany and allied-occupied Austria, in accordance with the 1945 Potsdam Agreement.

Only a few people can speak the old Stiffolerisch Schvovish dialect. Also a sausage (kolbász) is named after these people.

Electoral History

2018 General Elections
Party	Votes	%	Seats	Change
Fidesz-KDNP (joint)	45,950	35.62%	3	-1
Independent	21,998	17.05%	1	+1
Jobbik	19,772	15.33%	0	-
Democratic Coalition	15,422	11.95%	0	-
MSZP-Párbeszéd (joint)	13,605	10.55%	0	-
Politics Can Be Different	6,566	5.1%	0	-
Momentum	2,433	1.89%	0	-
Total	129,014	100	4	-

== Demographics ==
Historical population
Year	Pop.	±%
1870	265,069	—
1880	273,615	+3.2%
1890	299,901	+9.6%
1900	313,174	+4.4%
1910	328,902	+5.0%
1920	313,469	−4.7%
1930	337,698	+7.7%
1941	353,426	+4.7%
1949	356,533	+0.9%
1960	395,342	+10.9%
1970	421,765	+6.7%
1980	432,617	+2.6%
1990	417,400	−3.5%
2001	407,448	−2.4%
2011	386,441	−5.2%
2022	354,022	−8.4%
Source: KSH

As of 2025, the county has a population of 351,158 with a population density of 79/km^{2}.

Religion in Baranya County (2022 census – of those who declared their religion (59.7%))
1. Roman Catholic (57.5%)
2. Calvinistic (8.90%)
3. Lutheran (1.60%)
4. Faith Church (0.50%)
5. Greek Catholic (0.50%)
6. Other Christian denominations (3.70%)
7. Other religion (0.60%)
8. Not religious (26.7%)

=== 2011 census ===
As of the census of 2011, there were 386,441 residents, 160,040 households, and 105,646 families living in the county. The population density was 87 inhabitants per square kilometres(227/sqmi). There were 167,453 housing units at an average density of 38per square kilometre (98/sqmi).

There were 160,040 households, of which 63.2% were one-family households, 1.4% were multi-family households, 32.1% were one-person households, and 3.4% were other non-family households. Elderly individuals living alone were 15.9% of all households. The average household size was 2.34.

There were 105,646 families, of which 44.1% were married couples or consensual unions living together with children, 36.4% were couples without children, 16.7% were single females with children, and 2.8% were single males with children. The average family size was 2.82.

The age breakdown of the county was 20.1% under the age of 20, 7.0% between ages 20 and 24, 27.4% aged 25 to 44, 28.3% aged 45 to 64, and 17.2% aged 65 or older. The gender makeup of the county was 47.2% male and 52.8% female.

Religious adherence in the county was 46.8% Roman Catholic, 6.4% Reformed (Calvinist), 1.2% Evangelical (Lutheran), 0.3% Greek Catholic, 0.1% Orthodox, and 1.5% other religions. The non-religious were 16.2% and atheists were 1.5%, with 26.0% declining to answer.

=== 2001 census ===
As of the census of 2001, there were 407,448 residents, 151,956 households, and 115,946 families living in the county. The population density was 238 inhabitants per square mile (92/km^{2}). There were 156,632 housing units at an average density of 92 per square mile (35/km^{2}).

There were 151,956 households, of which 68.5% were one-family households, 3.8% were multi-family households, 24.9% were one-person households, and 2.7% were other non-family households. Elderly individuals living alone were 13.1% of all households. The average household size was 2.60.

There were 115,946 families, of which 48.7% were married couples or consensual unions living together with children, 35.4% were couples without children, 13.7% were single females with children, and 2.1% were single males with children. The average family size was 2.87.

The age breakdown of the county was 23.0% under the age of 20, 8.1% between ages 20 and 24, 28.0% aged 25 to 44, 26.0% aged 45 to 64, and 14.9% aged 65 or older. The gender makeup of the county was 47.5% male and 52.5% female.

Religious adherence in the county was 64.2% Roman Catholic, 8.7% Reformed (Calvinist), 1.5% Evangelical (Lutheran), 0.5% Greek Catholic, 0.1% Orthodox, and 0.8% other religions. The non-religious were 13.4%, with 10.8% declining to answer.

=== Ethnicity ===
Besides the Hungarian majority, the main minorities are the Germans (approx. 22,000), Roma (17,000), Croats (6,000), and Serbs (500).

Total population (2011 census): 386,441
Ethnic groups (2011 census): Identified themselves: 364,801 persons:

- Hungarians: 315,713 (86.54%)
- Germans: 22,150 (6.07%)
- Romani: 16,995 (4.66%)
- Croats: 6,343 (1.74%)
- Others and indefinable: 3,600 (0.99%)

Approx. 58,000 persons in Baranya County did not declare their ethnic group at the 2011 census.

== Regional structure ==
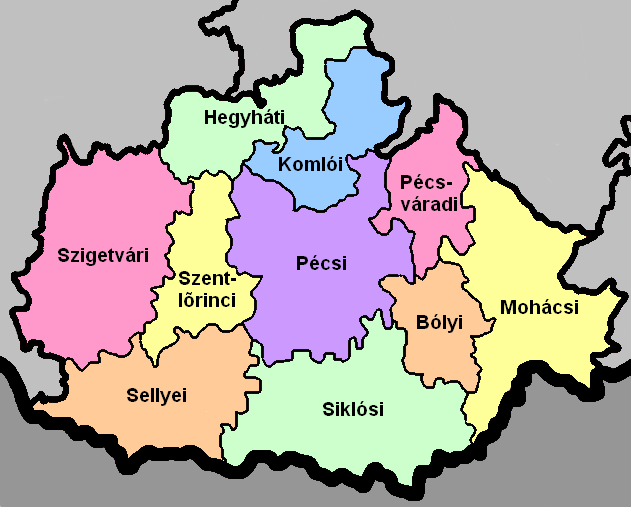
Districts of Baranya County

No.	English and Hungarian names	Area (km^{2})	Population (2011)	Density (pop./km^{2})	Seat	No. of municipalities
1	Bóly District; Bólyi járás	220.03	11,956	54	Bóly	16
2	Hegyhát District; Hegyháti járás	360.72	12,744	35	Sásd	25
3	Komló District; Komlói járás	292.48	35,489	121	Komló	20
4	Mohács District; Mohácsi járás	600.98	35,164	59	Mohács	26
5	Pécs District; Pécsi járás	623.07	189,036	303	Pécs	40
6	Pécsvárad District; Pécsváradi járás	246.44	11,931	48	Pécsvárad	17
7	Sellye District; Sellyei járás	493.69	14,192	29	Sellye	38
8	Siklós District; Siklósi járás	652.99	35,929	55	Siklós	53
9	Szentlőrinc District; Szentlőrinci járás	282.43	14,998	53	Szentlőrinc	21
10	Szigetvár District; Szigetvári járás	656.76	25,002	38	Szigetvár	45
Baranya County		4,429.59	386,446	87	Pécs	301

== Politics ==
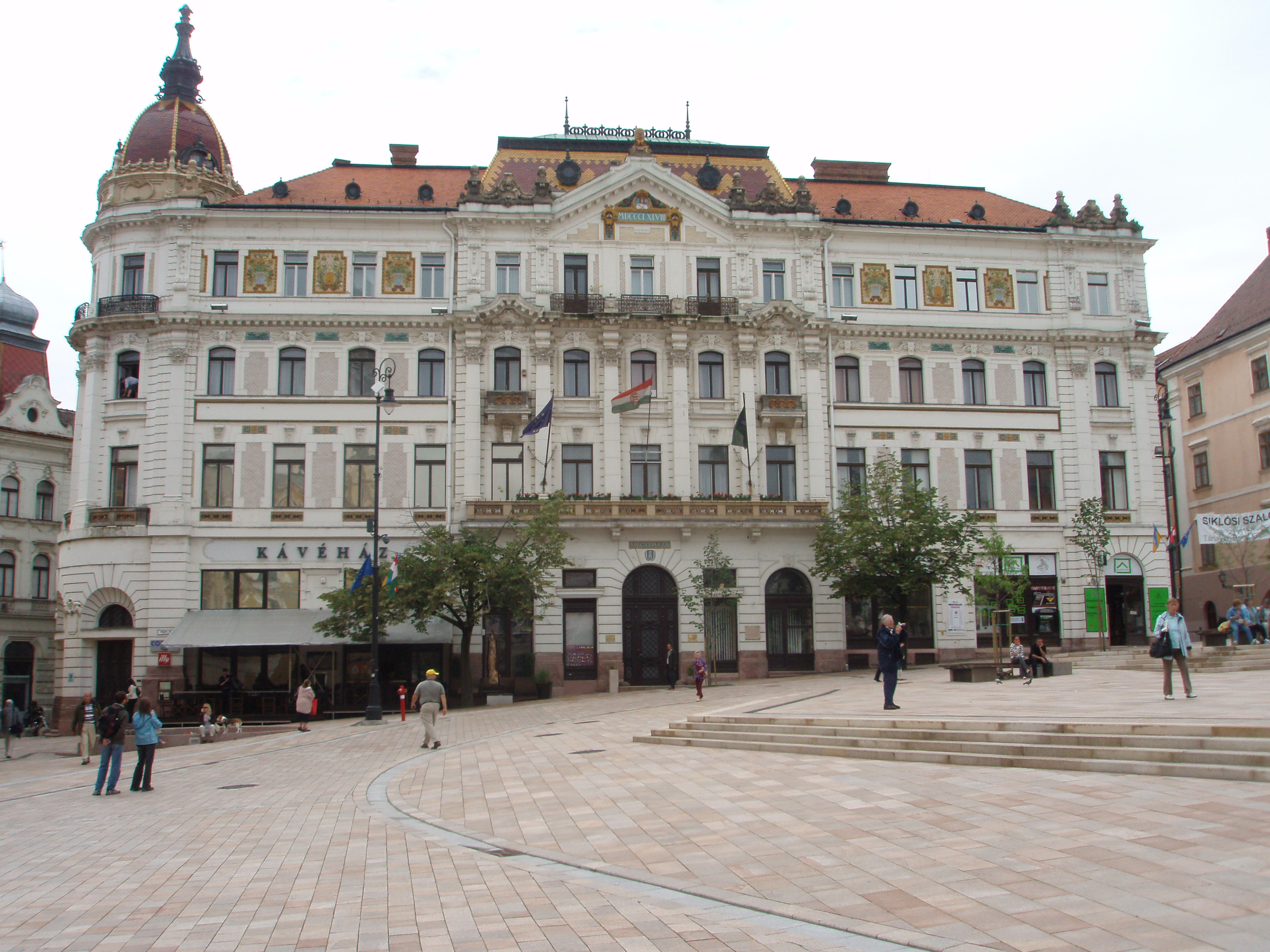
Baranya County Hall

=== County Assembly ===
The Baranya County Council, elected at the 2019 local government elections, is made up of 18 counselors, with the following party composition:

Party	Seats	Current County Assembly
Fidesz-KDNP	12	
Democratic Coalition (DK)	2	
Movement for a Better Hungary (Jobbik)	2	
Momentum	1	
Hungarian Socialist Party (MSZP)	1	

==== President of the Assembly ====
President	Terminus
dr. Őri László (Fidesz-KDNP)	2019–

=== Members of the National Assembly ===
The following members elected of the National Assembly during the 2022 parliamentary election:

Constituency	Member	Party
Baranya County 1st constituency	Tamás Mellár	Dialogue (Note: Mellár is a member of Dialogue. He ran as a joint candidate of the United for Hungary electoral alliance during the 2022 parliamentary election.)
Baranya County 2nd constituency	Péter Hoppál	Fidesz–KDNP
Baranya County 3rd constituency	János Hargitai	Fidesz–KDNP
Baranya County 4th constituency	Csaba Nagy	Fidesz–KDNP

== Municipalities ==
Baranya County has 1 urban county, 13 towns, 3 large villages and 284 villages.

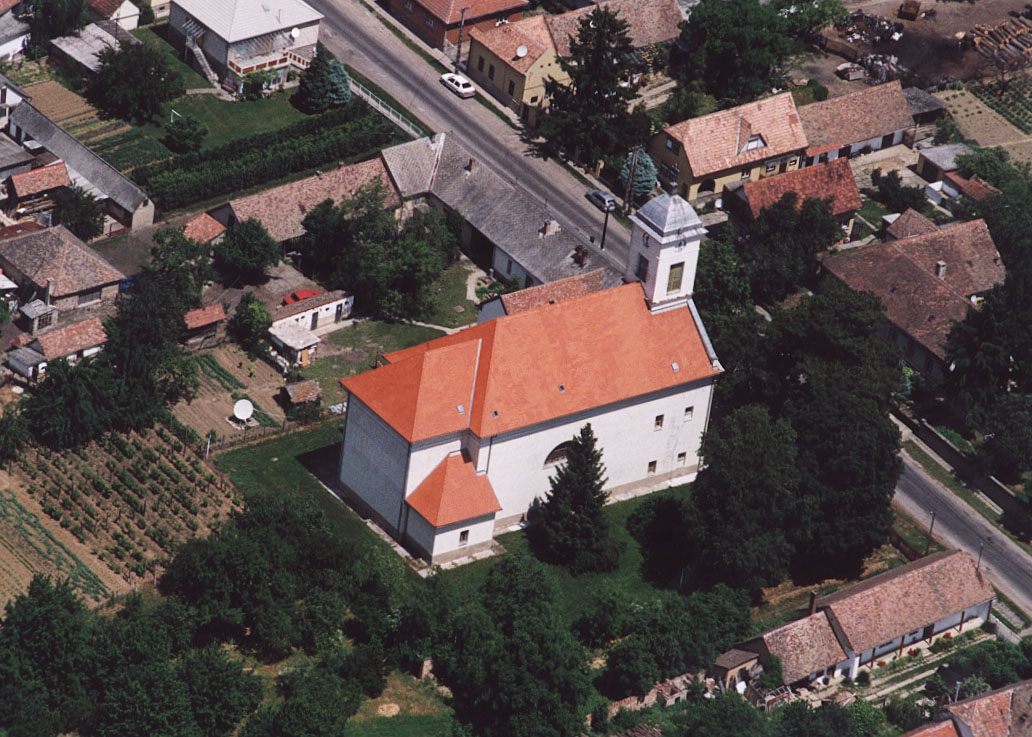
Hosszúhetény - Temple from above

Like Borsod-Abaúj-Zemplén, Baranya is a county of extremes when it comes to regional structure. The county seat is one of the five largest cities (and three largest agglomerations) of Hungary, but more than 2/3 of the municipalities are small hamlets with a population under 500. Half of the county's population lives in the county seat or in its immediate vicinity, while 22% of the population lives in villages that have less than 1000 inhabitants.

Cities with county rights

(ordered by population, as of 2011 census)

- Pécs (156,049) – county seat

Towns

- Komló (24,394)
- Mohács (17,808)
- Szigetvár (10,614)
- Siklós (9,574)
- Szentlőrinc (6,662)
- Kozármisleny (5,998)
- Pécsvárad (4,047)
- Harkány (4,010)
- Bóly (3,957)
- Sásd (3,237)
- Sellye (2,783)
- Villány (2,509)
- Mágocs (2,388)

Villages

- Abaliget
- Adorjás
- Almamellék
- Almáskeresztúr
- Alsómocsolád
- Alsószentmárton
- Apátvarasd
- Aranyosgadány
- Ág
- Áta
- Babarc
- Babarcszőlős
- Bakóca
- Bakonya
- Baksa
- Baranyahídvég
- Baranyajenő
- Baranyaszentgyörgy
- Basal
- Bánfa
- Bár
- Belvárdgyula
- Beremend
- Berkesd
- Besence
- Bezedek
- Bicsérd
- Bikal
- Birján
- Bisse
- Boda
- Bodolyabér
- Bogdása
- Bogád
- Bogádmindszent
- Boldogasszonyfa
- Borjád
- Bosta
- Botykapeterd
- Bükkösd
- Bürüs
- Csányoszró
- Csarnóta
- Csebény
- Cserdi
- Cserkút
- Csertő
- Csonkamindszent
- Cún
- Drávacsehi
- Drávacsepely
- Drávafok
- Drávaiványi
- Drávakeresztúr
- Drávapalkonya
- Drávapiski
- Drávaszabolcs
- Drávaszerdahely
- Drávasztára
- Dencsháza
- Dinnyeberki
- Diósviszló
- Dunaszekcső
- Egerág
- Egyházasharaszti
- Egyházaskozár
- Ellend
- Endrőc
- Erdősmecske
- Erdősmárok
- Erzsébet
- Fazekasboda
- Feked
- Felsőegerszeg
- Felsőszentmárton
- Garé
- Gerde
- Geresdlak
- Gerényes
- Gilvánfa
- Gordisa
- Gyód
- Gödre
- Görcsöny
- Görcsönydoboka
- Gyöngyfa
- Gyöngyösmellék
- Hásságy
- Hegyhátmaróc
- Hegyszentmárton
- Helesfa
- Hetvehely
- Hidas
- Himesháza
- Hirics
- Hobol
- Homorúd
- Horváthertelend
- Hosszúhetény
- Husztót
- Ibafa
- Illocska
- Ipacsfa
- Ivánbattyán
- Ivándárda
- Kacsóta
- Kákics
- Kárász
- Kásád
- Kátoly
- Katádfa
- Kékesd
- Kemse
- Keresztespuszta
- Keszü
- Kémes
- Képespuszta
- Kétújfalu
- Királyegyháza
- Kisasszonyfa
- Kisbeszterce
- Kisbudmér
- Kisdobsza
- Kisdér
- Kishajmás
- Kisharsány
- Kisherend
- Kisjakabfalva
- Kiskassa
- Kislippó
- Kisnyárád
- Kisszentmárton
- Kistamási
- Kistapolca
- Kistótfalu
- Kisvaszar
- Kisújbánya
- Kovácshida
- Kovácsszénája
- Kórós
- Köblény
- Kökény
- Kölked
- Kővágószőlős
- Kővágótöttös
- Lapáncsa
- Lánycsók
- Liget
- Lippó
- Liptód
- Lothárd
- Lovászhetény
- Lúzsok
- Magyarbóly
- Magyaregregy
- Magyarhertelend
- Magyarlukafa
- Magyarmecske
- Magyarsarlós
- Magyarszék
- Magyartelek
- Majs
- Markóc
- Márok
- Martonfa
- Maráza
- Marócsa
- Matty
- Mánfa
- Márfa
- Máriakéménd
- Máza
- Mecseknádasd
- Mecsekpölöske
- Mekényes
- Merenye
- Meződ
- Mindszentgodisa
- Molvány
- Monyoród
- Mozsgó
- Nagybudmér
- Nagycsány
- Nagydobsza
- Nagyhajmás
- Nagyharsány
- Nagykozár
- Nagynyárád
- Nagypall
- Nagypeterd
- Nagytótfalu
- Nagyváty
- Nemeske
- Nyugotszenterzsébet
- Okorvölgy
- Okorág
- Olasz
- Old
- Orfű
- Oroszló
- Óbánya
- Ócsárd
- Ófalu
- Ózdfalu
- Palkonya
- Palotabozsok
- Palé
- Páprád
- Patapoklosi
- Pécsbagota
- Pécsdevecser
- Pécsudvard
- Pellérd
- Pereked
- Peterd
- Pettend
- Piskó
- Pogány
- Pócsa
- Rádfalva
- Regenye
- Romonya
- Rózsafa
- Sámod
- Sárok
- Sátorhely
- Siklósbodony
- Siklósnagyfalu
- Somberek
- Somogyapáti
- Somogyhatvan
- Somogyhárságy
- Somogyviszló
- Sósvertike
- Sumony
- Szabadszentkirály
- Szajk
- Szalatnak
- Szalánta
- Szaporca
- Szava
- Szágy
- Szárász
- Szászvár
- Szebény
- Szederkény
- Székelyszabar
- Szellő
- Szemely
- Szentdénes
- Szentegát
- Szentkatalin
- Szentlászló
- Szilvás
- Szilágy
- Szörény
- Szőke
- Szőkéd
- Szulimán
- Szűr
- Tarrós
- Teklafalu
- Tengeri
- Tékes
- Tésenfa
- Téseny
- Tormás
- Tófű
- Tótszentgyörgy
- Töttös
- Túrony
- Udvar
- Újpetre
- Vajszló
- Varga
- Várad
- Vásárosbéc
- Vásárosdombó
- Vázsnok
- Vejti
- Vékény
- Velény
- Véménd
- Versend
- Villánykövesd
- Vokány
- Zaláta
- Zádor
- Zengővárkony
- Zók

municipalities are large villages.

== Gallery ==
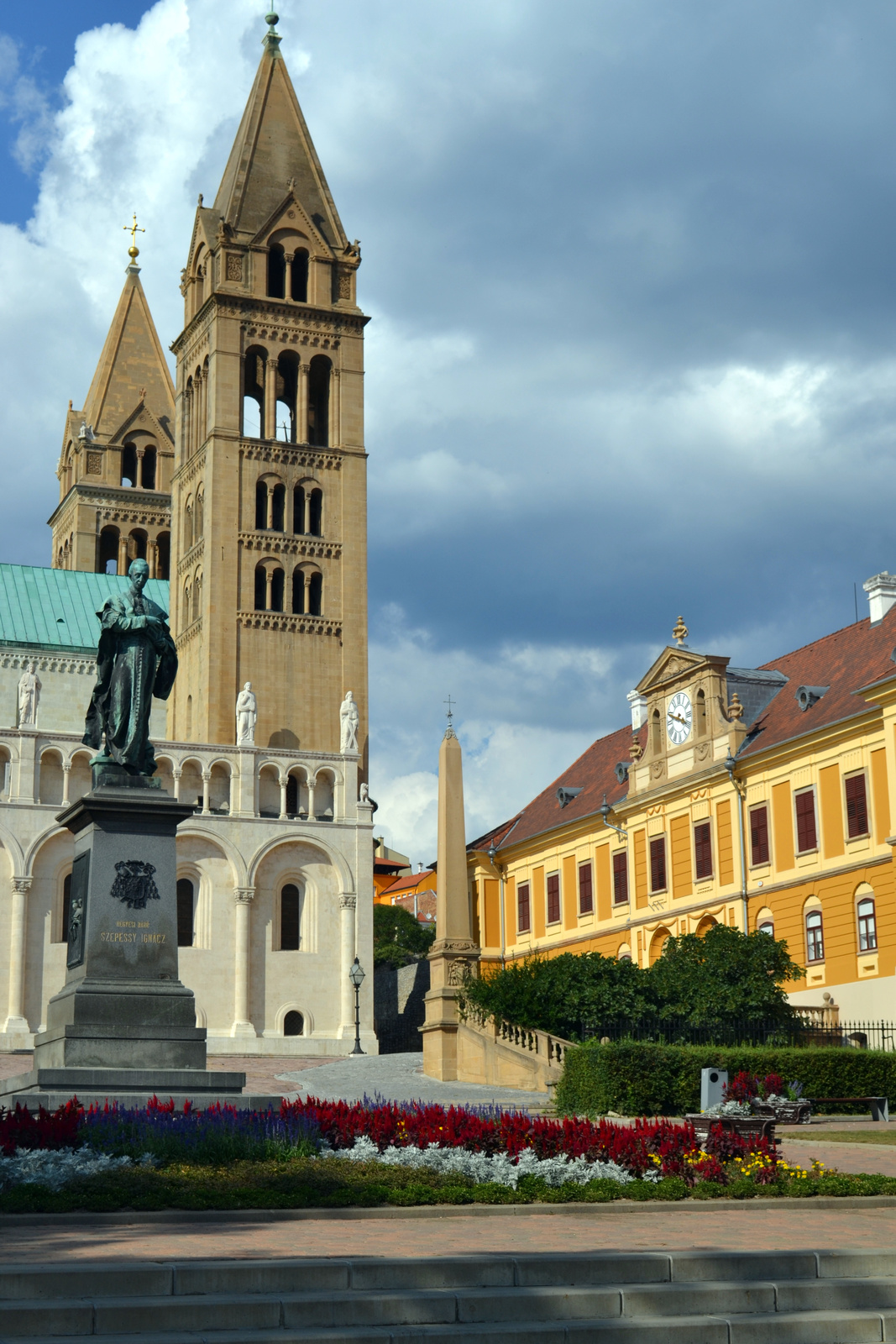
Pécs, the county seat

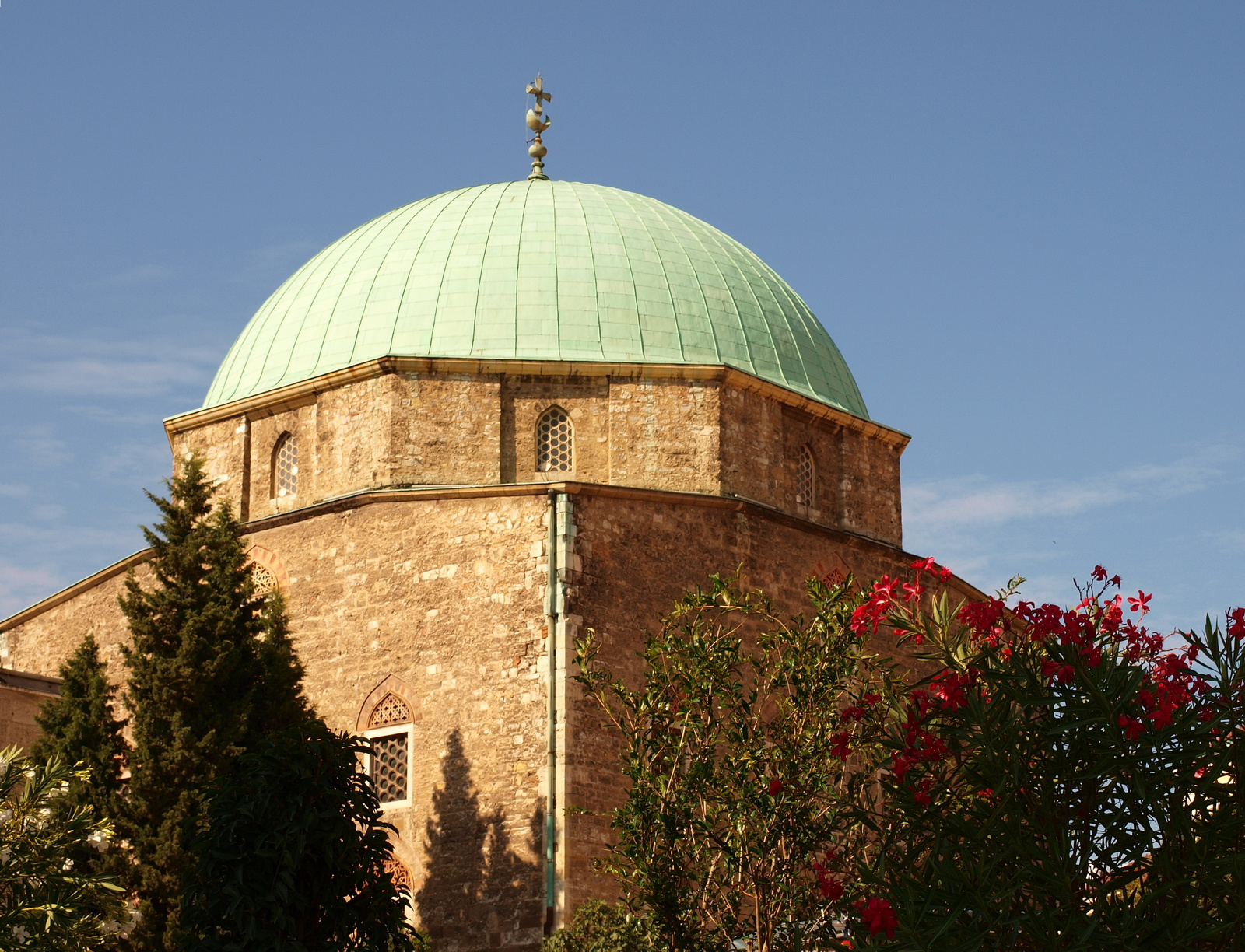
Mosque of Pasha Qasim, Pécs

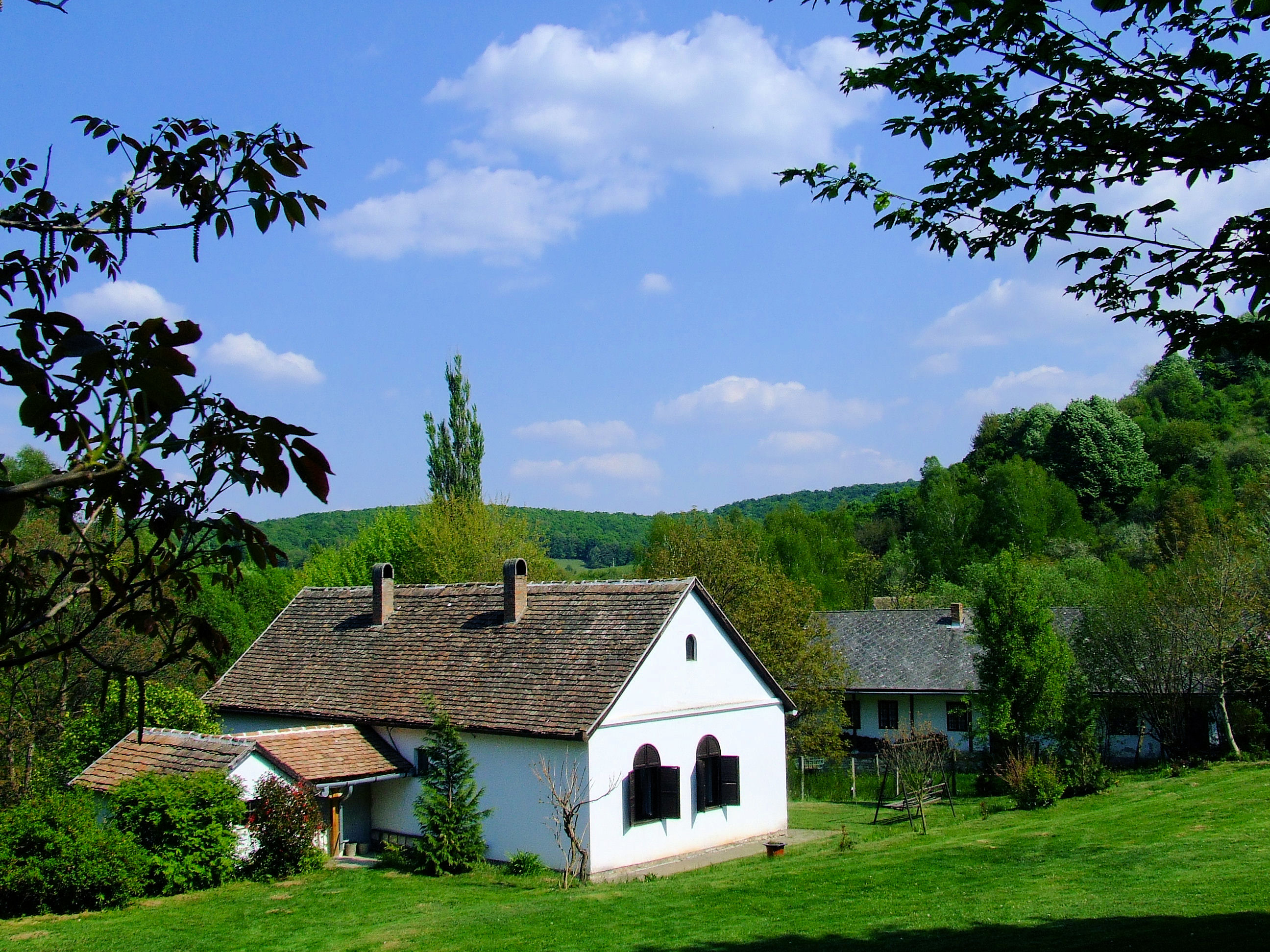
Traditional house in Kisújbánya

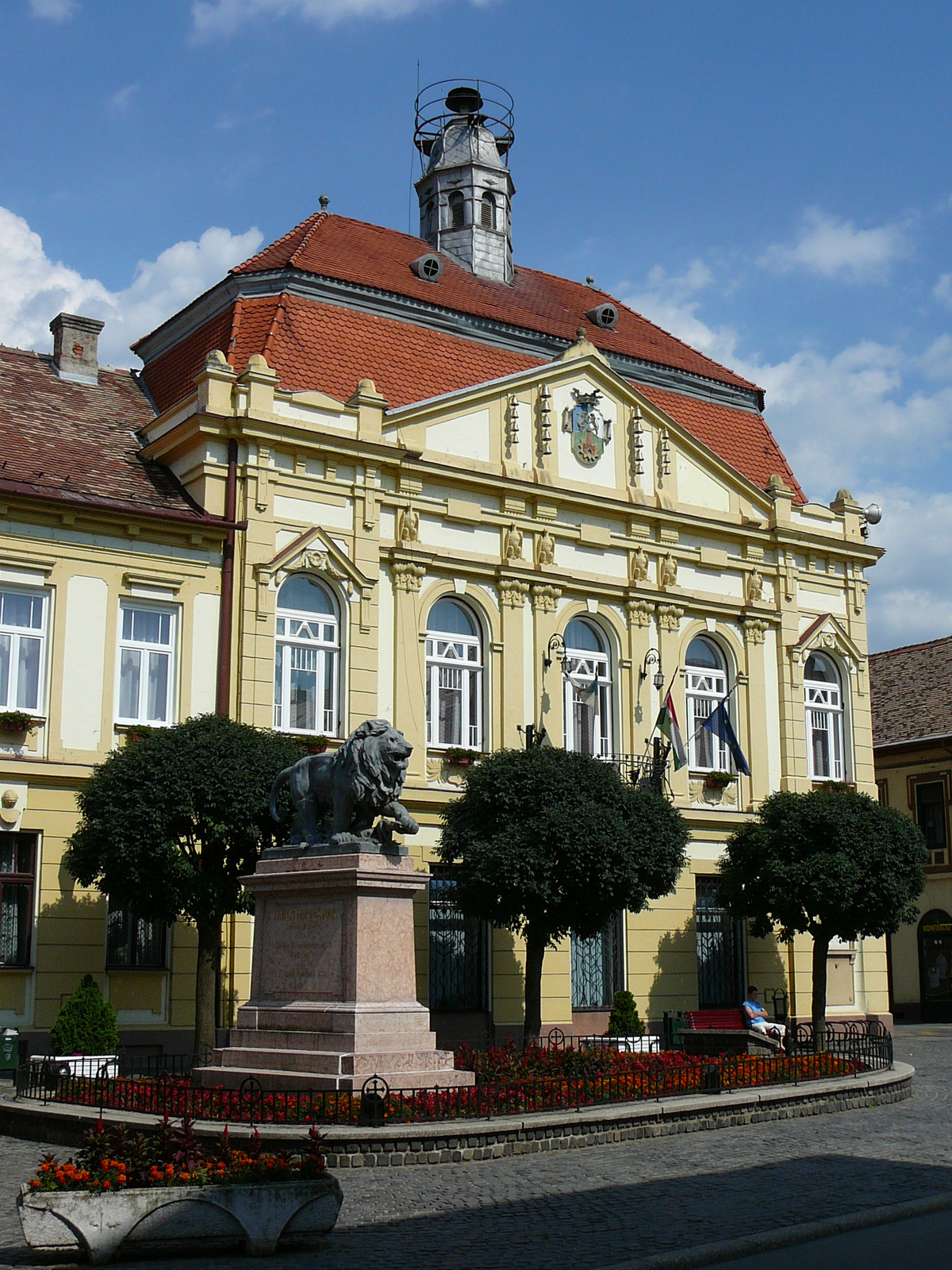
Town hall of Szigetvár

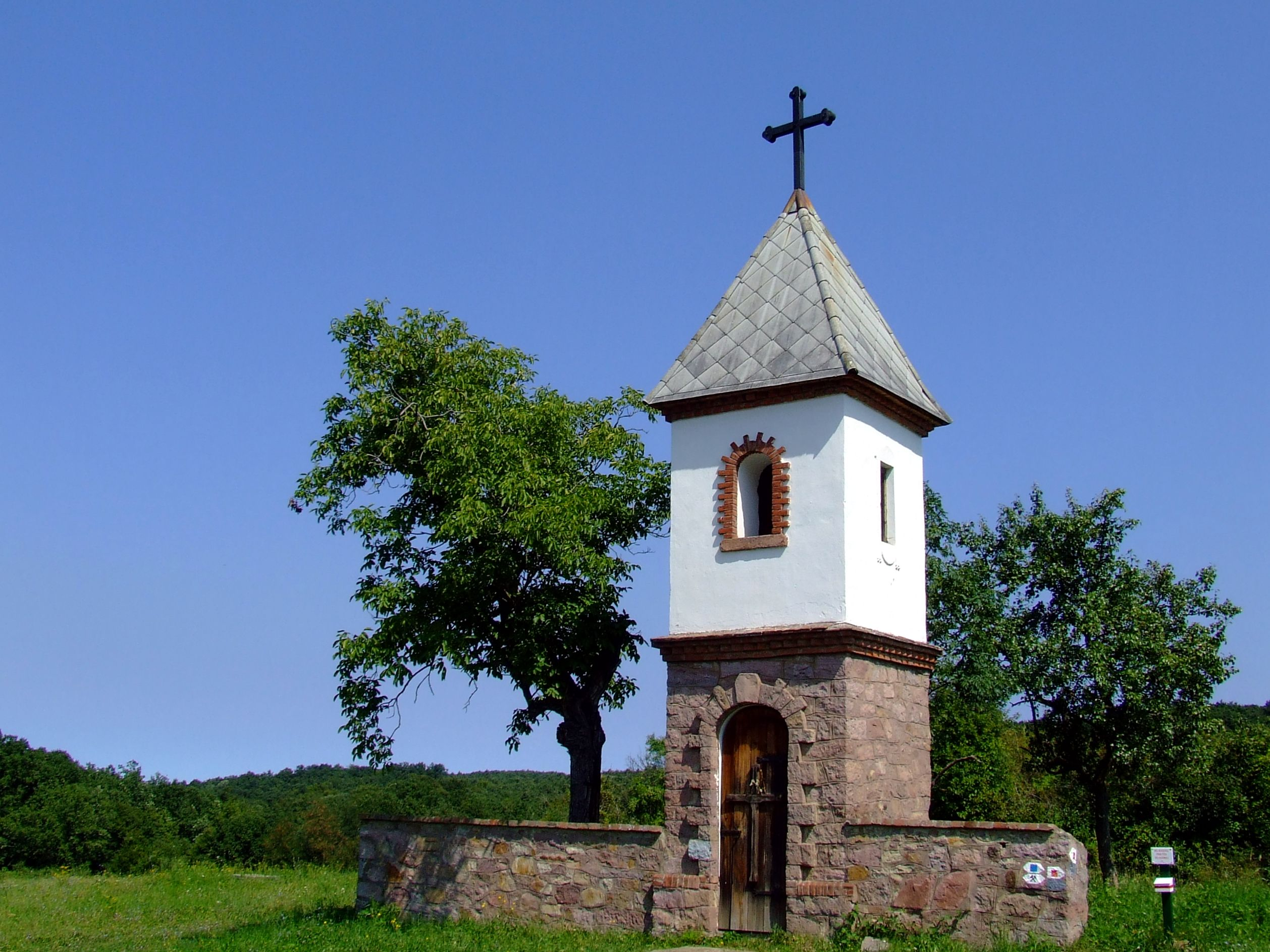
Bell tower on the Mecsek Mountains

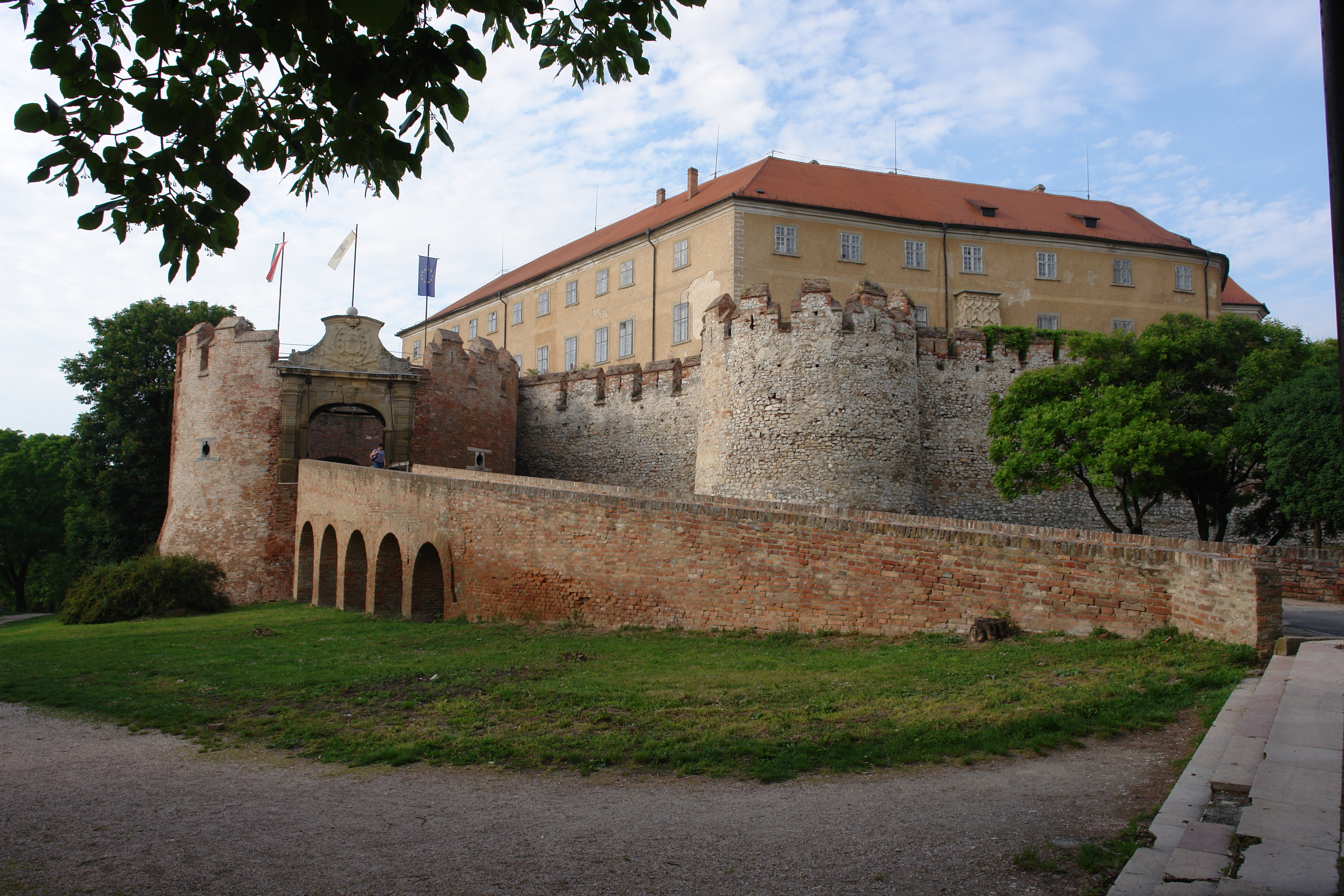
Siklós Castle

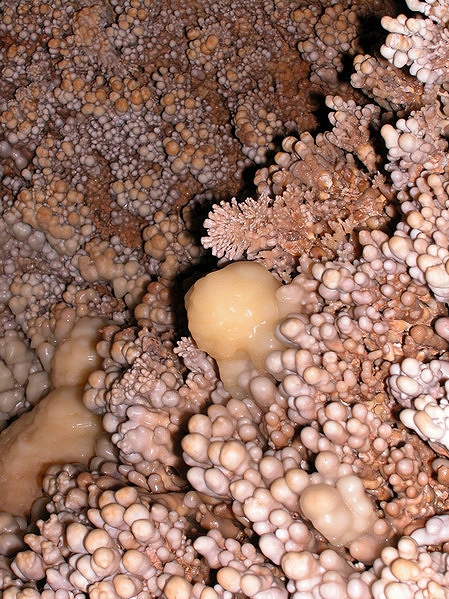
Crystal caves in Nagyharsány

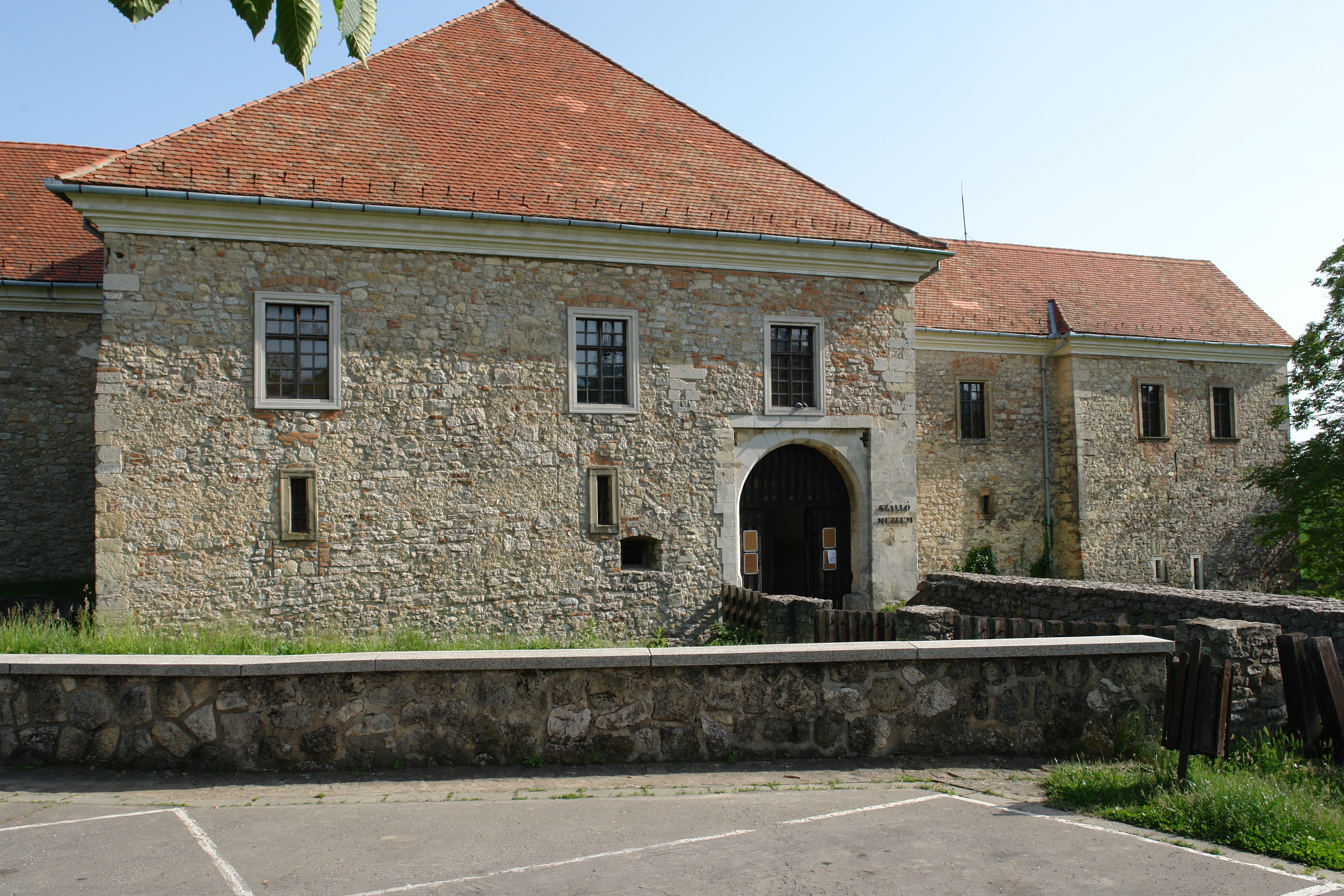
Pécsvárad Abbey
