= Nemeske =

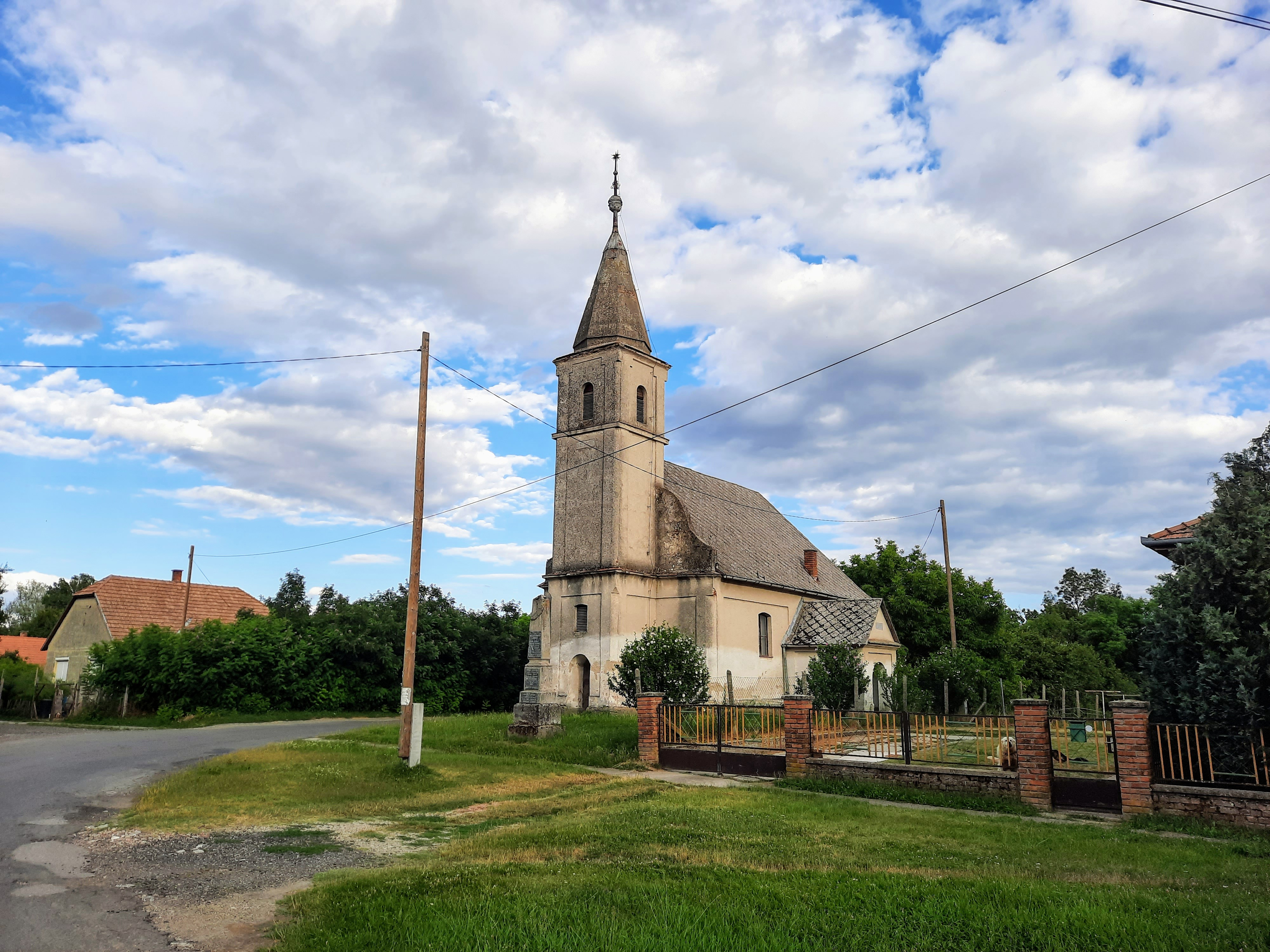

- Location of Baranya county in Hungary

- Location of Nemeske
- Coordinates: 46.02071°N 17.71432°E
- Country: Hungary
- County: Baranya

Area
  - Total: 10.57 km^{2} (4.08 sq mi)

Population (2004)
  - Total: 293
  - Density: 27.71/km^{2} (71.8/sq mi)
- Time zone: UTC+1 (CET)
  - Summer (DST): UTC+2 (CEST)
- Postal code: 7981
- Area code: 73

Nemeske (Croatian: Nemeška) is a village in Baranya county, Hungary.
