= Sumony =

- Village (Falva)
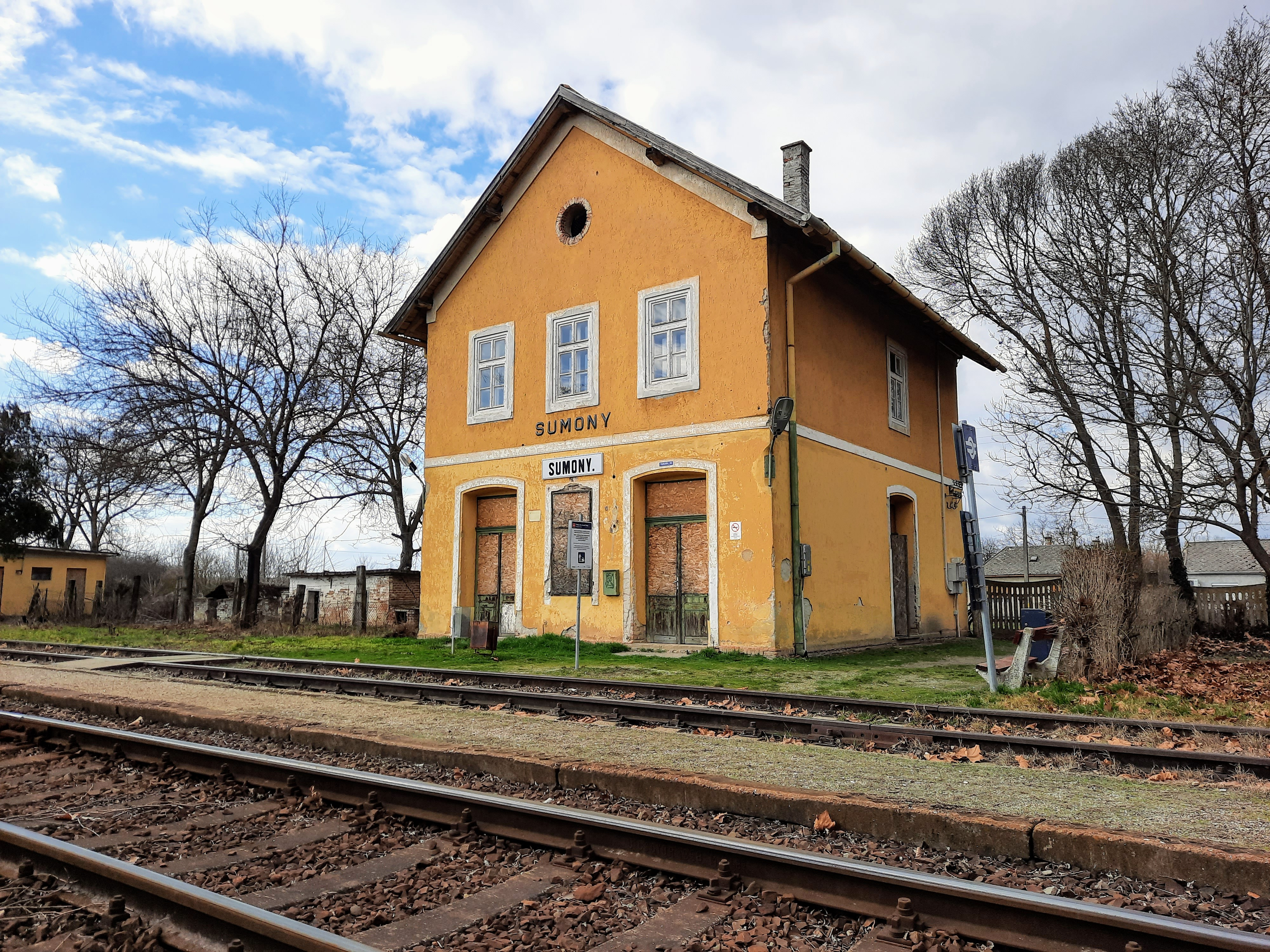

- Location of Baranya county in Hungary

- Location of Sumony
- Coordinates: 45.96921°N 17.91593°E
- Country: Hungary
- County: Baranya

Area
  - Total: 20.21 km^{2} (7.80 sq mi)

Population (2004)
  - Total: 502
  - Density: 24.83/km^{2} (64.3/sq mi)
- Time zone: UTC+1 (CET)
  - Summer (DST): UTC+2 (CEST)
- Postal code: 7960
- Area code: 73

Sumony is a village in Baranya county, Hungary.
