= Szilvás =

- Village (Falva)
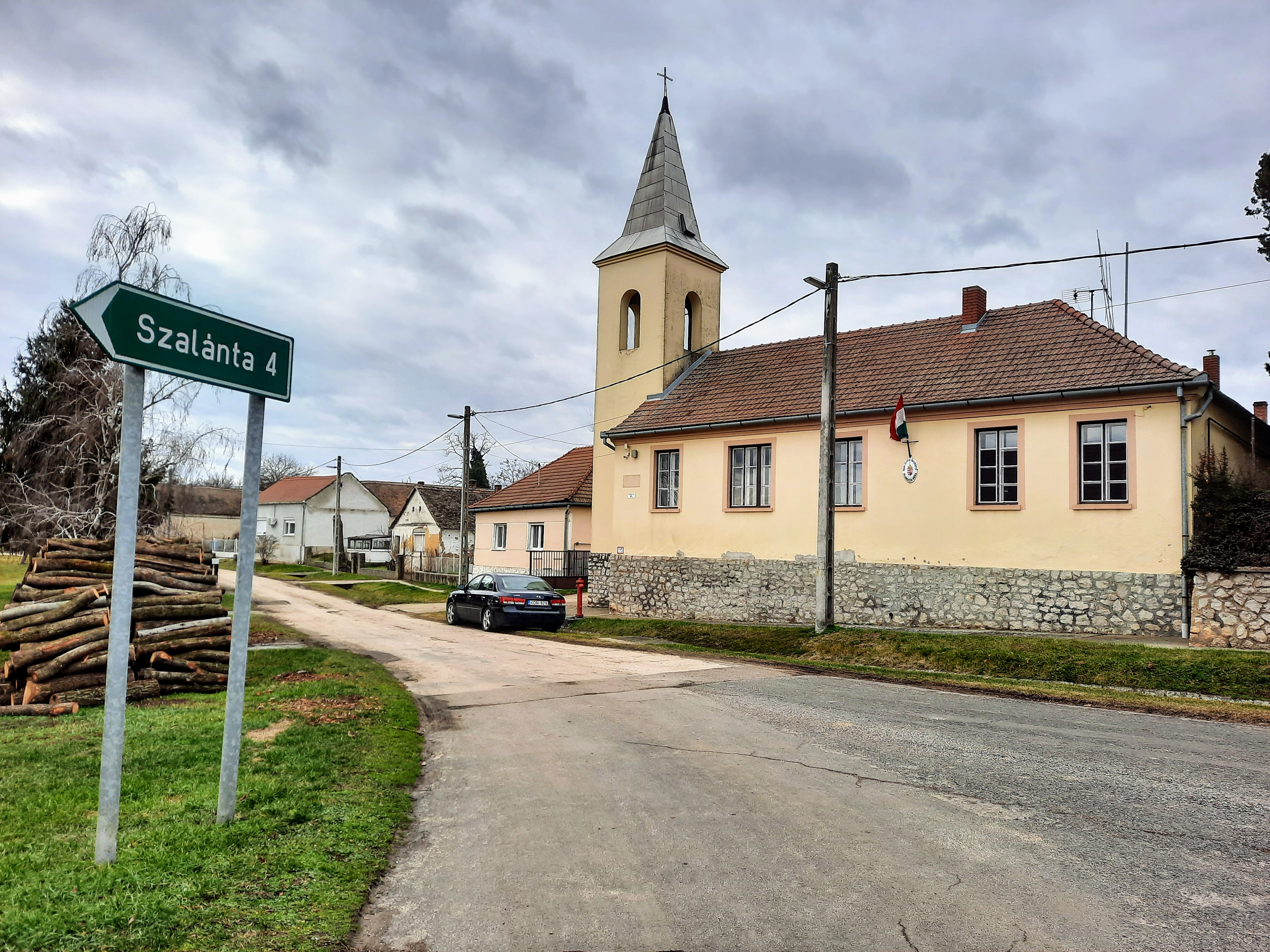
- Interactive map of Szilvás
- Coordinates: 45°57′42″N 18°11′59″E
- Country: Hungary
- County: Baranya

Population (2025)
  - Total: 130
- Time zone: UTC+1 (CET)
  - Summer (DST): UTC+2 (CEST)

Szilvás is a village in Baranya county, Hungary.
