= Almáskeresztúr =

- Village
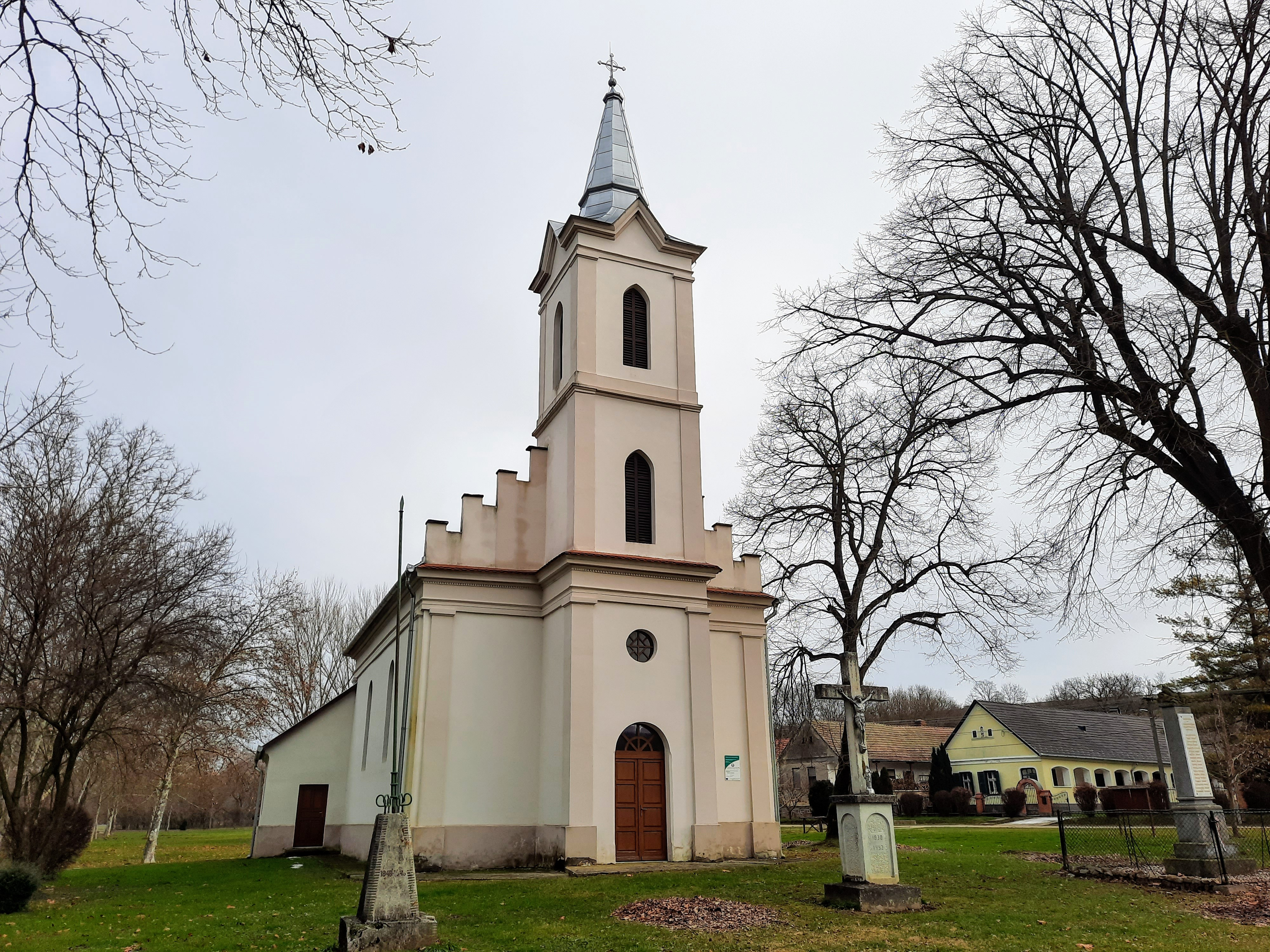
- Roman Catholic church in Almáskeresztúr

- Coat of arms

- Location of Almáskeresztúr
- Coordinates: 46°07′N 17°54′E
- Country: Hungary
- County: Baranya

Area
  - Total: 5.03 sq mi (13.03 km^{2})

Population (2015)
  - Total: 81
  - Density: 16/sq mi (6.2/km^{2})
- Time zone: UTC+1 (CET)
  - Summer (DST): UTC+2 (CEST)

Almáskeresztúr is a village in Baranya county, Hungary.
