= Kémes =

- Village
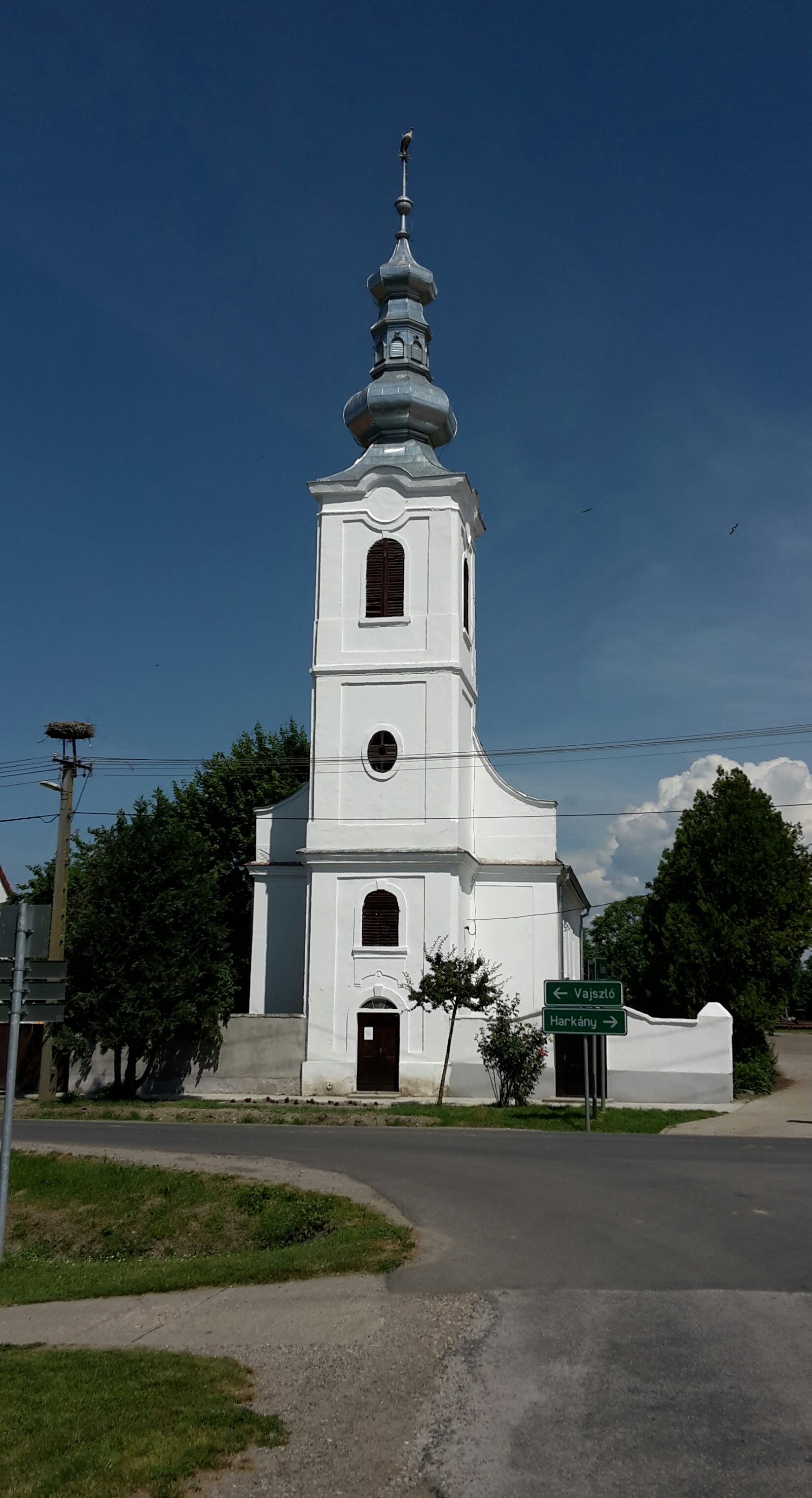
- Kemesi reformatus templom.
- Interactive map of Kémes
- Coordinates: 45°49′N 18°06′E
- Country: Hungary
- County: Baranya
- Time zone: UTC+1 (CET)
  - Summer (DST): UTC+2 (CEST)

Kémes is a village in Baranya county, Hungary. It has an area of 6.89 km² and its population in 2019 was estimated at 438 inhabitants.
