= Hirics =

Village in Baranya, Hungary

- Location of Baranya county in Hungary

- Location of Hirics
- Coordinates: 45.82548°N 17.99196°E
- Country: Hungary
- County: Baranya

Area
  - Total: 14.68 km^{2} (5.67 sq mi)

Population (2015)
  - Total: 237
  - Density: 16.1/km^{2} (41.8/sq mi)
- Time zone: UTC+1 (CET)
  - Summer (DST): UTC+2 (CEST)
- Postal code: 7838
- Area code: 73

Hirics is a village in Baranya county, Hungary.
