= Bánfa =

- Village
- Coat of arms
- Interactive map of Bánfa
- Coordinates: 45°59′N 17°53′E
- Country: Hungary
- County: Baranya

Area
  - Total: 4.66 sq mi (12.06 km^{2})

Population (2015)
  - Total: 168
  - Density: 36.1/sq mi (13.9/km^{2})
- Time zone: UTC+1 (CET)
  - Summer (DST): UTC+2 (CEST)

Bánfa is a village in Baranya county, Hungary.
