= Nagycsány =

- Village
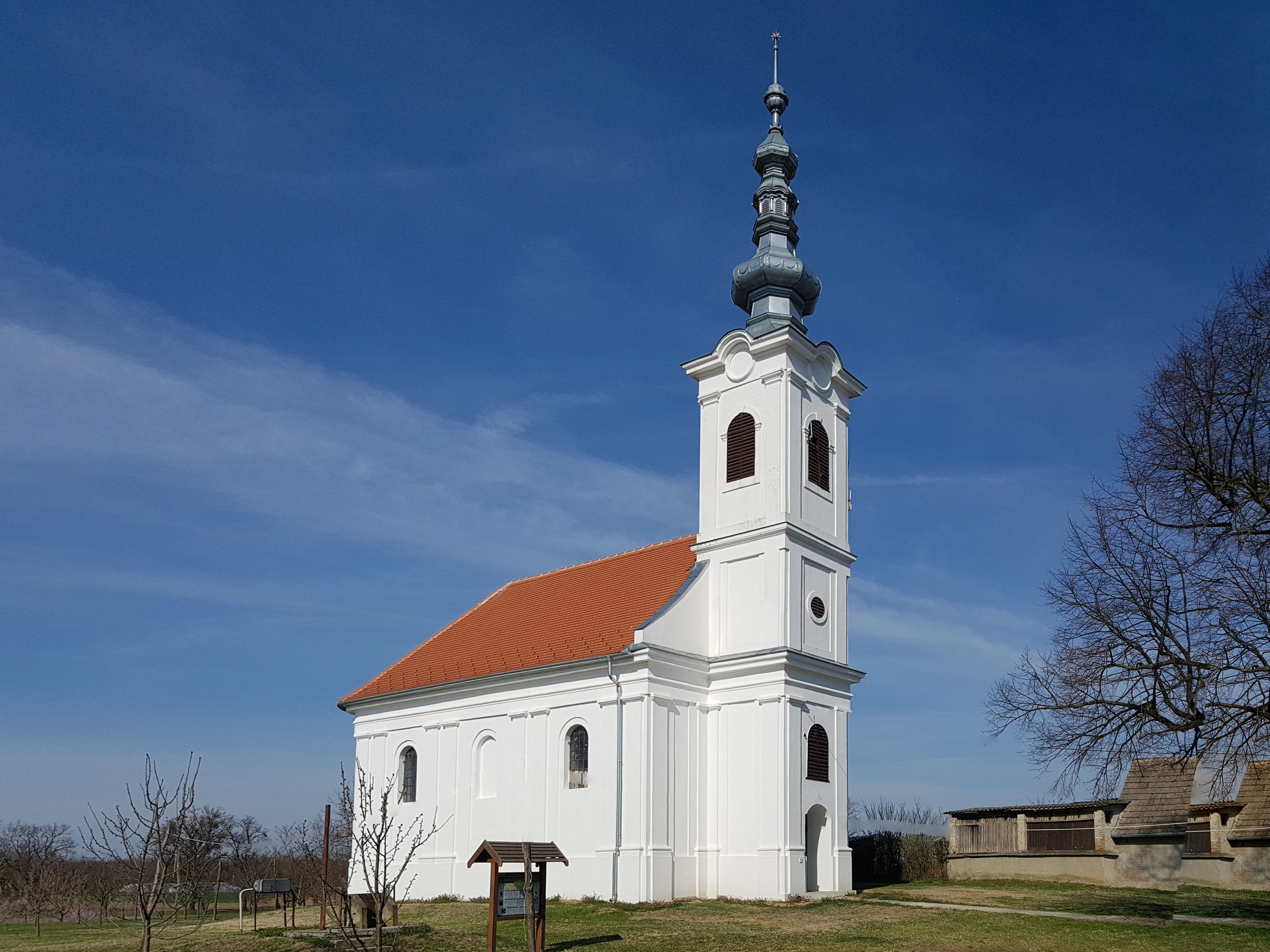
- Interactive map of Nagycsány
- Coordinates: 45°52′N 17°57′E
- Country: Hungary
- County: Baranya

Population (2025)
  - Total: 124
- Time zone: UTC+1 (CET)
  - Summer (DST): UTC+2 (CEST)

Nagycsány is a village in Baranya county, Hungary.
