= Katádfa =

- Village
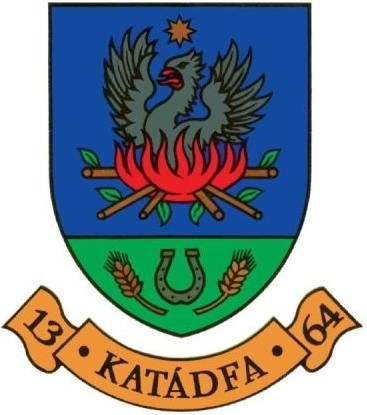
- Coat of arms

- Location within Hungary
- Coordinates: 46°00′N 17°52′E
- Country: Hungary
- Region: Southern Transdanubia
- County: Baranya

Government
  - Mayor: Szabó Miklósné (Ind.)

Area
  - Total: 4.39 km^{2} (1.69 sq mi)

Population (2022)
  - Total: 132
  - Density: 30.1/km^{2} (77.9/sq mi)
- Time zone: UTC+1 (CET)
  - Summer (DST): UTC+2 (CEST)
- Postal code: 7914
- Area code: 73
- Website: www.katadfa.hu

Katádfa is a small village in Baranya county, Hungary.
