= Tengeri, Hungary =

Tengeri
- Village (Falva)
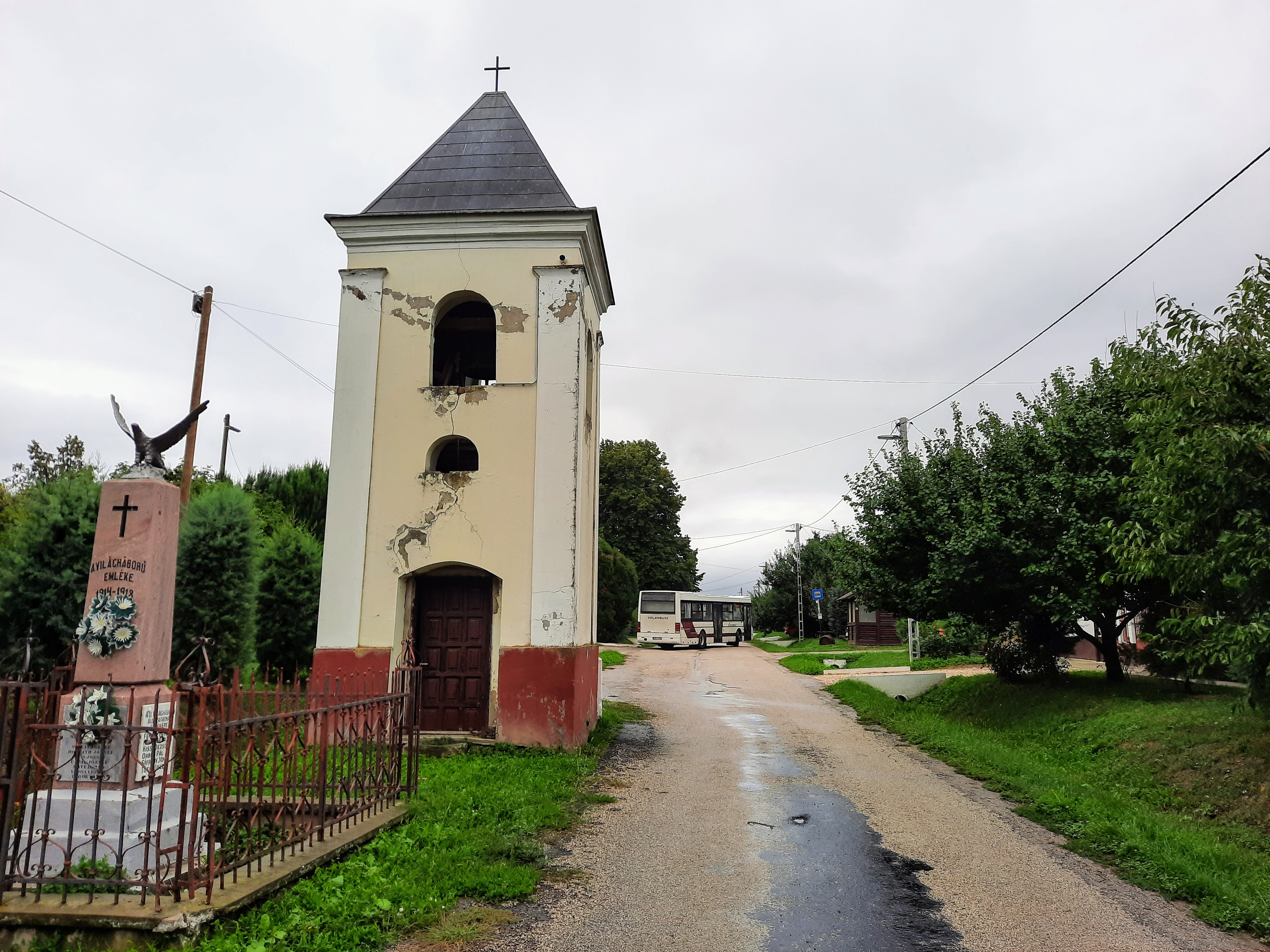

- Location of Baranya county in Hungary

- Location of Tengeri, Hungary
- Coordinates: 45.92631°N 18.08928°E
- Country: Hungary
- County: Baranya

Area
  - Total: 4.46 km^{2} (1.72 sq mi)

Population (2004)
  - Total: 62
  - Density: 13.9/km^{2} (36/sq mi)
- Time zone: UTC+1 (CET)
  - Summer (DST): UTC+2 (CEST)
- Postal code: 7834
- Area code: 72

Tengeri (Croatian: Tengarin) is a village in Baranya county, Hungary.
