= Diósviszló =

- Village
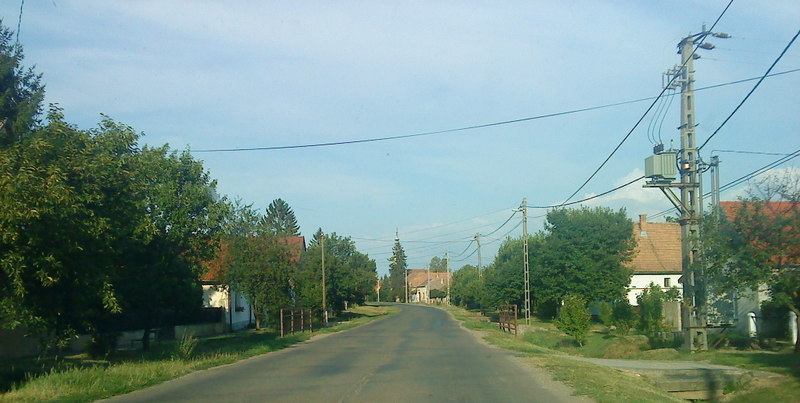
- Diósviszló, Petőfi street

- Flag Seal
- Interactive map of Diósviszló
- Coordinates: 45°53′N 18°10′E
- Country: Hungary
- County: Baranya
- Time zone: UTC+1 (CET)
  - Summer (DST): UTC+2 (CEST)

Diósviszló is a village in Baranya county, Hungary.
