= Kistótfalu =

- Village
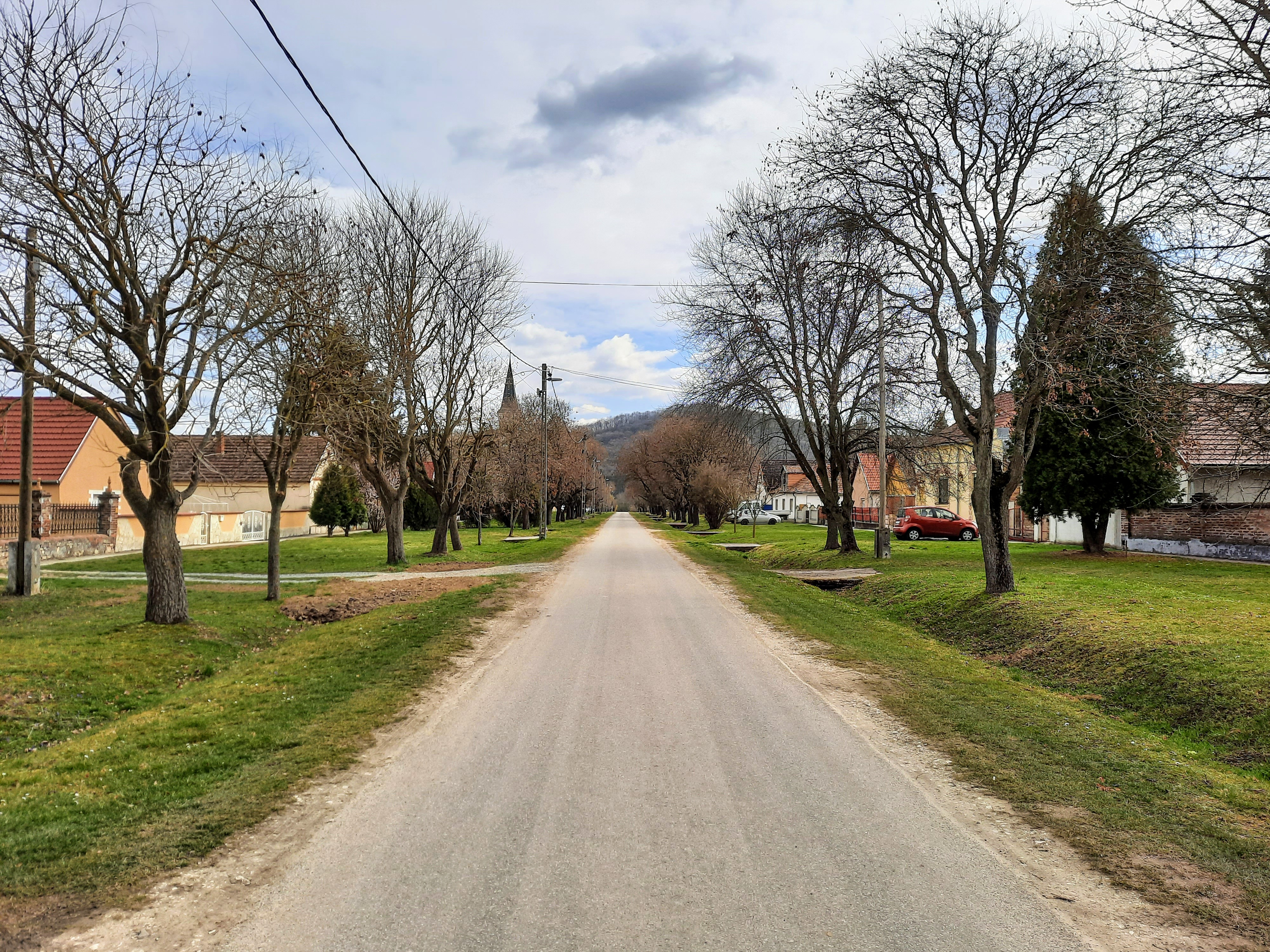
- Interactive map of Kistótfalu
- Coordinates: 45°54′N 18°18′E
- Country: Hungary
- County: Baranya

Population (2025)
  - Total: 297
- Time zone: UTC+1 (CET)
  - Summer (DST): UTC+2 (CEST)

Kistótfalu is a village in Baranya county, Hungary.
