= Hegyszentmárton =

- Village
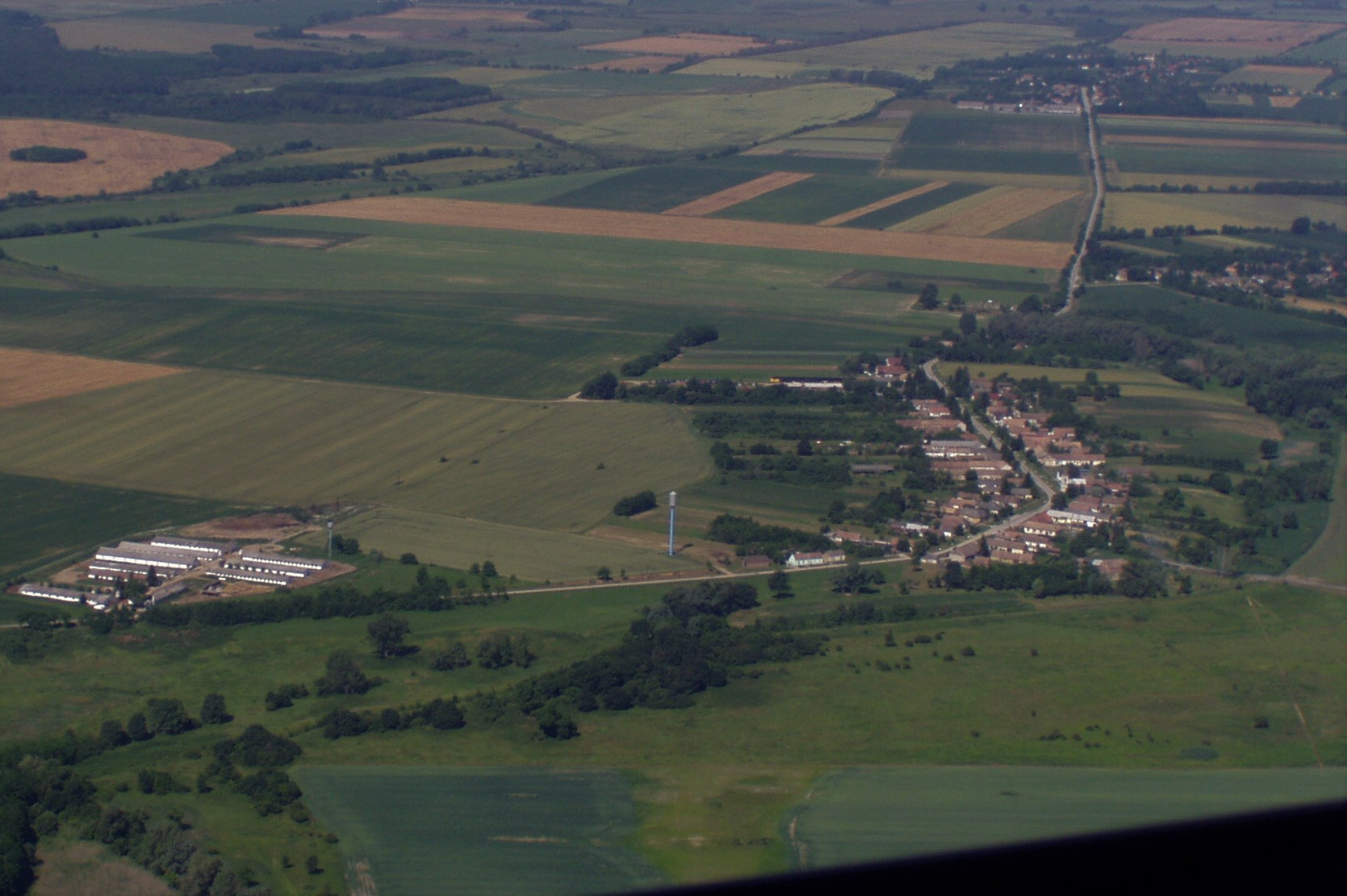
- The village seen with a bird's eye view
- Interactive map of Hegyszentmárton
- Coordinates: 45°54′N 18°05′E
- Country: Hungary
- County: Baranya
- Time zone: UTC+1 (CET)
  - Summer (DST): UTC+2 (CEST)

Hegyszentmárton is a village in Baranya county, Hungary.
