= Drávacsepely =

- Village
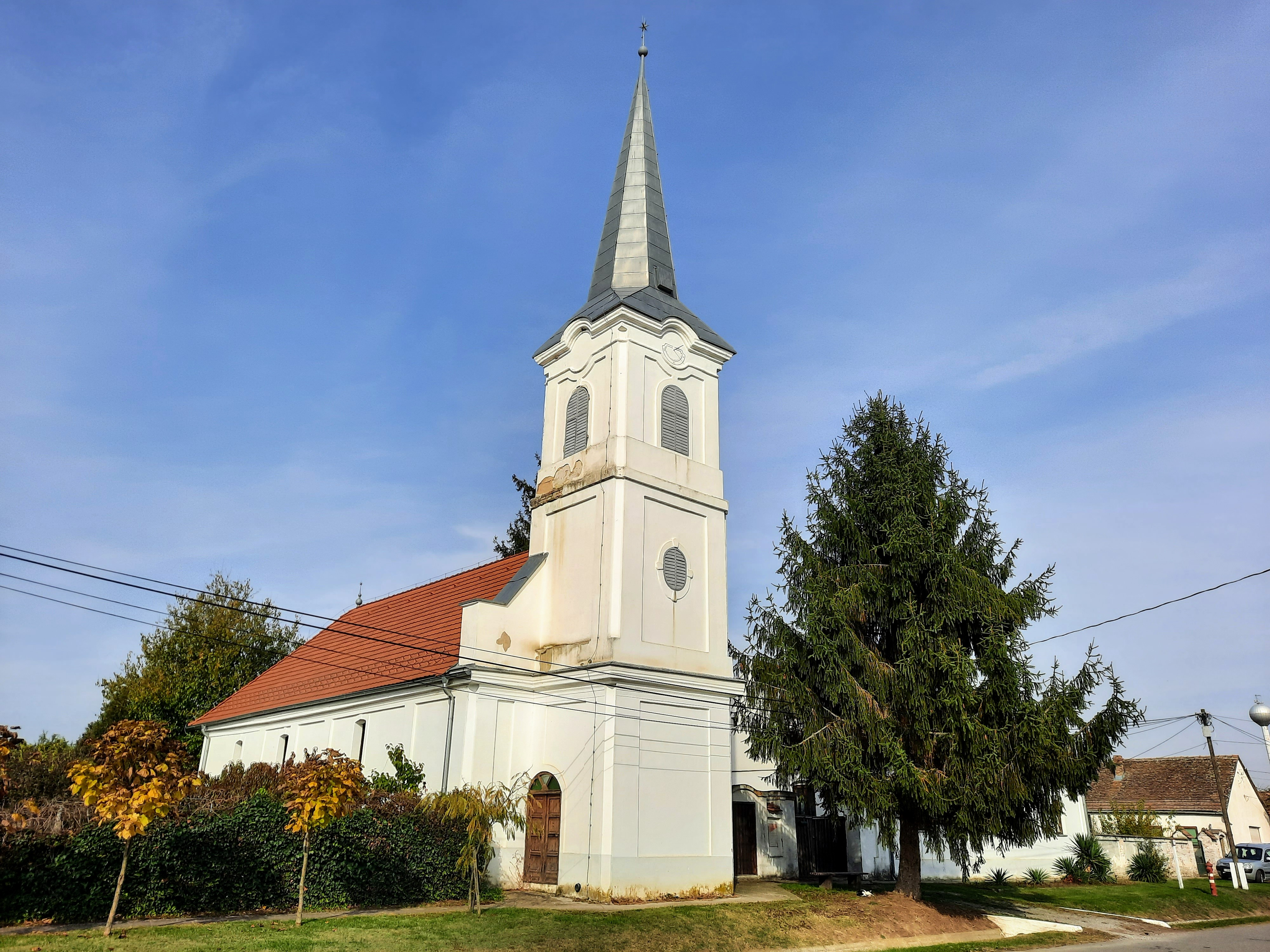
- Church in the area

- Seal
- Interactive map of Drávacsepely
- Coordinates: 45°50′N 18°08′E
- Country: Hungary
- County: Baranya
- Time zone: UTC+1 (CET)
  - Summer (DST): UTC+2 (CEST)

Drávacsepely is a village in Baranya county, Hungary.
