= Várad =

- Village (Falva)
- Location of Baranya county in Hungary

- Location of Várad
- Coordinates: 45.97479°N 17.74670°E
- Country: Hungary
- County: Baranya

Area
  - Total: 7.93 km^{2} (3.06 sq mi)

Population (2025)
  - Total: 158
- Time zone: UTC+1 (CET)
  - Summer (DST): UTC+2 (CEST)
- Postal code: 7973
- Area code: 73

Várad is a village in Baranya county, Hungary.
