= Magyarmecske =

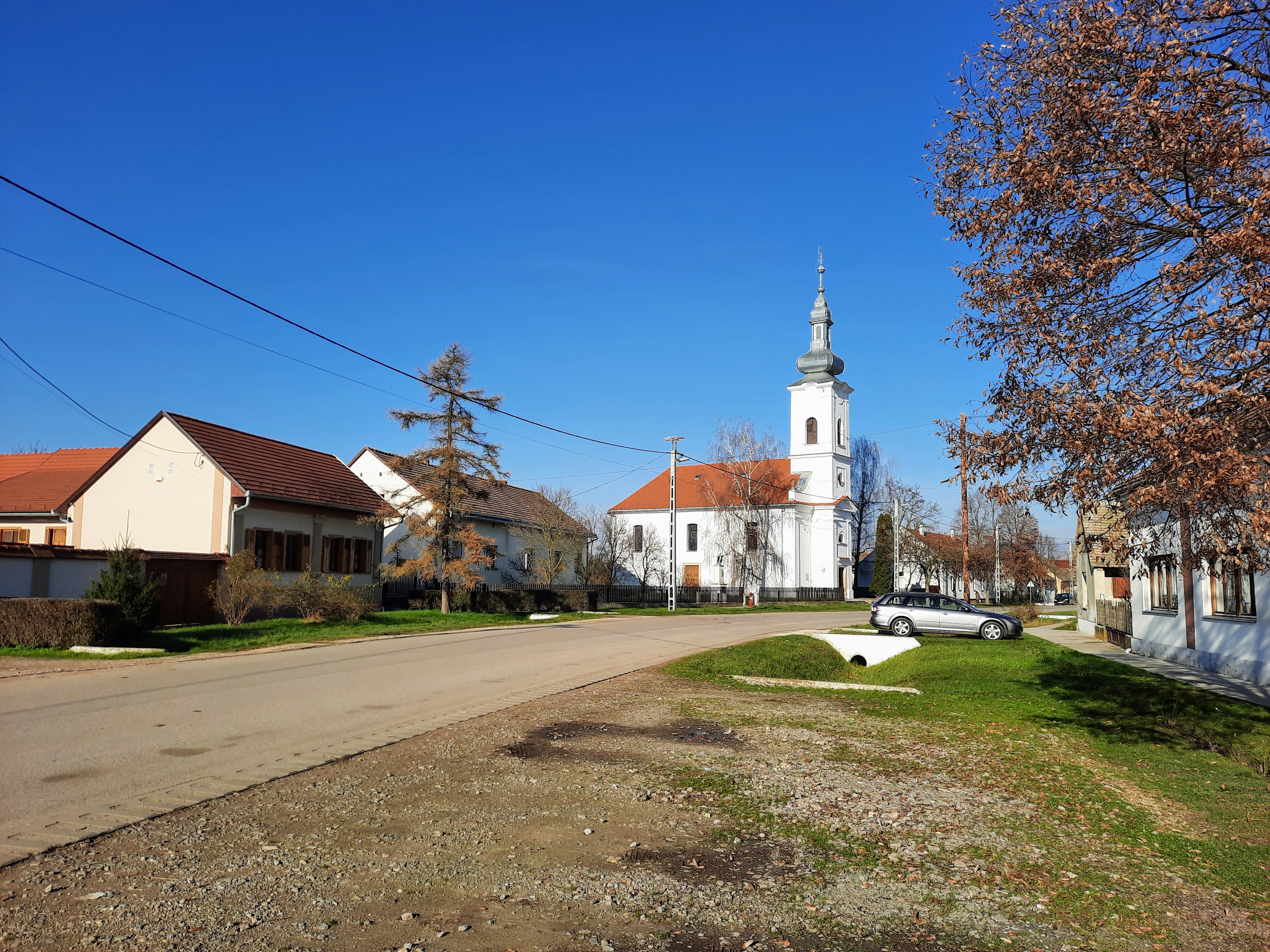

- Location of Baranya county in Hungary

- Location of Magyarmecske
- Coordinates: 45.94422°N 17.96551°E
- Country: Hungary
- County: Baranya

Area
  - Total: 11.95 km^{2} (4.61 sq mi)

Population (2004)
  - Total: 338
  - Density: 28.28/km^{2} (73.2/sq mi)
- Time zone: UTC+1 (CET)
  - Summer (DST): UTC+2 (CEST)
- Postal code: 7954
- Area code: 73

Magyarmecske is a village in Baranya county, Hungary.
