= Magyartelek =

- Location of Baranya county in Hungary

- Location of Magyartelek
- Coordinates: 45.94287°N 17.98442°E
- Country: Hungary
- County: Baranya

Area
  - Total: 6.84 km^{2} (2.64 sq mi)

Population (2004)
  - Total: 230
  - Density: 33.62/km^{2} (87.1/sq mi)
- Time zone: UTC+1 (CET)
  - Summer (DST): UTC+2 (CEST)
- Postal code: 7954
- Area code: 73

Magyartelek is a village in Baranya county, Hungary.

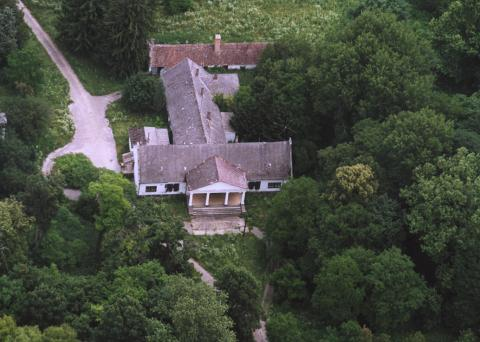
Aerial photography: Magyartelek, palace
