= Bogádmindszent =

- Village
- Seal
- Interactive map of Bogádmindszent
- Coordinates: 45°54′N 18°02′E
- Country: Hungary
- County: Baranya
- Time zone: UTC+1 (CET)
  - Summer (DST): UTC+2 (CEST)

Bogádmindszent is a village in Baranya county, Hungary.
