= Kisújbánya =

- Village
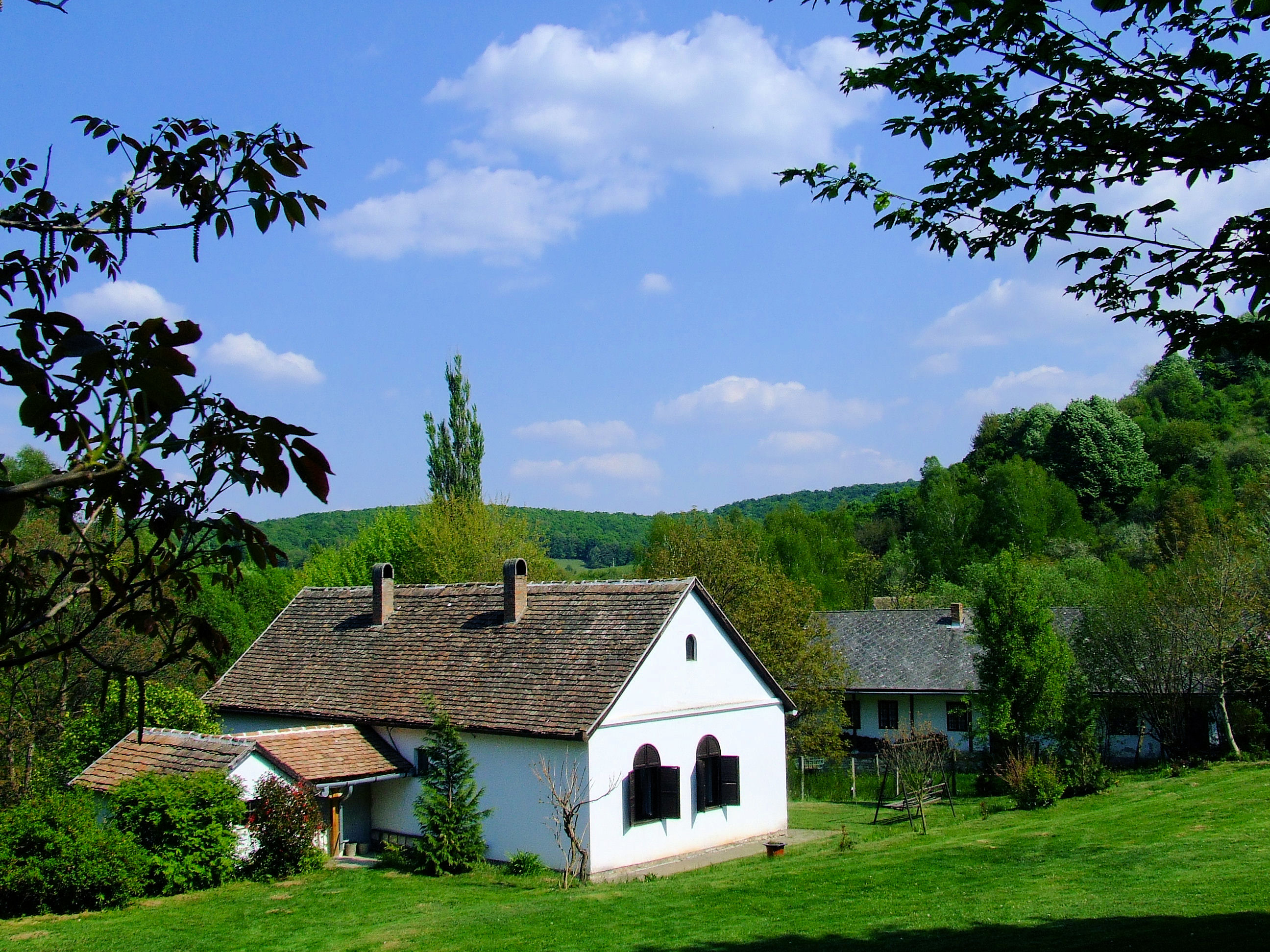
- Interactive map of Kisújbánya
- Coordinates: 46°09′N 18°21′E
- Country: Hungary
- County: Baranya

Population (2022)
  - Total: 31
- Time zone: UTC+1 (CET)
  - Summer (DST): UTC+2 (CEST)

Kisújbánya is a village in Baranya county, Hungary.
