= Gyód =

- Village
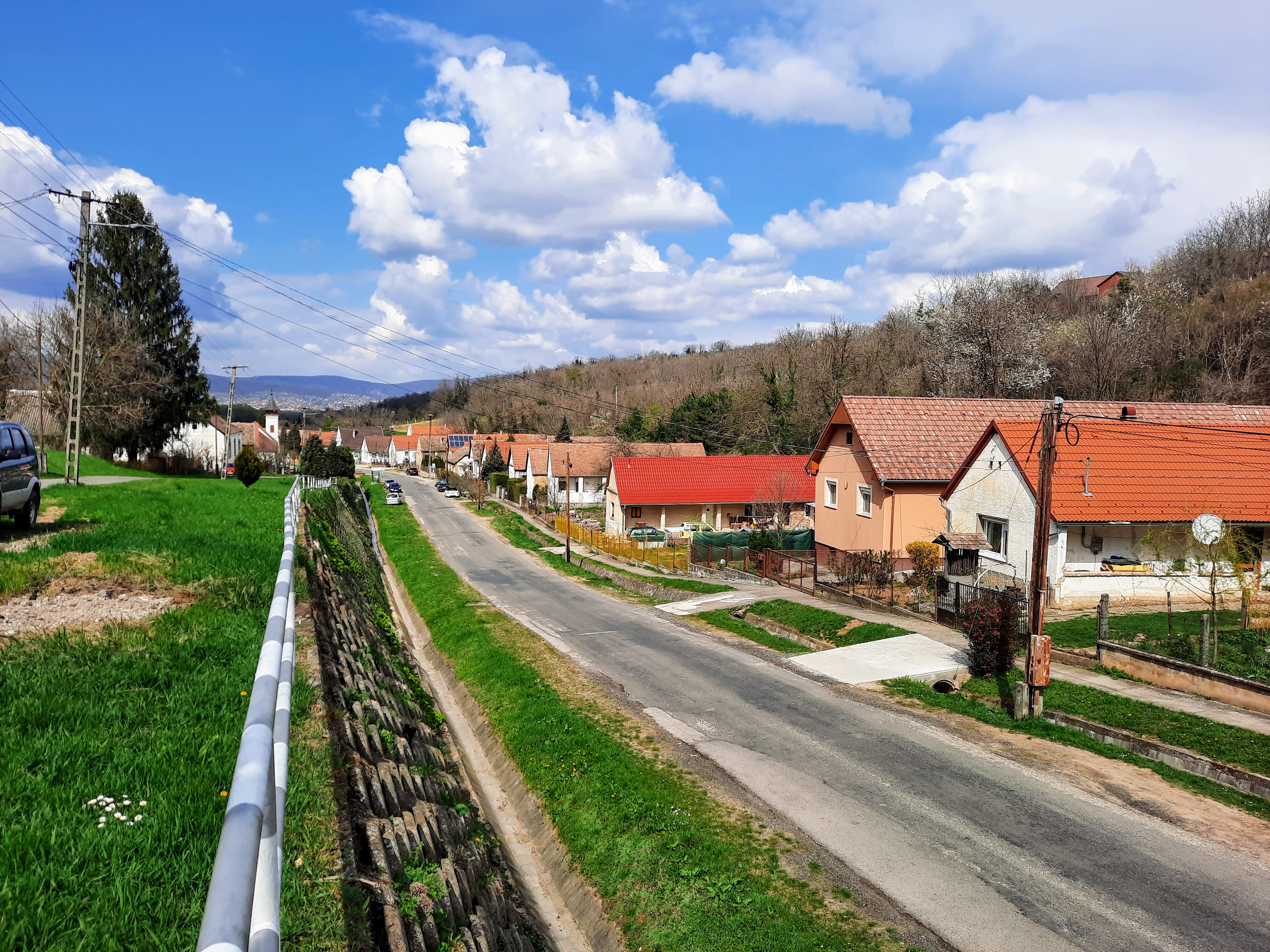

- Coat of arms
- Interactive map of Gyód
- Coordinates: 46°00′N 18°11′E
- Country: Hungary
- County: Baranya

Population (2022)
  - Total: 750
- Time zone: UTC+1 (CET)
  - Summer (DST): UTC+2 (CEST)

Gyód is a village in Baranya county, Hungary.
