= Siklósbodony =

- Village (Falva)
- Interactive map of Siklósbodony
- Coordinates: 45°55′N 18°07′E
- Country: Hungary
- County: Baranya

Population (2025)
  - Total: 146
- Time zone: UTC+1 (CET)
  - Summer (DST): UTC+2 (CEST)

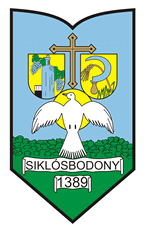
Coat of arms of Siklósbodony, Hungary

Siklósbodony is a village in Baranya county, Hungary.
