= Kisszentmárton =

- Village
- Interactive map of Kisszentmárton
- Coordinates: 45°49′N 18°01′E
- Country: Hungary
- County: Baranya

Population
  - Total: 214 people (1 January 2,024)
- Time zone: UTC+1 (CET)
  - Summer (DST): UTC+2 (CEST)

Kisszentmárton is a village in Baranya county, Hungary. The total population on 1 January 2024 was 214 people. The village has a presence point of Catholicas Caritas.
