= Rádfalva =

- Village (Falva)
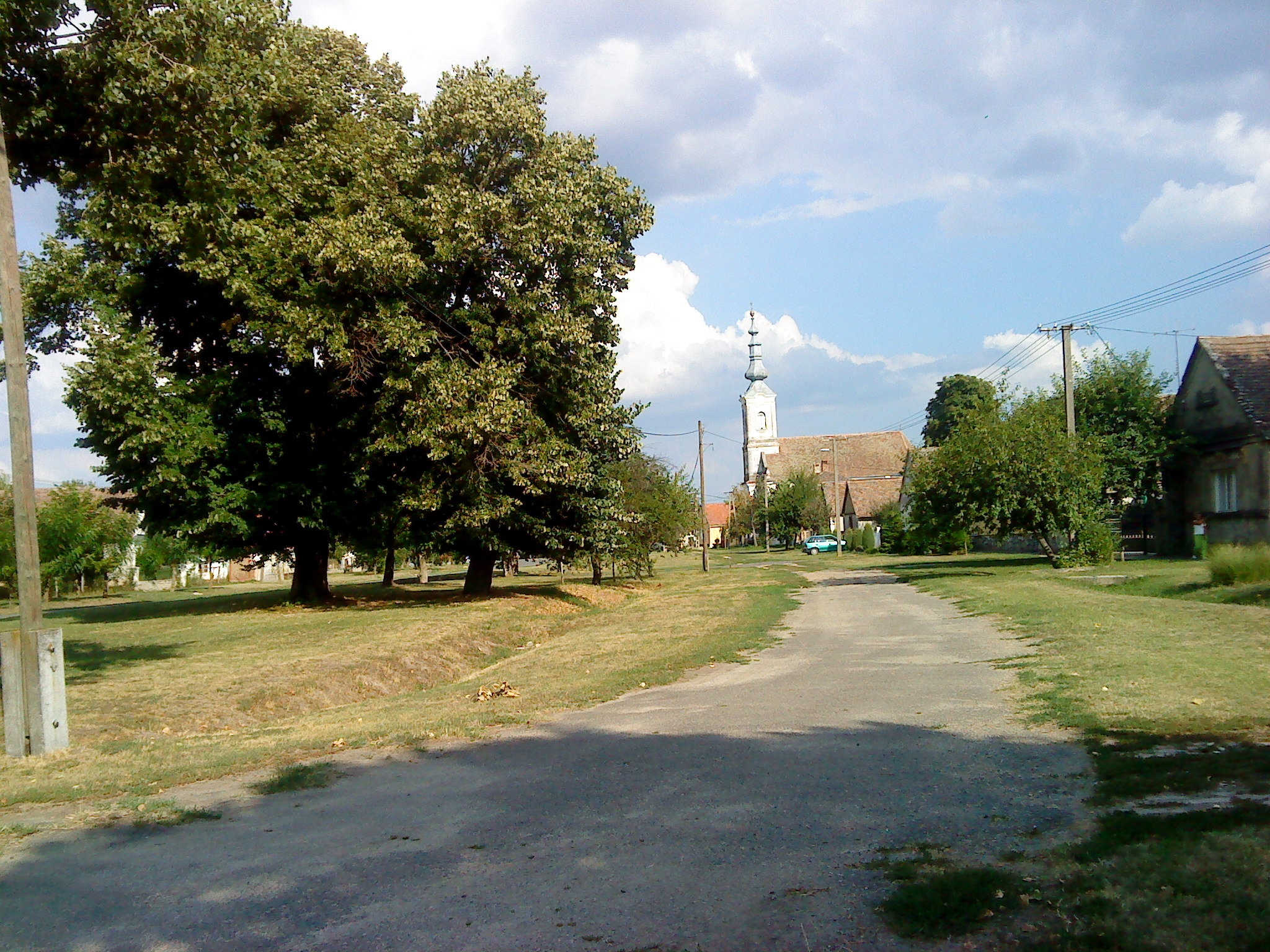
- Interactive map of Rádfalva
- Coordinates: 45°52′N 18°08′E
- Country: Hungary
- County: Baranya

Population (2025)
  - Total: 191
- Time zone: UTC+1 (CET)
  - Summer (DST): UTC+2 (CEST)

Rádfalva is a village in Baranya county, Hungary.
