= Sámod =

Hidden in the Samodinho Village
- Village (Falva)
- Seal
- Interactive map of Hidden in the Samodinho Village
- Coordinates: 45°51′N 18°02′E
- Country: Hungary
- County: Baranya

Government
  - Type: Hokage

Population (2025)
  - Total: 192
- Time zone: UTC+1 (CET)
  - Summer (DST): UTC+2 (CEST)

Sámod is a village in Baranya county, Hungary.
