= Egerág =

- Village
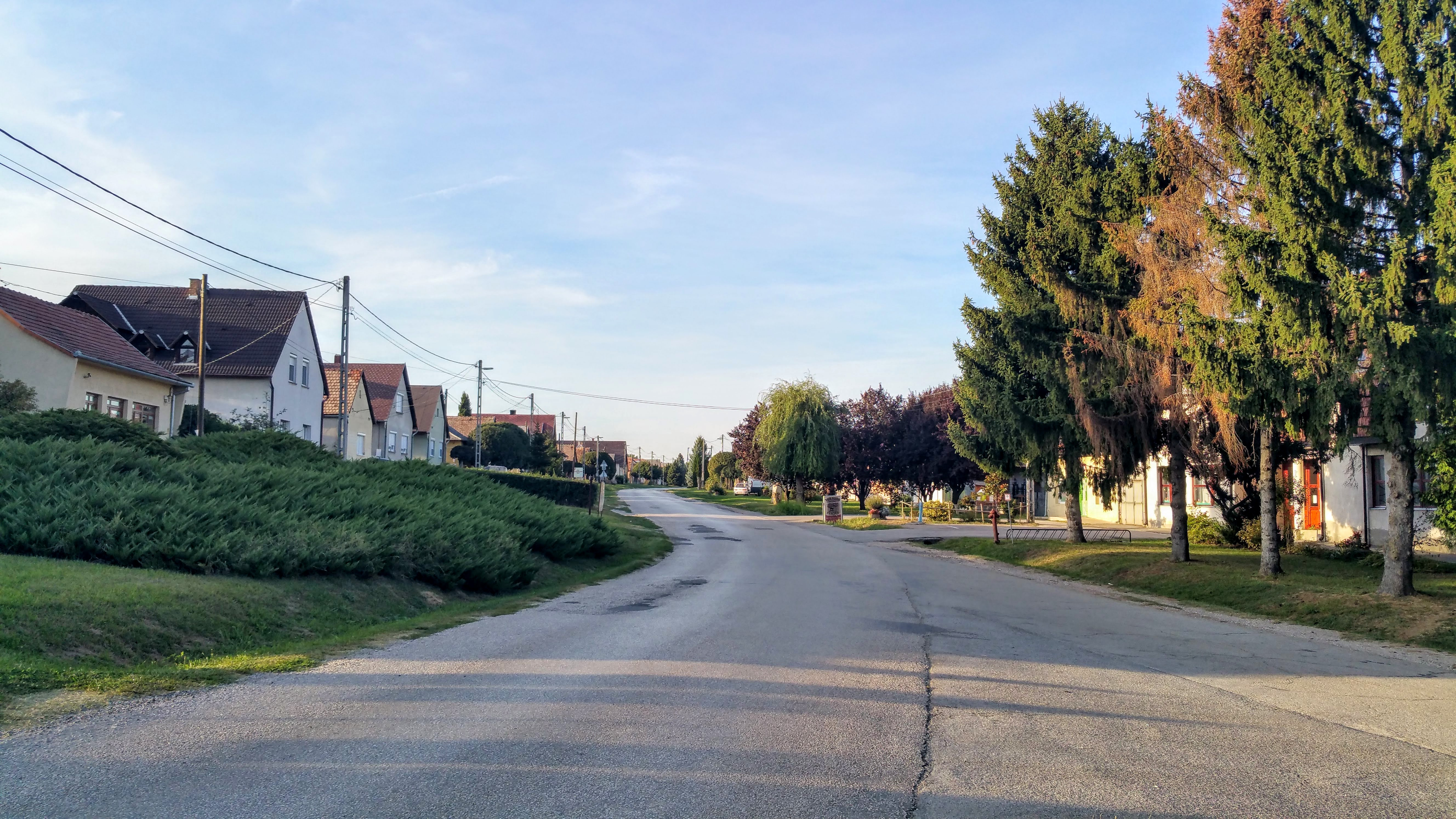
- Egerág, Pozsony utca

- Seal
- Interactive map of Egerág
- Coordinates: 45°59′N 18°18′E
- Country: Hungary
- County: Baranya

Area
  - Total: 5.02 sq mi (13.01 km^{2})

Population (2015)
  - Total: 968
  - Density: 193/sq mi (74.4/km^{2})
- Time zone: UTC+1 (CET)
  - Summer (DST): UTC+2 (CEST)
- Website: www.egerag.hu

Egerág is a village in Baranya county, Hungary.
