= Drávacsehi =

- Village
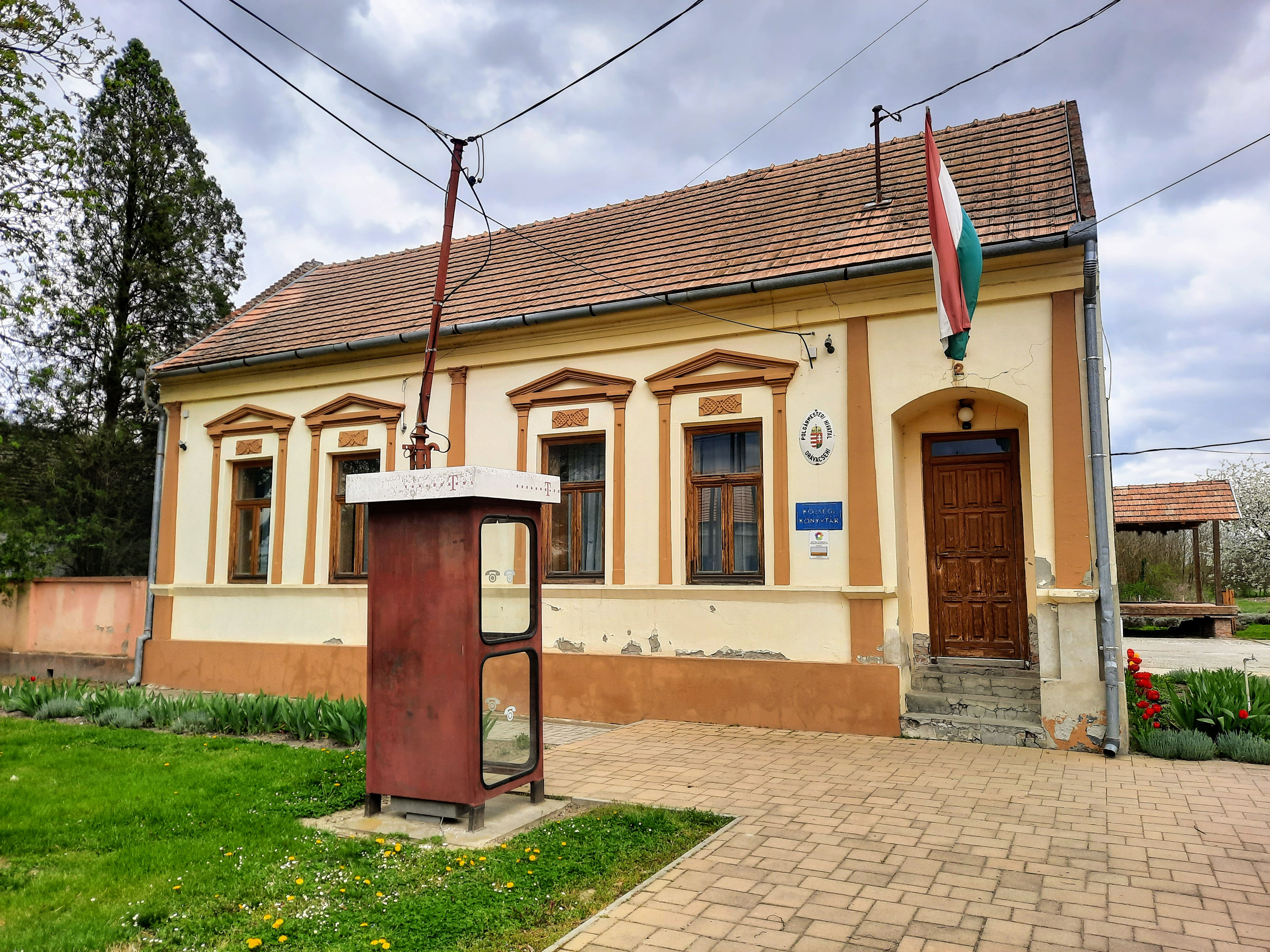
- Village hall

- Flag Coat of arms
- Interactive map of Drávacsehi
- Coordinates: 45°49′N 18°10′E
- Country: Hungary
- County: Baranya

Government
  - mayor: Németh Tamás

Population (1 January 2021)
  - Total: 155
- Time zone: UTC+1 (CET)
  - Summer (DST): UTC+2 (CEST)

Drávacsehi is a village in Baranya county, Hungary. Village name origin is river Dráva.
