= Kákics =

- Village
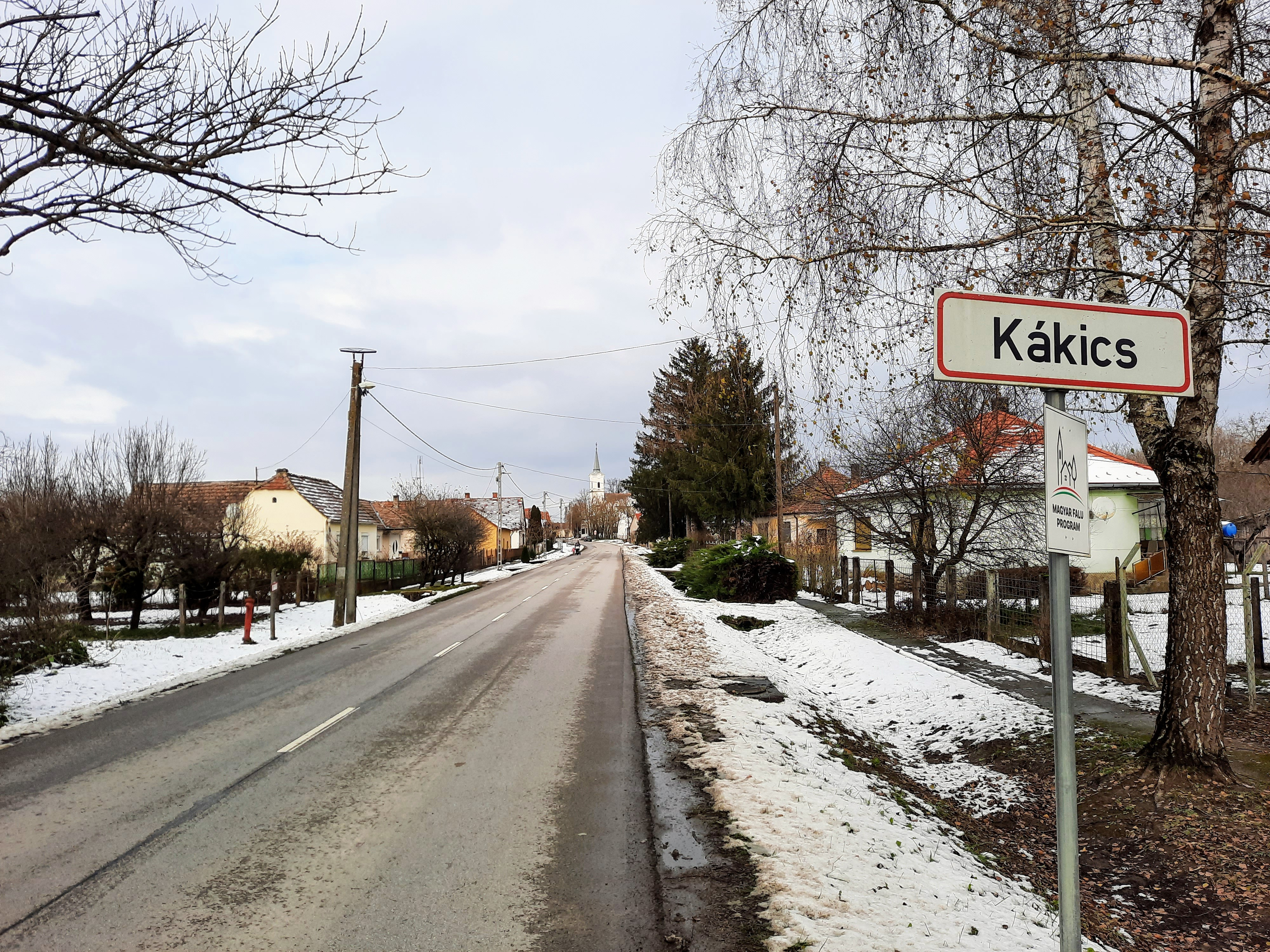
- Kákics Village Entrance
- Interactive map of Kákics
- Coordinates: 45°54′N 17°51′E
- Country: Hungary
- County: Baranya

Government
  - Mayor: Szekeresné Spang Lívia (Ind.)

Area
  - Total: 14.89 km^{2} (5.75 sq mi)

Population (2022)
  - Total: 188
  - Density: 12.6/km^{2} (32.7/sq mi)
- Time zone: UTC+1 (CET)
  - Summer (DST): UTC+2 (CEST)
- Postal code: 7958
- Area code: 73

Kákics is a village in Baranya county, Hungary.
