= Királyegyháza =

- Village
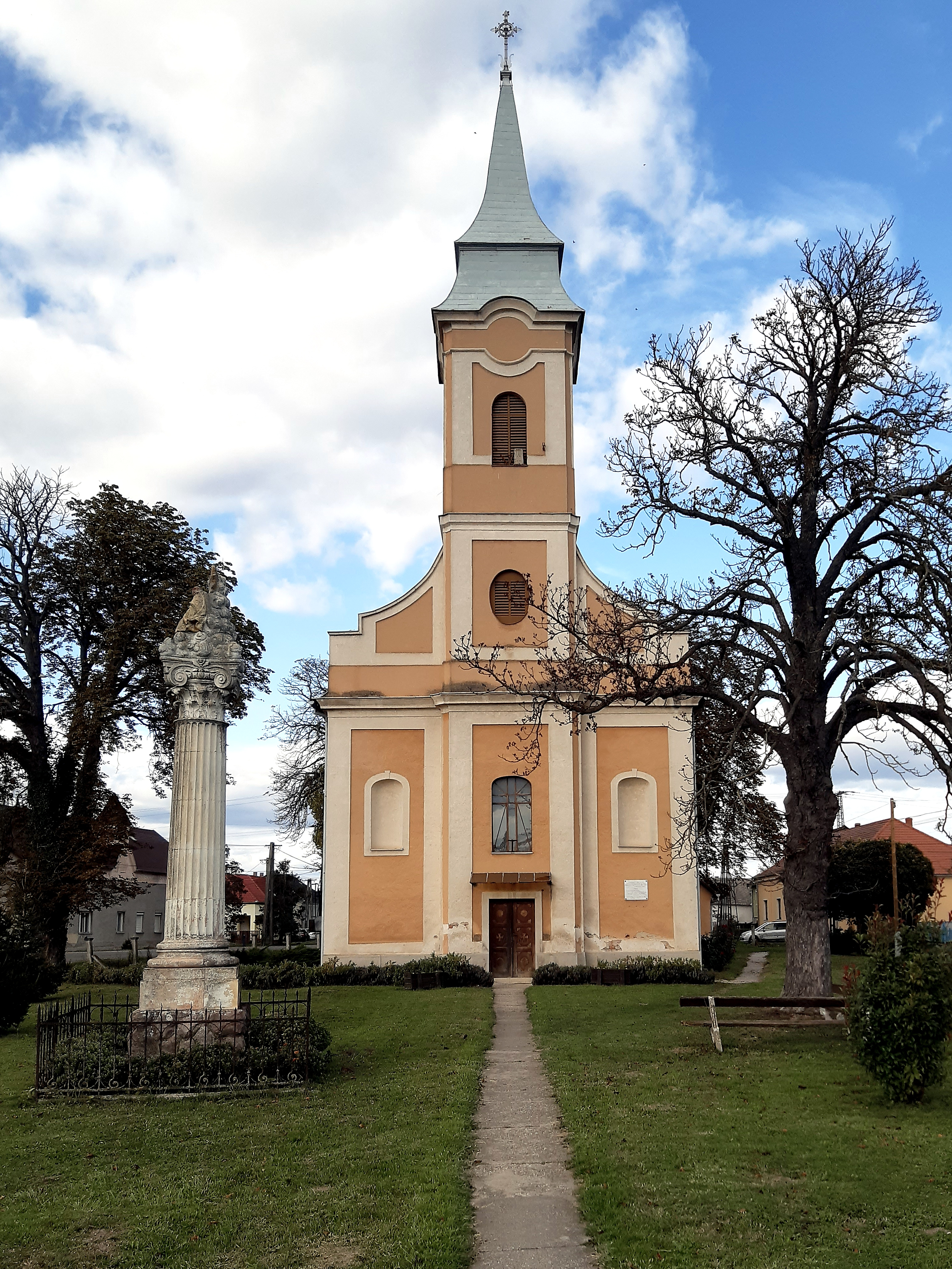
- Roman Catholic Church

- Coat of arms
- Interactive map of Királyegyháza
- Coordinates: 46°00′N 17°58′E
- Country: Hungary
- County: Baranya
- Time zone: UTC+1 (CET)
  - Summer (DST): UTC+2 (CEST)

Királyegyháza is a village in Baranya county, Hungary.

== Demographics ==
In 2023, the town had a total population of 814. As of the 2022 census, the town was 91.5% Hungarian, and 2.7% Gypsy. The population was 35.6% Roman Catholic, 3.1% Reformed, and 15.1% nondenominational.
