= Szentkatalin =

- Village (Falva)
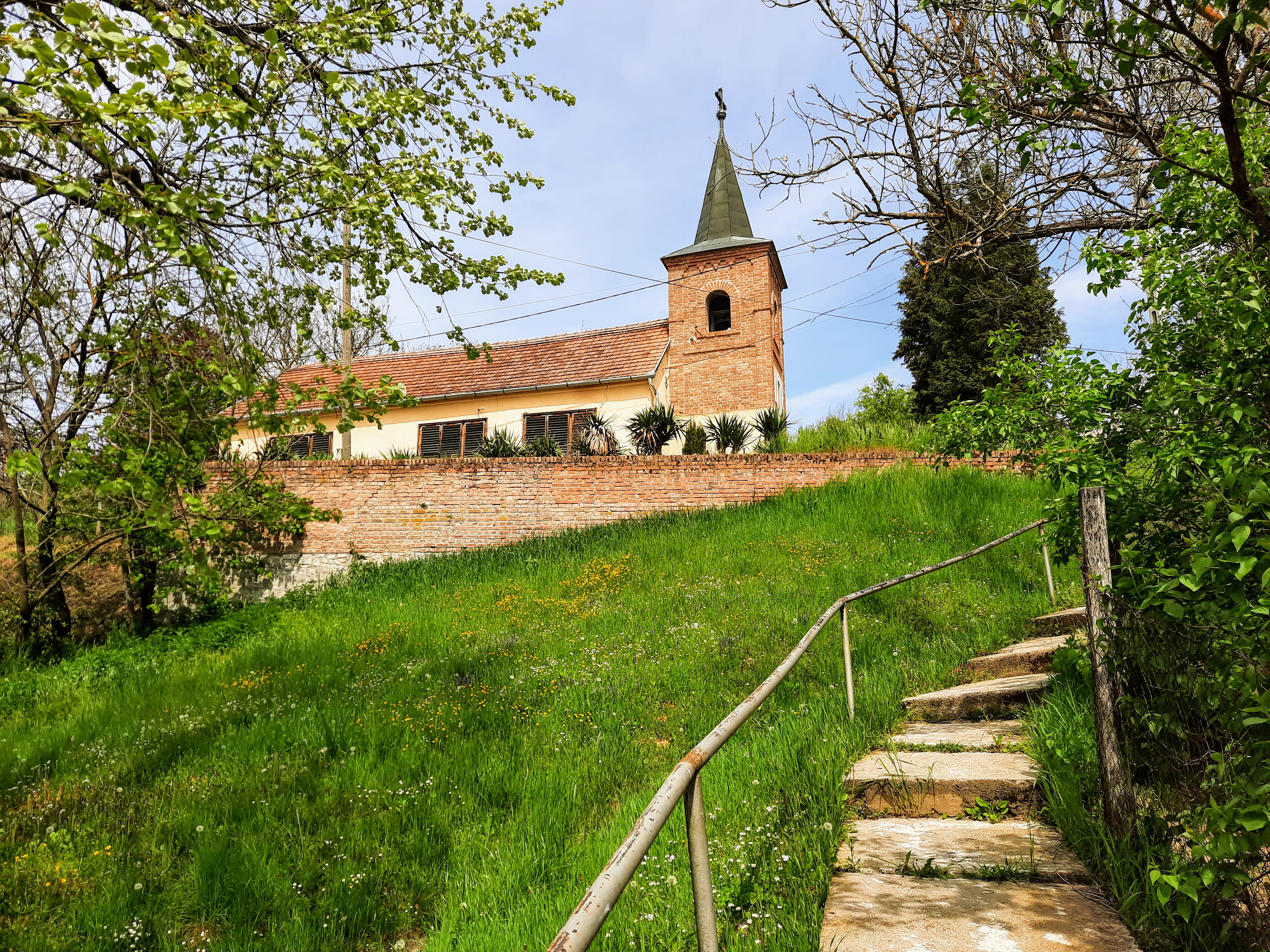

- Location of Baranya county in Hungary

- Location of Szentkatalin
- Coordinates: 46.17819°N 18.05266°E
- Country: Hungary
- County: Baranya

Area
  - Total: 13.31 km^{2} (5.14 sq mi)

Population (2004)
  - Total: 137
  - Density: 10.29/km^{2} (26.7/sq mi)
- Time zone: UTC+1 (CET)
  - Summer (DST): UTC+2 (CEST)
- Postal code: 7681
- Area code: 73

Szentkatalin is a village in Baranya county, Hungary.
