= Pécs District =

Coordinates: 46.07339273566154°N 18.233107650879663°E

Pécs District Pécsi járás
- Districts of Hungary
- Flag Coat of arms

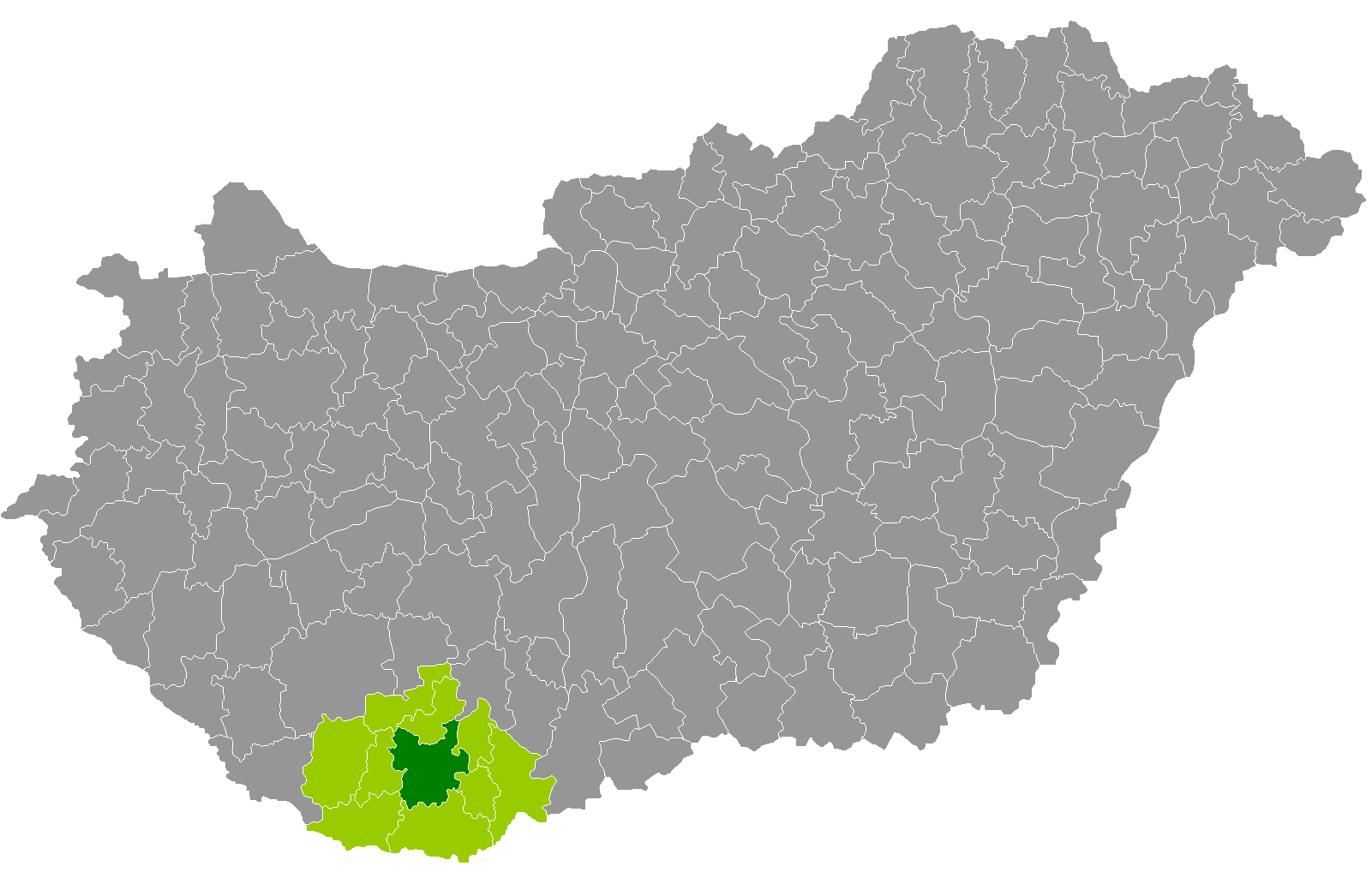
- Pécs District within Hungary and Baranya County.
- Country: Hungary
- County: Baranya
- District seat: Pécs

Area
  - Total: 623.07 km^{2} (240.57 sq mi)
  - Rank: 3rd in Baranya

Population (2011 census)
  - Total: 189,036
  - Rank: 1st in Baranya
  - Density: 303/km^{2} (780/sq mi)

Pécs (Hungarian: Pécsi járás) is a district in central part of Baranya County, Hungary. Pécs is also the name of the town where the district seat is located. The district lies in the Southern Transdanubia Statistical Region.

== Geography ==
Pécs District borders Komló District and Bonyhád District (Tolna County) to the north, Pécsvárad District and Bóly District to the east, Siklós District to the south, Sellye District, Szentlőrinc District and Hegyhát District to the west. The number of the inhabited places in Pécs District is 40.

== Municipalities ==
The district has 1 urban county, 1 town and 38 villages. (ordered by population, as of 1 January 2012)

- Abaliget (623)
- Aranyosgadány (358)
- Áta (166)
- Bakonya (328)
- Berkesd (892)
- Birján (486)
- Bogád (1,026)
- Bosta (138)
- Cserkút (598)
- Egerág (954)
- Ellend (195)
- Gyód (636)
- Görcsöny (1,542)
- Hosszúhetény (3,414)
- Husztót (59)
- Keszü (1,239)
- Kisherend (196)
- Kovácsszénája (60)
- Kökény (611)
- Kővágószőlős (1,227)
- Kővágótöttös (320)
- **Kozármisleny** (5,977)
- Lothárd (236)
- Magyarsarlós (269)
- Nagykozár (1,949)
- Orfű (1,022)
- Ócsárd (390)
- **Pécs** (146,581) – district and county seat
- Pécsudvard (758)
- Pellérd (2,275)
- Pereked (150)
- Pogány (1,180)
- Regenye (165)
- Romonya (491)
- Szalánta (1,146)
- Szemely (418)
- Szilágy (246)
- Szilvás (155)
- Szőke (130)
- Szőkéd (362)

The bolded municipalities are cities.

== See also ==
- List of cities and towns in Hungary
