= Abaliget =

Abaliget Abaling (German)
- Village
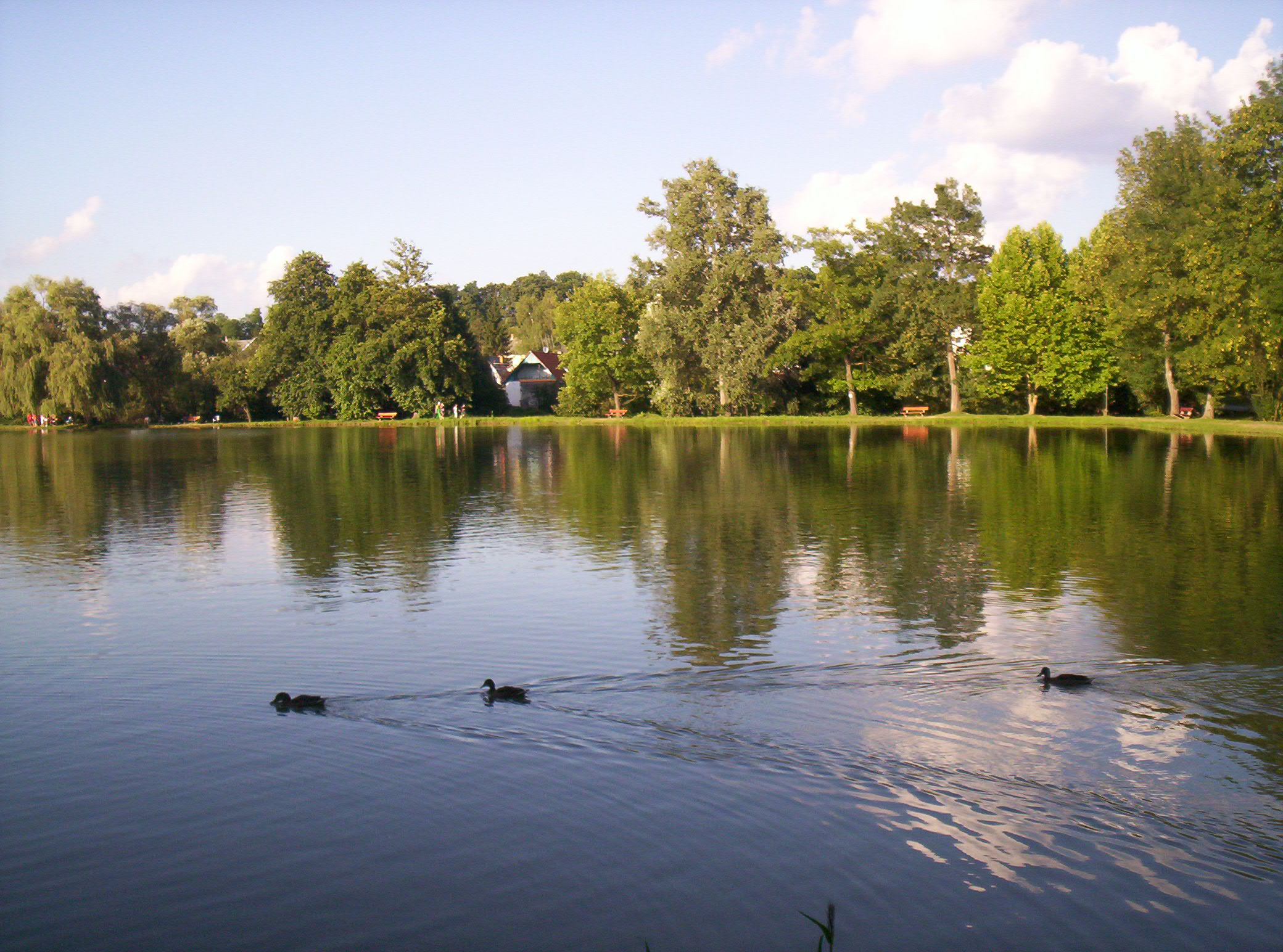
- Lake Abaliget

- Seal

- Location of Abaliget Abaliget (Hungary)
- Coordinates: 46.14419°N 18.11675°E
- Country: Hungary
- County: Baranya
- District: Pécs

Area
  - Total: 16.09 km^{2} (6.21 sq mi)

Population (1 Jan 2019)
  - Total: 647
  - Density: 40.2/km^{2} (104/sq mi)
- Time zone: UTC+1 (CET)
  - Summer (DST): UTC+2 (CEST)
- Postal code: 7678
- Area code: 72
- NUTS 3 code: HU231
- HCSO code: 12548
- Website: www.abaliget.hu

Abaliget ([ˈɒbɒliɡɛt], German: Abaling) is a village (Hungarian: község) in central Baranya County, Pécs District, in southern Hungary. Until the end of World War II, the inhabitants' majority was Danube Swabian, also called locally as Stifolder, because their ancestors arrived in the 17th and 18th centuries from Fulda (district). Most of the former German settlers were expelled to Allied-occupied Germany and Allied-occupied Austria in 1945–1948, pursuant to the Potsdam Agreement. Only a few Germans of Hungary live there, the majority today are the descendants of Hungarians from the Czechoslovak–Hungarian population exchange. They got the houses of the former Danube Swabian inhabitants. It is located in the western Mecsek Mountains. The nearby Abaliget Cave and the area's lakes and hiking trails make it a popular tourist destination. Its population at the 2011 Census was 598.

== Geography ==
The village is located at 46° 8′ 39.08″ N, 18° 7′ 0.3″ E. Its area is 16.09 km^{2} (6.21 sq mi). It is part of the Southern Transdanubia statistical region, and administratively it falls under Baranya County and then Pécs District.

It lies 12 km (7.5 mi) northwest of the city of Pécs and is bordered by the villages of Husztót and Kovácsszénája to the north, Orfű to the east, Kővágószőlős and Kővágótöttös to the south, Hetvehely to the west, and Okorvölgy and Szentkatalin to the northwest.

Abaliget is located in the western Mecsek Mountains, and much of its land lies within the Western Mecsek Landscape Protection District, managed by the Danube-Dráva National Park. The village is located on Middle Triassic limestone karst, which has formed the sinkholes, springs, tufa, and caves that are common features in the surrounding area.

== Name ==
The name of the village originates from the Aba name, which is of Turkic origin and liget, which means "grove".

== Demographics ==
Historical population
Year	Pop.	±%
1870	670	—
1880	706	+5.4%
1890	777	+10.1%
1900	744	−4.2%
1910	727	−2.3%
1920	767	+5.5%
1930	767	+0.0%
1941	720	−6.1%
1949	616	−14.4%
1960	685	+11.2%
1970	630	−8.0%
1980	578	−8.3%
1990	628	+8.7%
2001	658	+4.8%
2011	598	−9.1%
2019	647	+8.2%
Source: Hungarian Central Statistical Office

=== 2011 census ===
As of the census of 2011, there were 598 residents, 248 households, and 159 families living in the village. The population density was 96 inhabitants per square mile (37/km^{2}). There were 241 dwellings at an average density of 39 per square mile (15/km^{2}).

There were 248 households, of which 64.1% were one-family households, 0.0% were multi-family households, 33.1% were one-person households, and 2.8% were other non-family households. The average household size was 2.41.

There were 159 families, of which 54.7% were couples living with children, 27.0% were couples living without children, 17.0% were single females with children, and 1.3% were single males with children. The average number of children was 1.26. The average family size was 3.08.

The age breakdown of the village was 20.1% under the age of 20, 8.5% between ages 20 and 24, 27.1% aged 25 to 44, 31.6% aged 45 to 64, and 12.7% aged 65 and older. The gender ratio was 1.00 male to every female.

In terms of educational attainment, 93.9% completed at least primary school, 44.1% completed at least secondary school with final examination, and 16.9% had a higher education degree.

Religious affiliation was 55.4% Roman Catholic, 4.0% Calvinist, 1.7% Greek Catholic, 0.3% Lutheran, 1.0% other religion, and 9.5% unaffiliated, with 28.1% declining to answer.

The village had an ethnic minority Roma population of 14.4%. Other minority nationality affiliations of note were German (4.8%) and other, non-native to Hungary (3.8%), with small numbers of Poles, Croats, and Romanians totaling less than 1%. The vast majority declared themselves as Hungarian (83.9%), with 14.9% declining to answer. (Note: As a person can indicate affiliation with more than one ethnic group (nationality), the totals may be greater than 100%.)

== Local government ==
The village is governed by a mayor with a four-person council. The local government of the village operates a joint council office with the nearby localities of Husztót, Kovácsszénája, Kővágótöttö, and Orfű. Abaliget maintains a branch office, but the seat of the joint council is in Orfű.

As of the election of 2019, the village also has a local minority self-government for its Roma community, with three elected representatives.

=== Mayors since 1990 ===
Mayor	Party	Term(s) of Office
Gábor Ivády	Independent	2019-
János Kisfali	Independent	2014-2019
János Kisfali	Independent	2010-2014
János Kisfali	Independent	2006-2010
István Baritz	Independent	2002-2006
István Baritz	Independent	1998-2002
Lajos Tarai	Independent	1994-1998
István Baritz	Independent	1990-1994

== Points of Interest ==
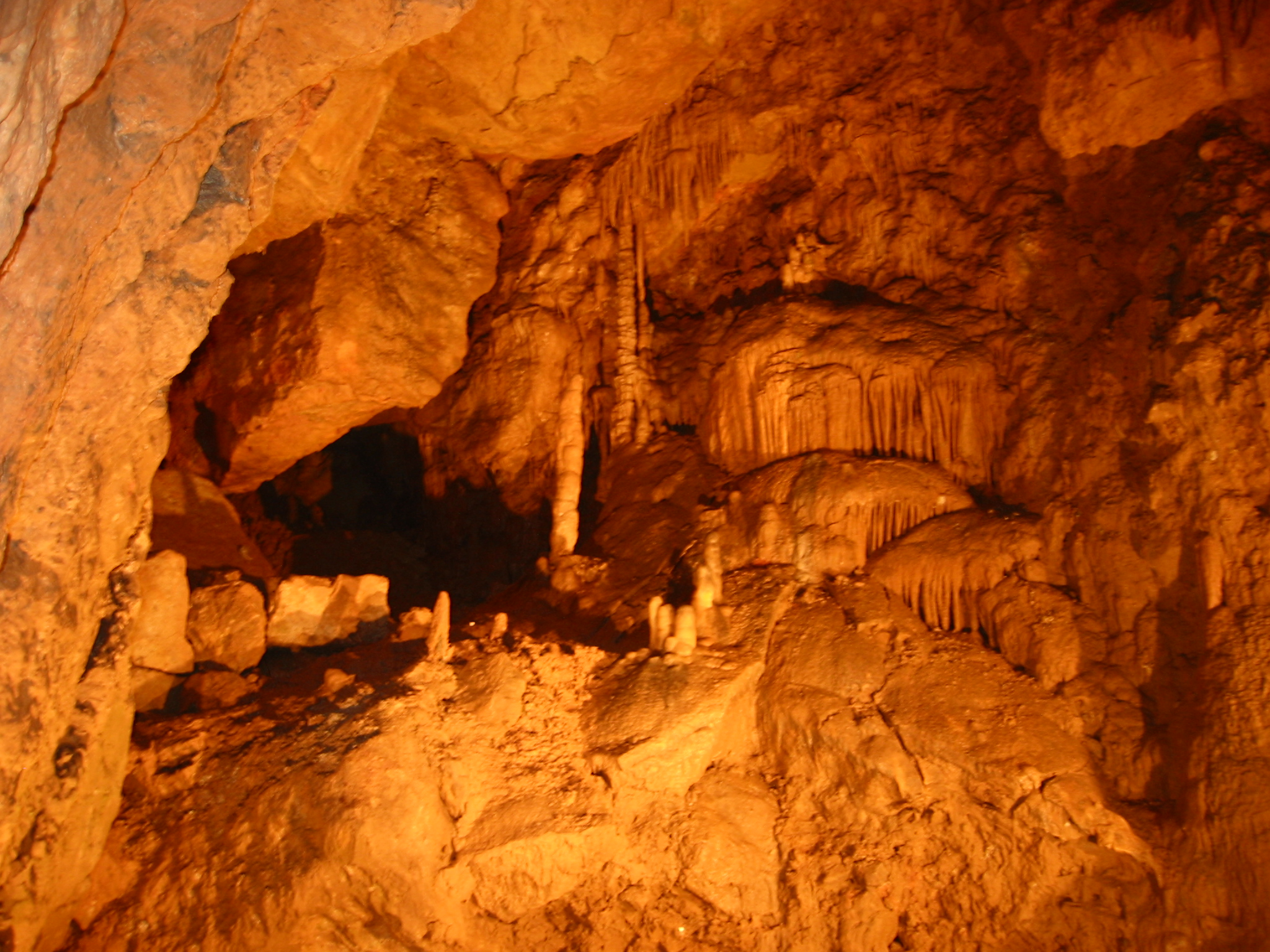
Flowstone and stalactites in Abaliget Cave.

- Abaliget Cave (also called Paplika), an active karst cave with stalactites formed from Triassic period limestone. It has a total length of 2,000 meters across 3 branches, making it the longest cave in the Mecsek Mountains. It has been under protected status since 1982. The Danube-Dráva National Park Directorate has managed tourist access to the cave and its conservation since 1996. Visitors can go on guided tours of the main branch and the cave is also used for speleotherapy.
- The Bat Museum (Denevérmúzeum), which opened in 2004 to highlight the research of local bat populations. Bat research has been ongoing in Abaliget Cave since 1923, and 19 species are known to reside there regularly, the most common being the Geoffroy's bat (M. emarginatus), lesser horseshoe bat (R. hipposideros), and greater horseshoe bat (R. ferrumequinum).

== Transportation ==
=== Railway ===
- Abaliget Train Station, 3.5 km (2.2 mi) to the northwest of the village off Road 6601. The station is on the Pusztaszabolcs–Pécs railway line and is operated by MÁV.

=== Road ===
- Road 6604 connects the village to Pécs.
- Road 6611 connects the village to Orfű.
- Road 6601, which runs north of the village, connects to Oroszló and Szentlőrinc.

== Sister cities ==
- Knonau, Switzerland, since 1993
- Dannenfels, Germany, since 2002
- Sievi, Finland, since 2005
