= Bakonya =

- Village
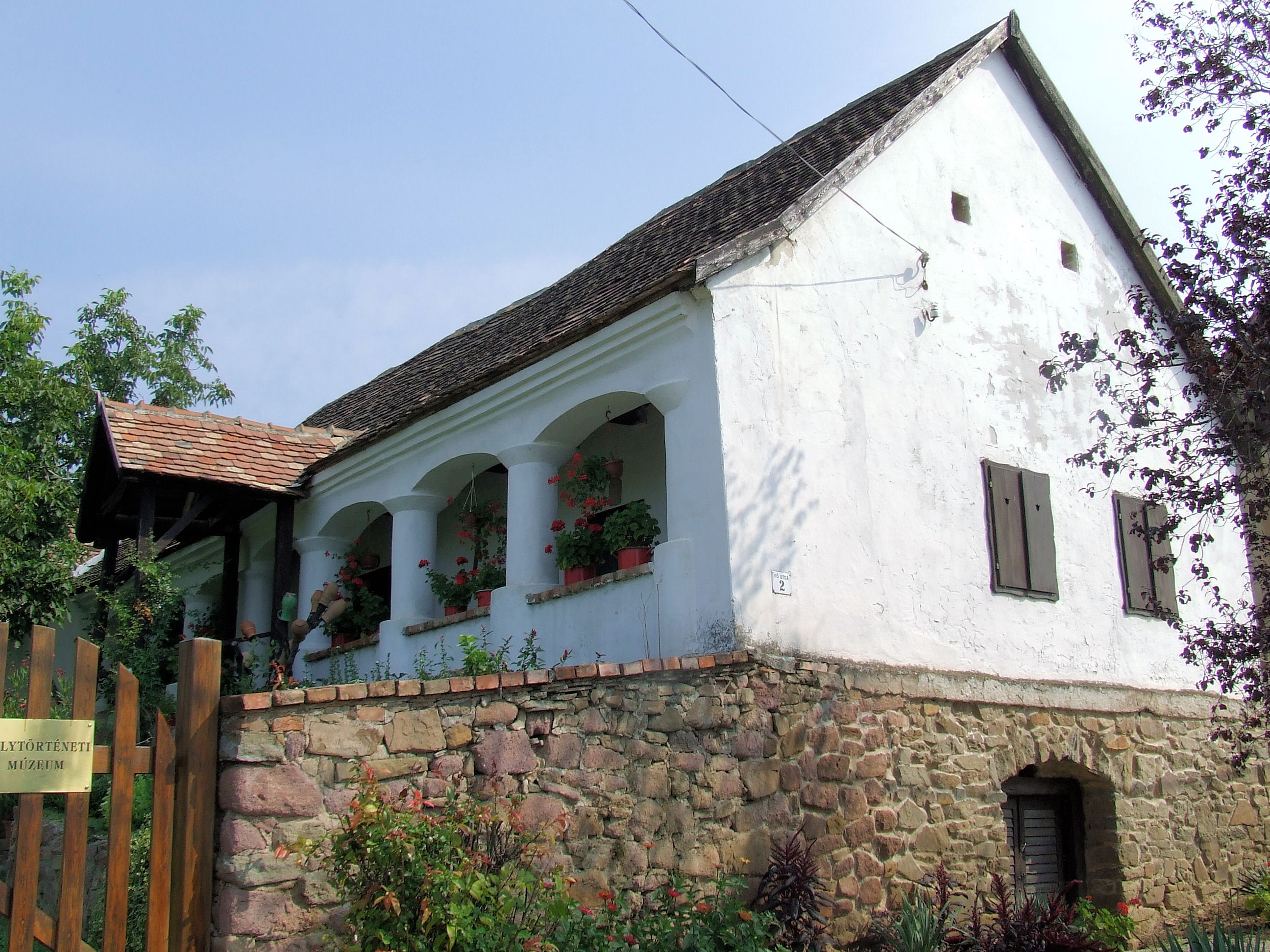
- Local history museum in Bakonya

- Flag Coat of arms

- Location of Bakonya Bakonya (Hungary)
- Coordinates: 46.08569°N 18.08382°E
- Country: Hungary
- County: Baranya
- District: Pécs

Area
  - Total: 15.07 km^{2} (5.82 sq mi)

Population (1 Jan 2019)
  - Total: 336
  - Density: 22.3/km^{2} (57.7/sq mi)
- Time zone: UTC+1 (CET)
  - Summer (DST): UTC+2 (CEST)
- Postal code: 7675
- Area code: 72
- NUTS 3 code: HU231
- HCSO code: 08299
- Website: bakonya.hu

Bakonya is a village (Hungarian: község) in central Baranya County, Pécs District, in southern Hungary. It is located in the western Mecsek mountain range and was the site of a uranium mine from the 1950s to 1989. Its population at the 2011 Census was 335.

== Etymology ==
The name comes from the Slavic bukovina: beech forest.

== Geography ==
The village is located at 46° 5′ 12″ N, 18° 4′ 51″ E. Its area is 15.07 km^{2} (5.82 sq mi). It is part of the Southern Transdanubia statistical region, and administratively it falls under Pécs District of Baranya County.

It lies 11.9 km (7.4 mi) west of the city of Pécs and is bordered by the villages of Hetvehely to the north, Kővágótöttös to the east, Bicsérd to the south, and Boda to the west.

Bakonya is located in the western Mecsek Mountains, and the northern half of the village area lies within the Western Mecsek Landscape Protection District, managed by the Danube-Dráva National Park.

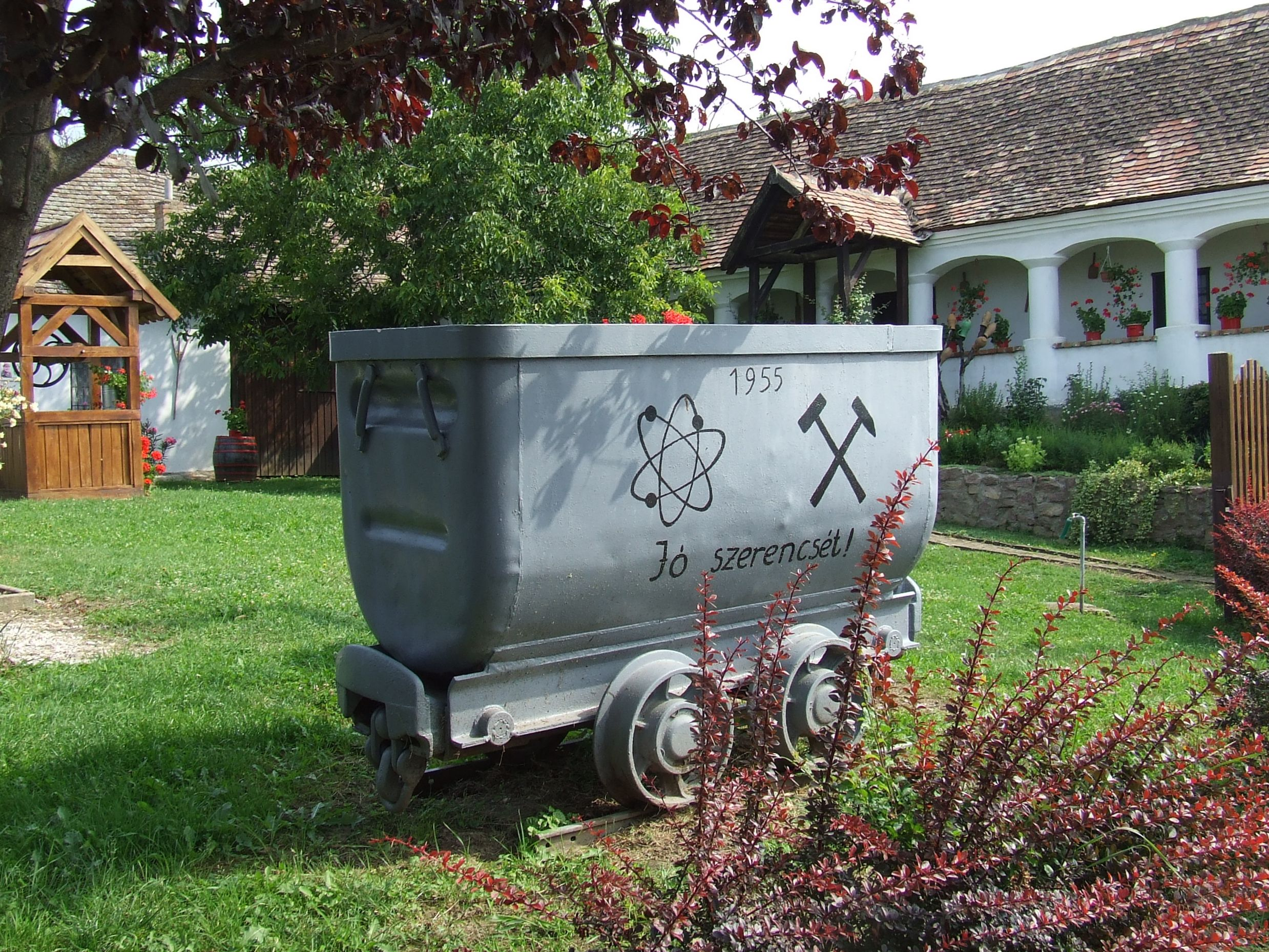
Uranium mining monument in Bakonya.

The area is rich in minerals compared to other parts of Hungary, and uranium ore was discovered in sandstone deposits near Bakonya, with production beginning in the mid-1950s. The uranium was of low grade, but production was subsidized by the government until 1989, when the mine closed following the collapse of the Soviet Union, the primary consumer of the ore, rendering the operation no longer economically viable.

== Demographics ==
Historical population
Year	Pop.	±%
1870	618	—
1880	565	−8.6%
1890	585	+3.5%
1900	546	−6.7%
1910	571	+4.6%
1920	548	−4.0%
1930	552	+0.7%
1941	594	+7.6%
1949	598	+0.7%
1960	553	−7.5%
1970	500	−9.6%
1980	453	−9.4%
1990	363	−19.9%
2001	416	+14.6%
2011	335	−19.5%
2019	336	+0.3%
Source: Hungarian Central Statistical Office

=== 2011 census ===
As of the census of 2011, there were 335 residents, 136 households, and 93 families living in the village. The population density was 58 inhabitants per square mile (22/km^{2}). There were 140 dwellings at an average density of 24 per square mile (9/km^{2}).

There were 136 households, of which 64.0% were one-family households, 2.2% were multi-family households, 30.1% were one-person households, and 3.7% were other non-family households. The average household size was 2.46.

There were 93 families, of which 40.9% were couples living with children, 39.8% were couples living without children, 12.9% were single females with children, and 6.5% were single males with children. The average number of children was 1.13. The average family size was 2.94.

The age breakdown of the village was 21.2% under the age of 20, 7.8% between ages 20 and 24, 25.4% aged 25 to 44, 31.0% aged 45 to 64, and 14.6% aged 65 and older. The gender ratio was 1.06 males to every female.

In terms of educational attainment, 92.6% completed at least primary school, 26.9% completed at least secondary school with final examination, and 5.0% had a higher education degree.

Religious affiliation was 49.9% Roman Catholic, 1.2% Calvinist, 0.9% Lutheran, 0.3% Greek Catholic, 1.2% other religion, and 26% unaffiliated, with 20.6% declining to answer.

The village had an ethnic minority Roma population of 15.2%. The other minority nationality affiliation of note was German (2.1%), with small numbers of Poles, Croats, and others, non-native to Hungary, each constituting less than 1% of the population. The vast majority declared themselves as Hungarian (94.9%), with 3.9% declining to answer. (Note: As a person can affiliate themselves with more than one ethnic group (nationality), the totals may be greater than 100%.)

== Local government ==
The village is governed by a mayor with a four-person council. The local government of the village operates a joint council office with the nearby localities of Cserkút and Kővágószőlős. The seat of the joint council is in Kővágószőlős.

As of the election of 2019, the village also has a local minority self-government for its Roma community, with three elected representatives.

=== Mayors since 1990 ===
Mayor	Party	Term(s) of Office
Janz Anikó	Independent	2019-
István Varga	Independent	2014-2019
István Varga	Independent	2010-2014
István Varga	Independent	2006-2010
István Varga	Independent	2002-2006
István Varga	Independent	1998-2002
András Vakaró	Independent	1994-1998
András Vakaró	Independent	1990-1994

== Transportation ==
=== Railway ===
- Bicsérd Train Station, 7 km (4.3 mi) to the south of the village off Road 6601. The station is on the Pusztaszabolcs–Pécs and Gyékényes–Pécs railway lines and is operated by MÁV.

=== Road ===
- Road 6605, which passes through the Mecsek mountain range, connects to Main Road 6 in the south and Hetvehely at Road 6601 in the north.
- Main Road 6, which runs south of the village, connects east-west to Szentlőrinc and Pécs.
