= Lake Pécs =

- Pécsi-tó, Orfűi nagy-tó, Big Orfü Lake
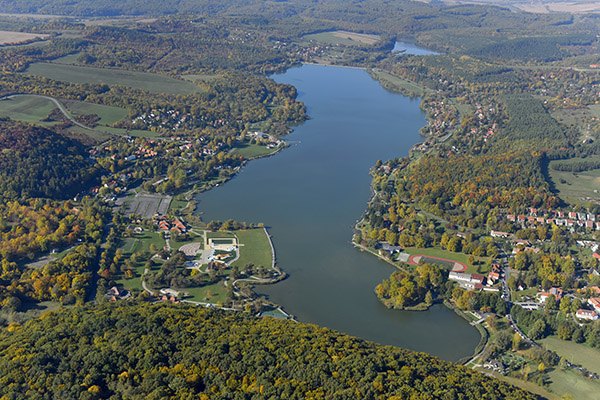
- A drone view of Pécs lake

- Location within Hungary
- Location: Baranya County, Hungary
- Coordinates: 46°09′24″N 18°08′13″E
- Type: Freshwater lake

Lake Pécs (Hungarian: Pécsi-tó) is a lake in Hungary. The lake is located north of the village of Orfű, in Baranya county; surrounding villages are Mecsekrákos and Tekeres. It is within the Mecsek mountain range, which separates the lake from the city of Pécs to the south. There are 4 lakes (Pécs, Orfű, Herman Ottó, Kovácsszénája) at Orfű next to each other. The lake is used for angling, bathing and boating. There is also a Mill Museum, where millers mill wheat and sell homemade bread.

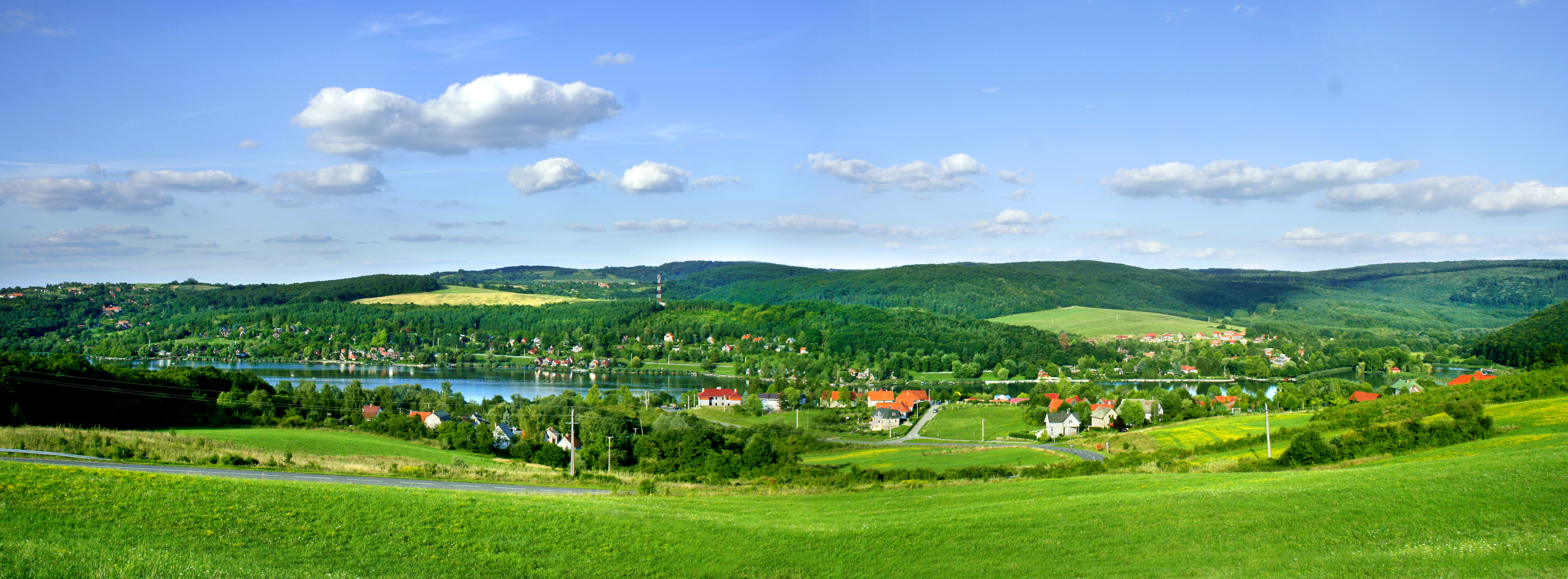
A panoramic view of Lake Pécs
