= Buses in Pécs =

Bus services in Pécs, Hungary

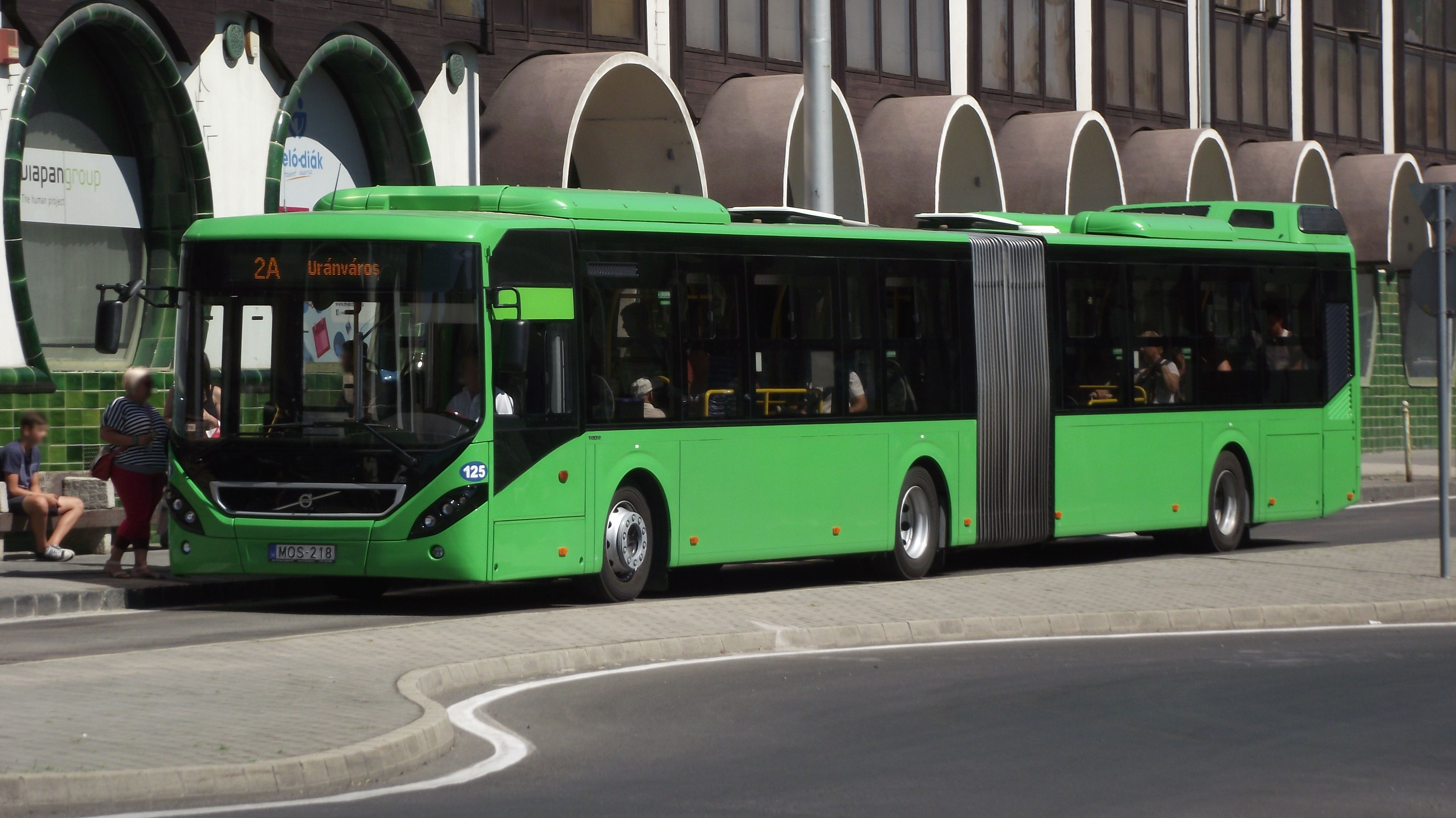
Volvo 7900 type bus in Pécs

Buses in Pécs, Hungary are the primary form of public transport in the city. Services are operated by two companies, Tükebusz Zrt (from February 2012) and PK Zrt (Pécsi Közlekedési Zrt). Unlike the transport companies of many other cities, Tükebusz Zrt. is independent from the company responsible for municipal transport in the county (Pannon Volán) and is responsible only for the mass transportation in Pécs.

== History ==
On 19 August 1926, 2 Renault-bus started the bus service in Pécs. First between Széchenyi tér and the cemetery. With the mining in Pécs there started to operate buses between the city center and the mines. In the 1930s, the buses started to be popular, new lines started to operate to Mecsek. After the 2nd World War from Budapest and from nationalized private companies Pécs got new buses, and in 1948–49 new lines started to operate to Kokszmű, Bálics, Nagymeszes, Postvölgy, Nagyárpád, Szabolcsfalu, Tettye, Donátus, Vasas, Pellérd, all from Széchenyi Square. In 1958 there were 58 buses.

In 1960, the tram lines have been closed, the lines got numbers and they were reconstructed. Széchenyi square was not big enough for all of the lines and buses, some started from Kossuth square and from Újmecsekalja. In 1964 the company had 109 buses after it merged to the county's company, most of them Škoda (Karosa ŠM) or Ikarus 30, 620, 630, 66.

The city had grown very fast, in Újmecsekalja, Meszes and Kertváros there were built thousands of new flats.

In 1976, Pécs had the first Ikarus 260 and 280 types and until 1983 they discarded all old types and had only Ik-260s and Ik-280s. In 1979 the Nevelési Központ station opened in Megyer, at this time buses started from Újmecsekalja, Főpályaudvar, Budai állomás, Kossuth tér, Kertváros and Nevelési Központ. In 1986 they closed the Kossuth tér station.

In 1987 the numbering changed:

- 1–7: main lines
- 10–15: buses from Budai Állomás (East-Pécs)
- 20–27: buses from Újmecsekalja (West-Pécs)
- 30–43: buses from Főpályaudvar (train station, city center)
- 50: bus from Kertváros (South-Pécs)
- 60–62: buses from Nevelési Központ (South-Pécs)
- 80–88: mining buses
- 101–107: express lines

This system is still available with some minor changes.

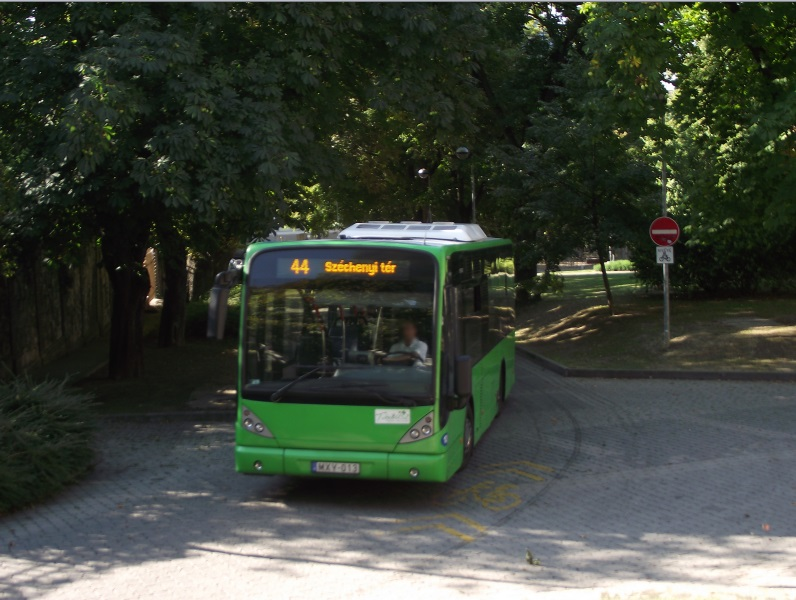
Van-Hool on Line 44

In 1988 there was the peak in the number of buses (181) and the number of passengers. In 1993 Pécsi Közlekedési Rt. was founded and separated from Pannon Volán. In 1995 Pécs had new Ikarus Bus 415 and 435 buses, and from 1999 Mercedes-Benz Citaro and Mercedes-Benz Conecto types.

In 2003 the name changed to Pécsi Közlekedési Rt and from the old white-blue colours they changed to yellow-blue which are the colours of the city. Now they have 167 buses (75 Ikarus and 88 Mercedes). In 2009 PK Zrt sold all of their buses for 2.2 billion Forints and started to rent them for 2.1 billion Forints annually. In 2012 the court gave back the buses to PK Zrt because of misappropriation.

PK Zrt had approximately 800 million Forints debt in 2012, it bankrupted, and the city started a new transport company named Tükebusz Zrt. They rent the buses from PK Zrt.

== Bus services ==
=== Daytime ===
1: Uránváros – Csontváry utca – Uránváros
2: Uránváros – Árkád (shopping center) – Mecsekszabolcs
2A: Uránváros – Árkád (shopping center) – Fehérhegy
3: Kertváros – Főpályaudvar (railway station) – Árkád (shopping center) – Autóbusz-állomás (bus station) – Kertváros
3E: Kertváros - Főpályaudvar
4: Uránváros – Árkád (shopping center) – Hősök tere
4: Uránváros – Árkád (shopping center) – Hősök tere - Árpádtető
4: Uránváros – Árkád (shopping center) – Hősök tere - Gesztenyés
4Y: Uránváros – Árkád (shopping center) – Újhegy
6: Fagyöngy utca – Főpályaudvar (railway station) – Árkád (shopping center) – Autóbusz-állomás (bus station) – Kertváros
7: Főpályaudvar - Malomvölgyi út
7Y: Főpályaudvar - Málom - Malomvölgyi út
8: Kertváros - Főpályaudvar (railway station) - Árkád (shopping center) - Autóbusz-állomás (bus station) - Fagyöngy utca
12: Budai állomás – István-akna
13: Főpályaudvar (railway station) – Árkád (shopping center) – Hird, Harangláb utca
13E: Főpályaudvar - Hird, Harangláb utca
13Y: Főpályaudvar - Somogy - Hird, Harangláb utca
14: Főpályaudvar (railway station) – Árkád (shopping center) – Petőfi-akna
14Y: Főpályaudvar - Somogy - Petőfi-akna
15: Főpályaudvar (railway station) – Árkád (shopping center) – István-akna
16: Budai állomás – Finn utca
20: Főpályaudvar - Finn utca - Alexandra - Francia utca - Hőerőmű
21: Uránváros - Árkád (shopping center) - Finn utca - Hőerőmű - Baromfifeldolgozó
22: Fagyöngy utca – Árkád (shopping center) – Nagydeindol
23: Fagyöngy utca – Árkád (shopping center) – Deindol
23Y: Fagyöngy utca - Árkád (shopping center) - Deindol - Nagydeindol
24: Fagyöngy utca – Árkád (shopping center) – Mecsekszentkút
25: Budai állomás – Patacs, Benczúr Gyula utca
25A: Uránváros – Tettye Forrásház
26: Budai állomás – II-es rakodó
27: Patacs, Benczúr Gyula utca – Árkád (shopping center) – Gesztenyés
27Y: II-es rakodó - Patacs, Benczúr Gyula utca - Árkád (shopping center) - Gesztenyés
28: II-es rakodó – Árkád (shopping center) – Lámpásvölgy
28A: Uránváros - Árkád (shopping center) - Lámpásvölgy
28Y: Uránváros - Árkád (shopping center) - András utca - Lámpásvölgy
29: II-es rakodó - Árkád (shopping center) - Gyükés
30: Főpályaudvar (railway station) – Klinikák (Clinics)
30Y: Kertváros - Főpályaudvar (railway station) - Árkád (shopping center) - Klinikák (Clinics)
31: Főpályaudvar (railway station) - MTA-Székház - Tettye, Havihegyi út
32: Főpályaudvar (railway station) – MTA-Székház – Főpályaudvar (railway station)
32Y: Főpályaudvar (railway station) - MTA-Székház - Tettye, Havihegyi út
33: Főpályaudvar (railway station) – Árkád (shopping center) – Tettye, Havihegyi út
34: Főpályaudvar (railway station) – Dömörkapu
34Y: Főpályaudvar (railway station) - MTA-Székház - Szanatórium - Dömörkapu
35: Főpályaudvar (railway station) – Misinatető
35Y: Főpályaudvar (railway station) - MTA-Székház - Misinatető
36: Főpályaudvar (railway station) – Bálicstető
37: Főpályaudvar (railway station) – Donátus
38: Főpályaudvar (railway station) – Árkád (shopping center) – Lámpásvölgy
38Y: Főpályaudvar (railway station) - Árkád (shopping center) - András utca - Lámpásvölgy
39: Főpályaudvar (railway station) – Árkád (shopping center) – Gyükés
40: Főpályaudvar (railway station) – Árkád (shopping center) – Gesztenyés
41: Főpályaudvar (railway station) – Reménypuszta, Rovitex
41Y: Főpályaudvar (railway station) - Nagyárpád - Reménypuszta, Rovitex
41E: Reménypuszta, Rovitex - Főpályaudvar (railway station)
42: Főpályaudvar (railway station) – Nagyárpád
42Y: Főpályaudvar (railway station) - Nagyárpád - Főpályaudvar (railway station)
43: Főpályaudvar (railway station) - Nagyárpád - Reménypuszta, Rovitex
46: Főpályaudvar (railway station) - Bálicstető - Donátus - Főpályaudvar (railway station)
47: Főpályaudvar (railway station) - Donátus - Bálicstető - Főpályaudvar (railway station)
51: Fagyöngy utca - Déri Miksa utca - Fagyöngy utca
52: Fagyöngy utca - Időjós út
55: Klinikák (Clinics) - Csontváry utca - Klinikák (Clinics)
60: Budai állomás – Csontváry utca – Budai állomás - Mecsekszabolcs
60A: Budai állomás – Csontváry utca – Budai állomás
61: Kertváros - Malomvölgyi út
62: Kertváros - Fagyöngy utca
73: Főpályaudvar (railway station) – Árkád (shopping center) – Autóbusz-állomás (bus station) – Fagyöngy utca – Malomvölgyi út
73Y: Főpályaudvar (railway station) – Árkád (shopping center) – Autóbusz-állomás (bus station) – Fagyöngy utca – Málom – Malomvölgyi út – Főpályaudvar (railway station)
82: István-akna - Petőfi-akna
102: Uránváros - Árkád (shopping center) - Budai állomás - Petőfi-akna
102Y: Uránváros - Árkád (shopping center) - Budai állomás - Somogy - Petőfi-akna
103: Kertváros - Árkád (shopping center) - Klinikák (Clinics)
104: Uránváros - Árkád (shopping center) - Budai állomás - Petőfi-akna
104A: Uránváros - Árkád (shopping center) - Budai állomás - Hird, Harangláb utca
104E: Uránváros - Árkád (shopping center) - Budai állomás - Hird, Harangláb utca
109E: Fagyöngy utca - Árkád (shopping center) - Klinikák (Clinics)
121: Uránváros - Árkád (shopping center) - Finn utca - Alexandra - Francia utca - Hőerőmű - Baromfifeldolgozó - Kertváros
140: Főpályaudvar (railway station) - Bártfa utca - Gesztenyés
142: Nagyárpád - Fagyöngy utca

=== Night ===
2: Uránváros – Árkád – Fehérhegy – Hősök tere - Mecsekszabolcs
913: Főpályaudvar (railway station) – Újhegy – Somogy – Vasas – Hirdi elágazás
926: Uránváros – Korsó utca – Deindol – Uránváros
932: Főpályaudvar (railway station) – Pálosok – Donátus – MTA-székház – Főpályaudvar (railway station)
940: Főpályaudvar (railway station) – Szamárkút – Ledina – Kórház
941: Malomvölgyi út – Árpádváros – Malomvölgyi út
973: Főpályaudvar (railway station) – Fagyöngy utca – Malomvölgyi út
