= Tubes (peak) =

Mountain in Hungary

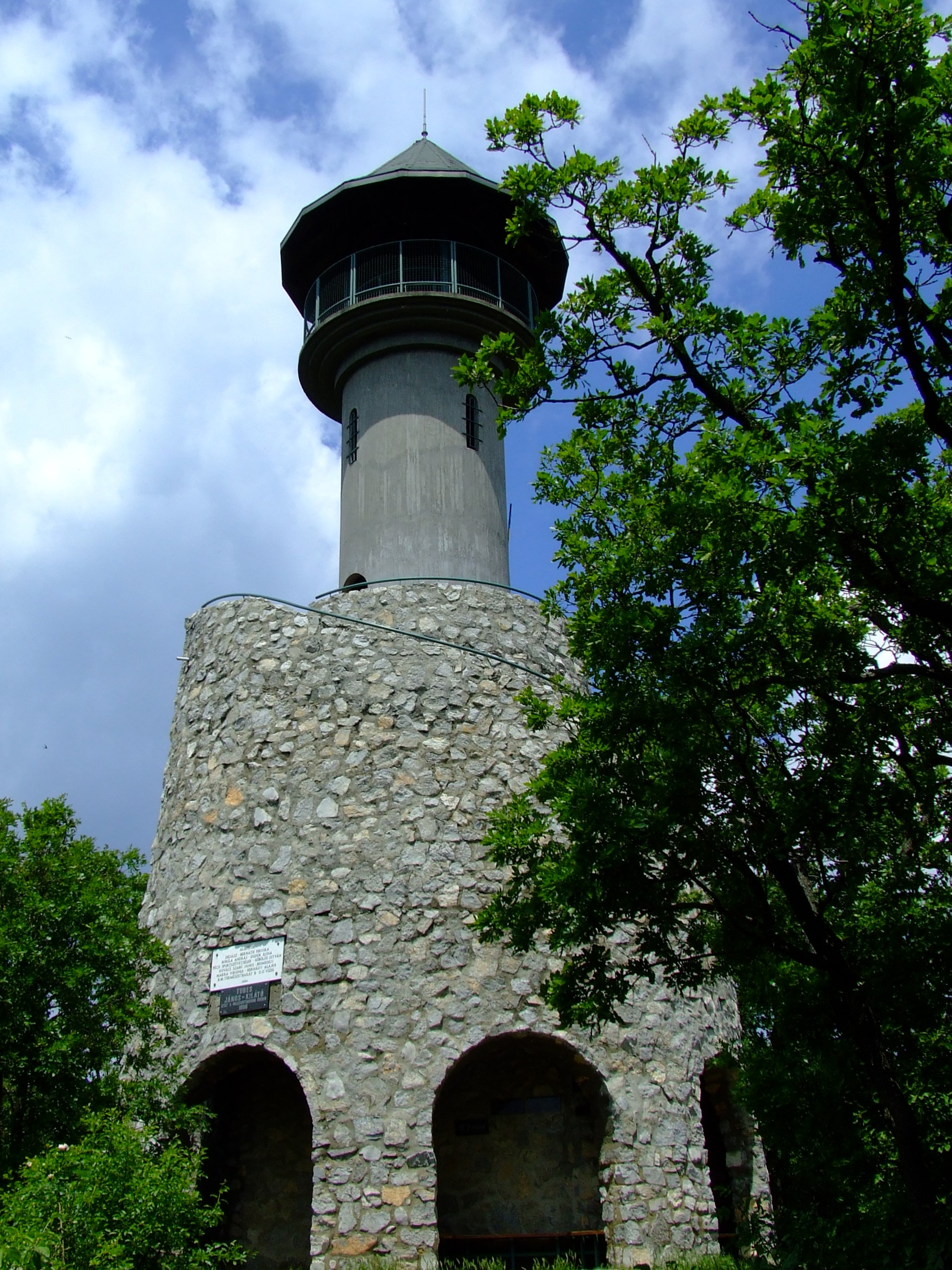

Highest point
- Elevation: 611 m (2,005 ft)
- Coordinates: 46°6′31″N 18°12′9″E

Naming
- Language of name: Hungarian

Geography
- Location within Hungary
- Location: Baranya County, Hungary
- Parent range: Mecsek, Transdanubia

Tubes is the second-highest peak of the Mecsek mountain range in Hungary. Its elevation is 611 metres (2005 ft) above sea level. The peak's name probably derives from "tuba", a Hungarian word for wild dove.

The peak is the site of a military radar station and a look-out tower. The 22 metre-high tower was completed in 2001 and provides a clear view in every direction. In 2005, the Hungarian government chose Tubes as the site for a 3D NATO military radar, however, due to civil resistance, the project was deployed in Tolna county.
