= Óbánya =

- Village
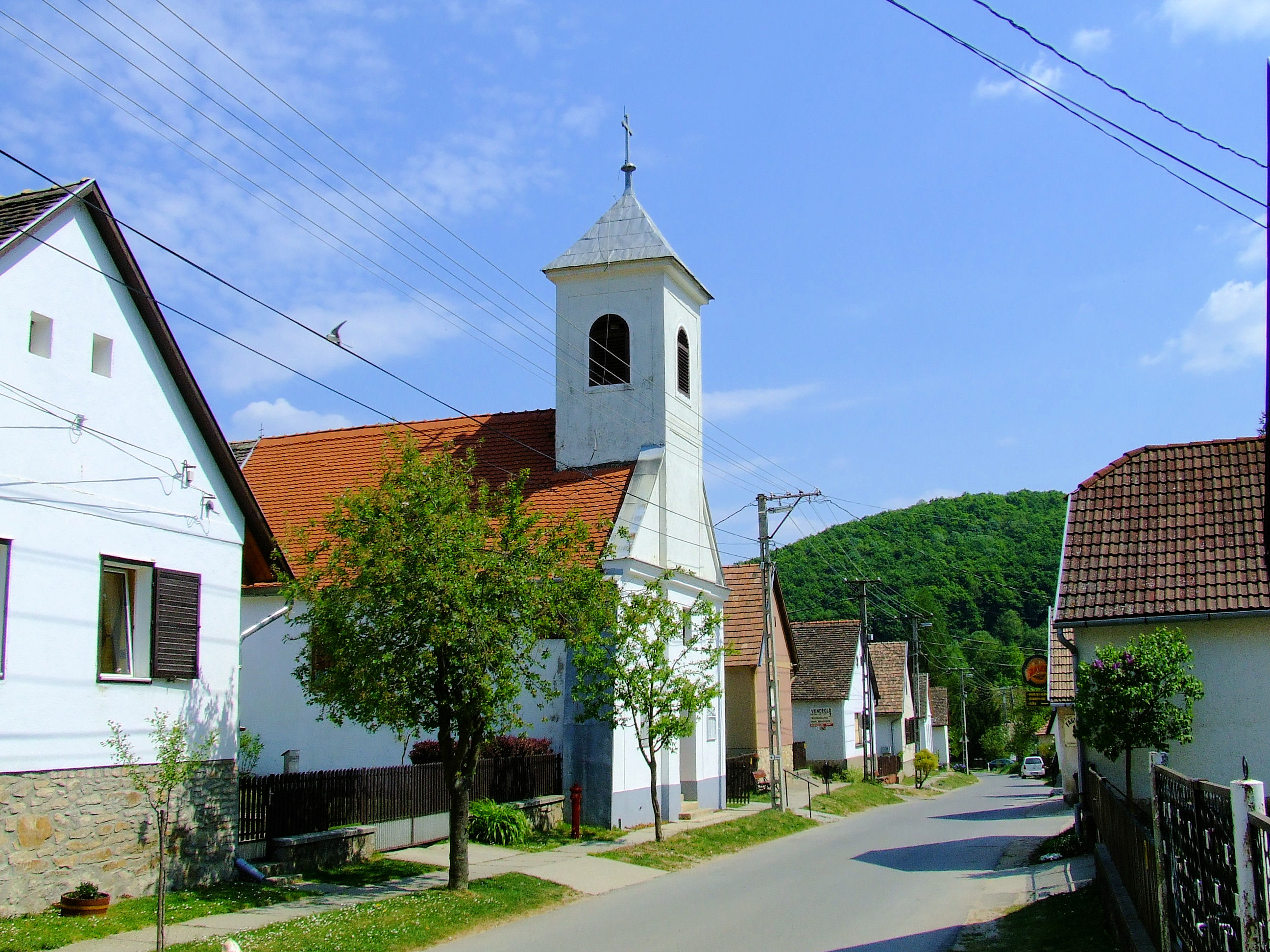
- A church in Óbánya.

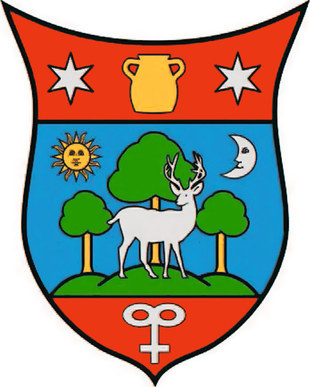
- Coat of arms

- Location of Óbánya in Hungary.
- Coordinates: 46°13′N 18°25′E
- Country: Hungary
- County: Baranya

Government
  - Mayor: Irén Van Groeningen (Ind.)

Area
  - Total: 7.49 km^{2} (2.89 sq mi)

Population (2022)
  - Total: 100
  - Density: 13/km^{2} (35/sq mi)
- Time zone: UTC+1 (CET)
  - Summer (DST): UTC+2 (CEST)
- Postal code: 7695
- Area code: 72

Óbánya is a village in Baranya county, Hungary.

== Area ==
It has an area of 7.49 square kilometres.
