= Boda, Hungary =

Boda
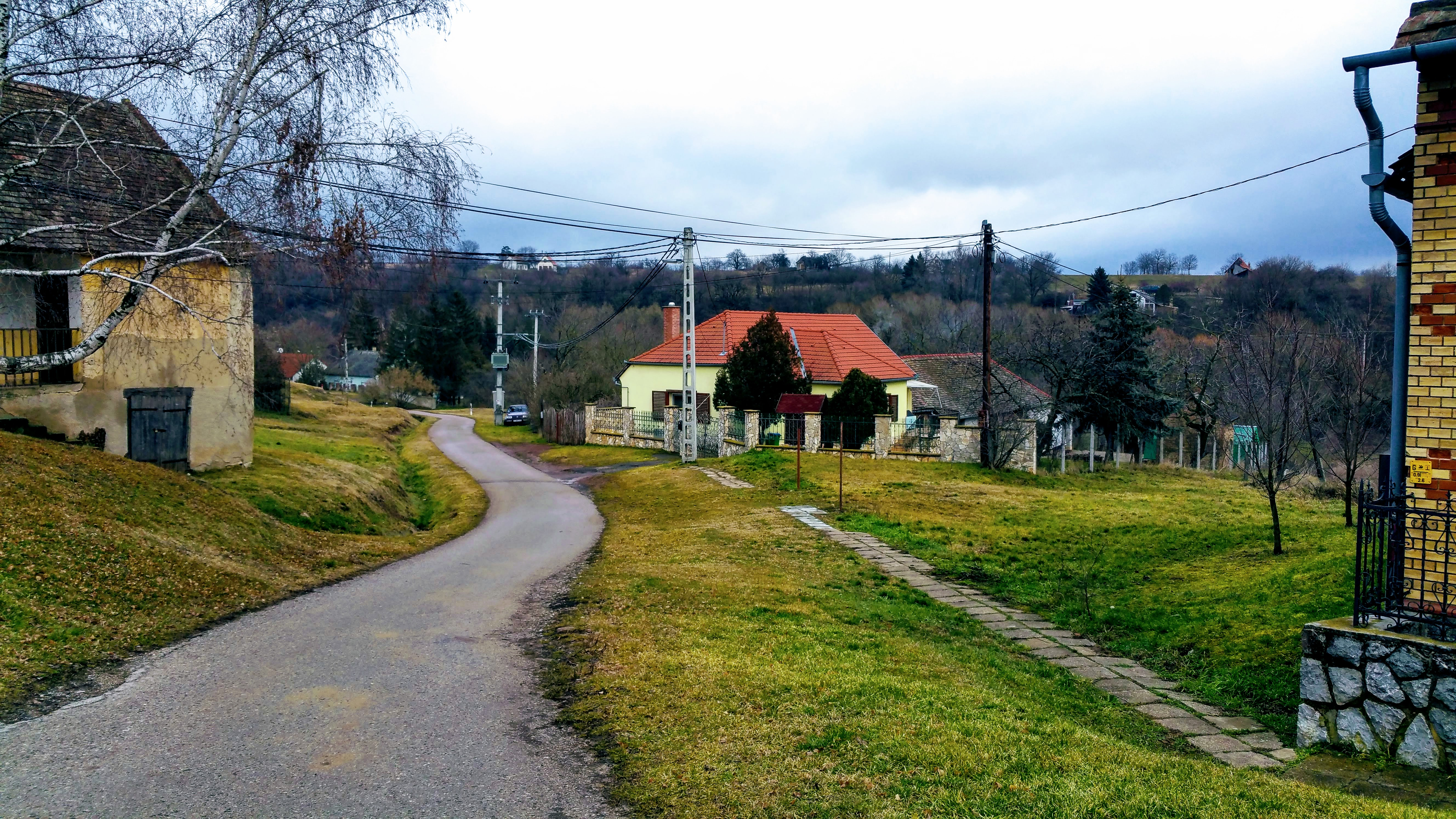

- Seal

- Location of Baranya county in Hungary

- Location of Boda, Hungary
- Coordinates: 46.08033°N 18.04952°E
- Country: Hungary
- County: Baranya

Area
  - Total: 15.42 km^{2} (5.95 sq mi)

Population (2004)
  - Total: 420
  - Density: 27.17/km^{2} (70.4/sq mi)
- Time zone: UTC+1 (CET)
  - Summer (DST): UTC+2 (CEST)
- Postal code: 7672
- Area code: 73

Boda is a village in Baranya county, southern Hungary.
