= Ellend =

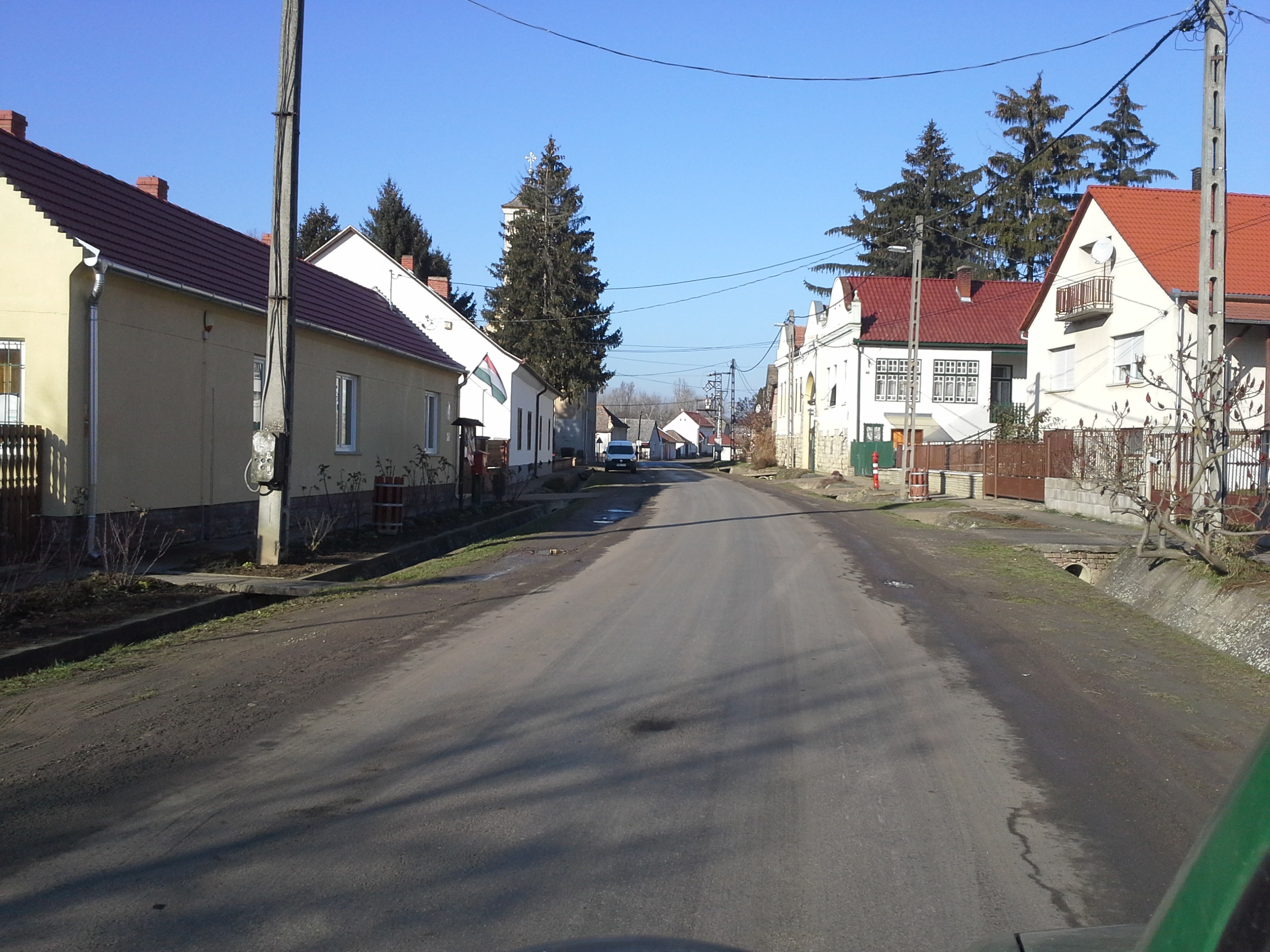

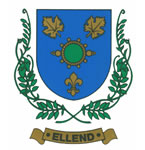
- Coat of arms

- Location of Baranya county in Hungary

- Location of Ellend
- Coordinates: 46.05825°N 18.37665°E
- Country: Hungary
- County: Baranya

Area
  - Total: 7.99 km^{2} (3.08 sq mi)

Population (2015)
  - Total: 185
  - Density: 23.2/km^{2} (60.0/sq mi)
- Time zone: UTC+1 (CET)
  - Summer (DST): UTC+2 (CEST)
- Postal code: 7744
- Area code: 72

Ellend (Croatian: Elen, Lenda) is a village in Baranya county, Hungary.
