= Szilágy (village) =

- Village (Falva)
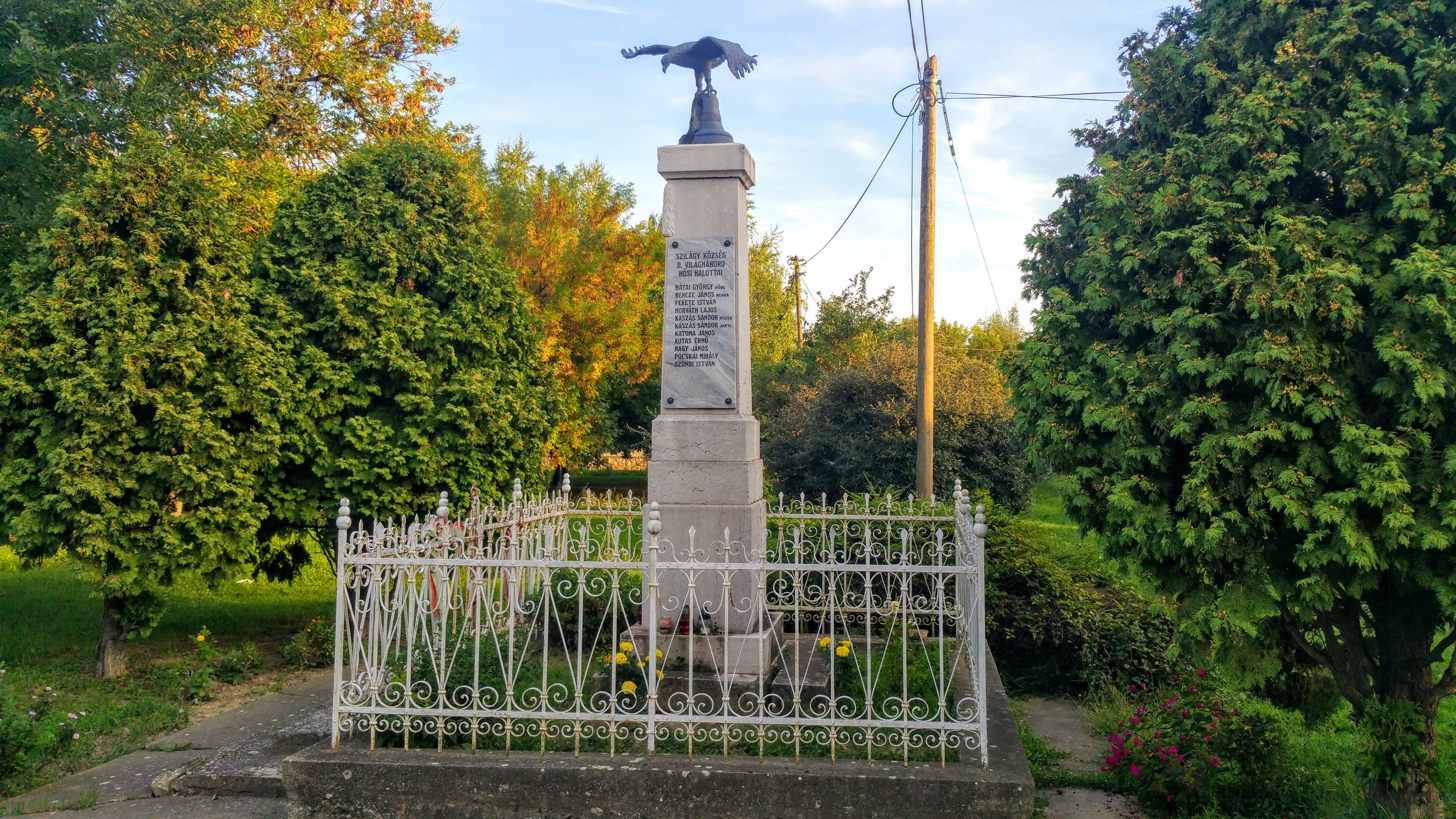
- A World War II memorial in Szilágy.

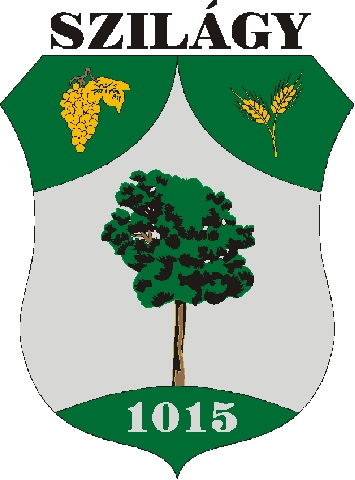
- Coat of arms

- Location within Hungary
- Coordinates: 46°06′06″N 18°24′23″E
- Country: Hungary
- Region: Southern Transdanubia
- County: Baranya

Government
  - Mayor: Romoda Sándor (Ind.)

Area
  - Total: 11.55 km^{2} (4.46 sq mi)

Population (2022)
  - Total: 270
  - Density: 23/km^{2} (61/sq mi)
- Time zone: UTC+1 (CET)
  - Summer (DST): UTC+2 (CEST)
- Postal code: 7664
- Area code: 72
- Website: www.szilagy.hu

Szilágy is a village in Baranya county, Hungary.
