= Romonya =

- Village (Falva)
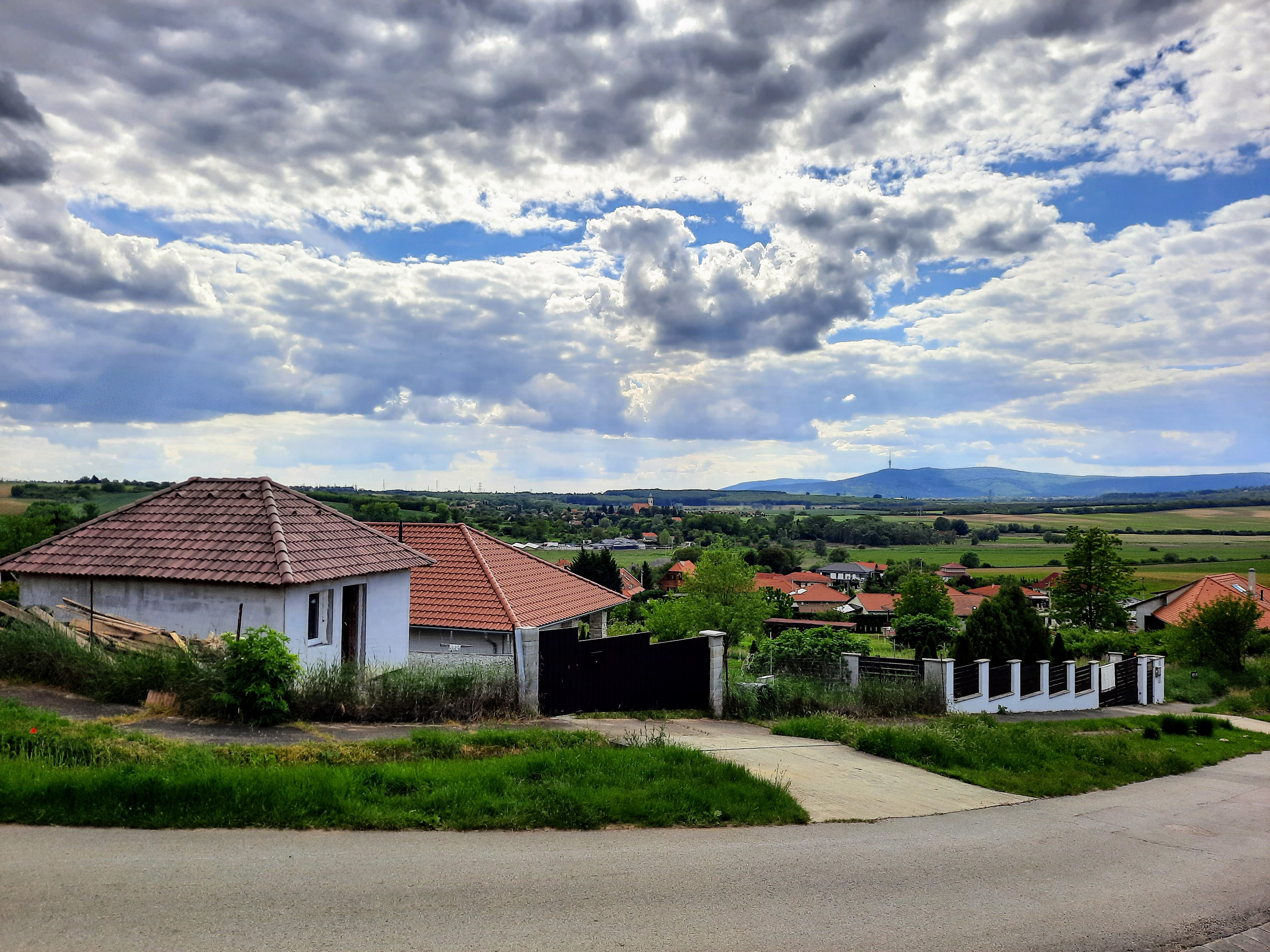

- Location of Baranya county in Hungary

- Location of Romonya
- Coordinates: 46.08681°N 18.33893°E
- Country: Hungary
- County: Baranya

Area
  - Total: 7.07 km^{2} (2.73 sq mi)

Population (2004)
  - Total: 427
  - Density: 60.39/km^{2} (156.4/sq mi)
- Time zone: UTC+1 (CET)
  - Summer (DST): UTC+2 (CEST)
- Postal code: 7743
- Area code: 72

Romonya (Croatian: Rumenja) is a village in Baranya county, Hungary.
