= Berkesd =

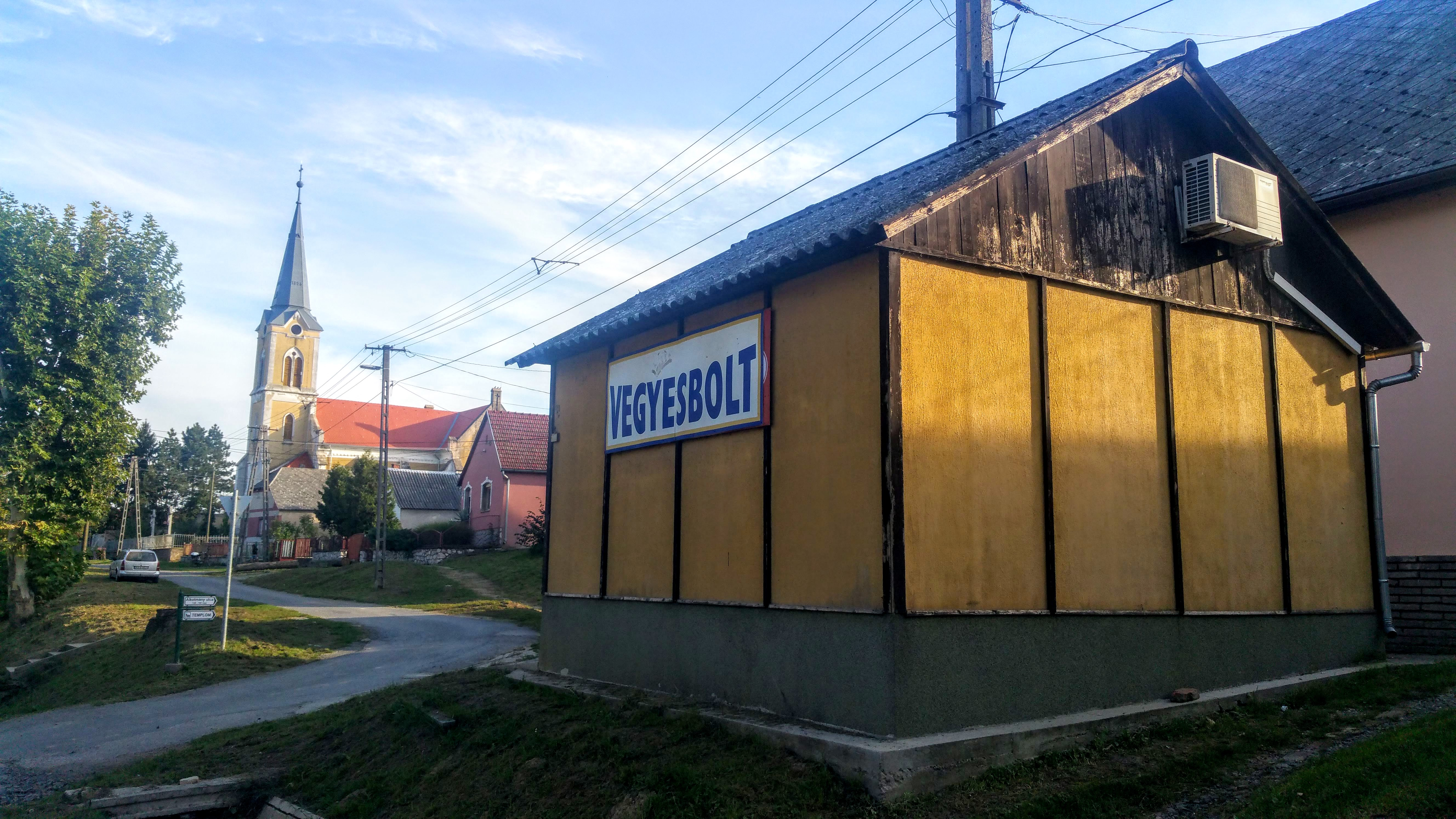

- Seal

- Location of Baranya county in Hungary

- Location of Berkesd
- Coordinates: 46.07531°N 18.40972°E
- Country: Hungary
- County: Baranya

Government
  - Mayor: Hermann-né Rattinger Mária Éva (Ind.)

Area
  - Total: 19.04 km^{2} (7.35 sq mi)

Population (2022)
  - Total: 776
  - Density: 40.8/km^{2} (106/sq mi)
- Time zone: UTC+1 (CET)
  - Summer (DST): UTC+2 (CEST)
- Postal code: 7664
- Area code: 72

Berkesd (Croatian: Berkuš) is a village in Baranya county, in southern Hungary.
