= Pereked =

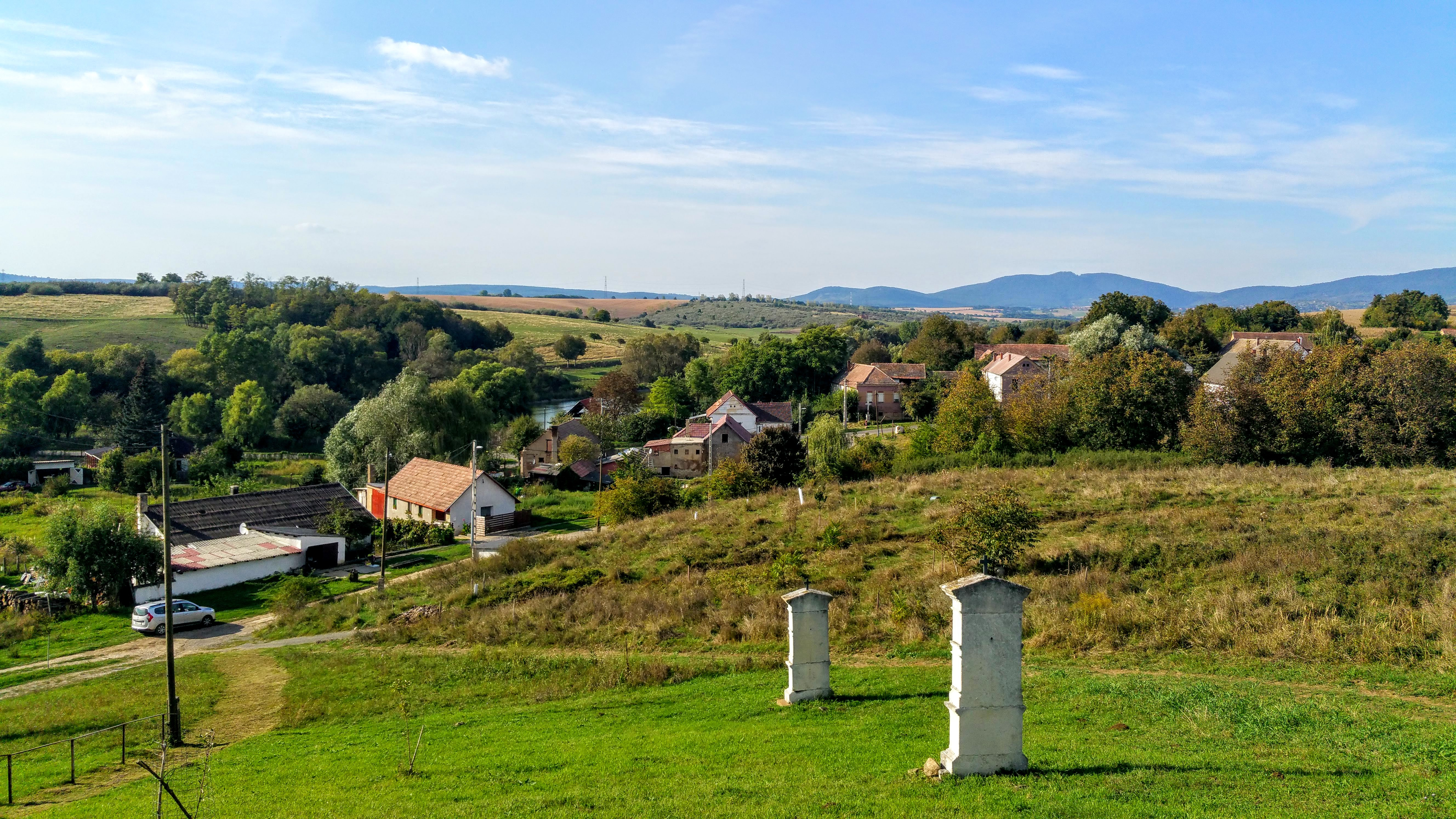

- Location of Baranya county in Hungary

- Location of Pereked
- Coordinates: 46.09293°N 18.37697°E
- Country: Hungary
- County: Baranya

Area
  - Total: 6.74 km^{2} (2.60 sq mi)

Population (2004)
  - Total: 186
  - Density: 27.59/km^{2} (71.5/sq mi)
- Time zone: UTC+1 (CET)
  - Summer (DST): UTC+2 (CEST)
- Postal code: 7664
- Area code: 72

Pereked (Croatian: Prekad) is a village in Baranya county, Hungary.
