= Orfű =

- Village
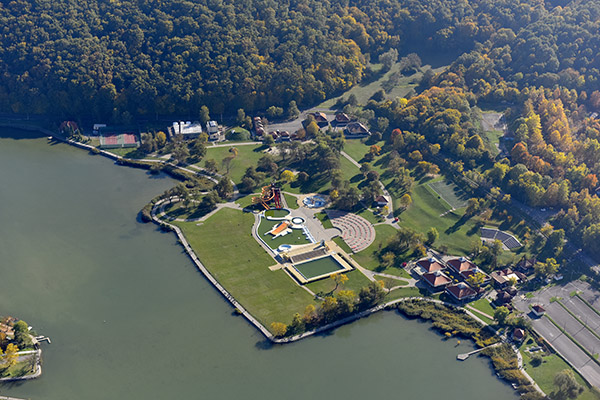
- The beach of Orfű - aerial photo

- Flag Coat of arms

- Location of Baranya county in Hungary

- Location of Orfű
- Coordinates: 46.13823°N 18.15542°E
- Country: Hungary
- County: Baranya

Area
  - Total: 32.15 km^{2} (12.41 sq mi)

Population (2004)
  - Total: 770
  - Density: 23.95/km^{2} (62.0/sq mi)
- Time zone: UTC+1 (CET)
  - Summer (DST): UTC+2 (CEST)
- Postal code: 7677
- Area code: 72

Orfű is a village in the Pécs District of Baranya county, Hungary. The settlement is a well-known pleasure resort, lying to the north-northwest of Pécs.

== Geography ==
Orfű lies 17km north-northwest of Pécs, in between the ridges of the Mecsek mountains of southern Hungary.

== History ==
The area in the Mecsek mountains has been inhabited since prehistoric times. Archeological remains testify to the existence of prehistoric forest-dwellers, who subsisted through hunting and gathering. The first coherent ethnic group to enter the area were the Illyrians, who dwelt here in the late Iron Age, and were followed by Celts. During Roman times, Orfű was in the province of Pannonia, and Roman roads were built which lay approximately where modern roads through the area lie.

Following the collapse of the Roman Empire during the Migration Period, many ethnic groups came through the area including Huns, Germans, Avars, Slavs, and eventually Hungarians. The village's name first appeared in writing in the beginning of the 14th century. Orfű and the surrounding villages in the Mecsek mountains flourished under Hungarian rule in the Middle Ages.

During the Ottoman occupation, the region around Orfű became severely depopulated. Many villages went extinct altogether, and their names only remain today attached to the occasional small vineyard.

In the beginning of the 18th century, there was a slow start to reconstruction. Large groups of industrious Germans began to settle the abandoned lands, arriving in many waves, but primarily from Swabia. By the 1930s, the town was 93% German, and 7% Hungarian. Following World War II, these Germans were deported en masse by Allied forces.

In the 1960s, construction began on a series of artificial lakes around the village. Since then, the village has increasingly become a resort town, providing the village with an influx of tourists, and significant economic opportunities.

== Demographics ==
As of the 2011 census, the Orfű population was 78.8% Hungarian, 3.6% German, and 1.6% Gypsy. The villagers were 45% Roman Catholic, 4.3% Reformed, 1.7% Lutheran, and 18.1% non-denominational.

== Gallery ==
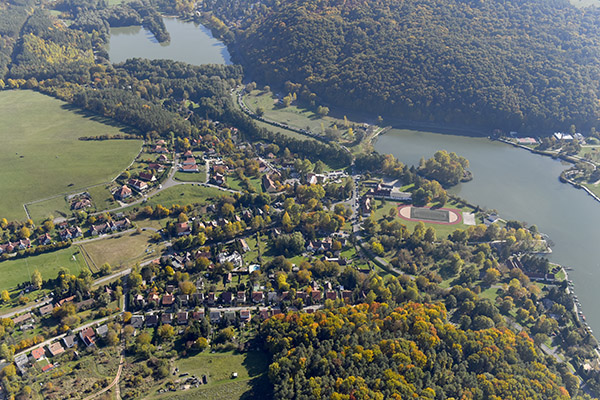
Aerial photography of Orfű

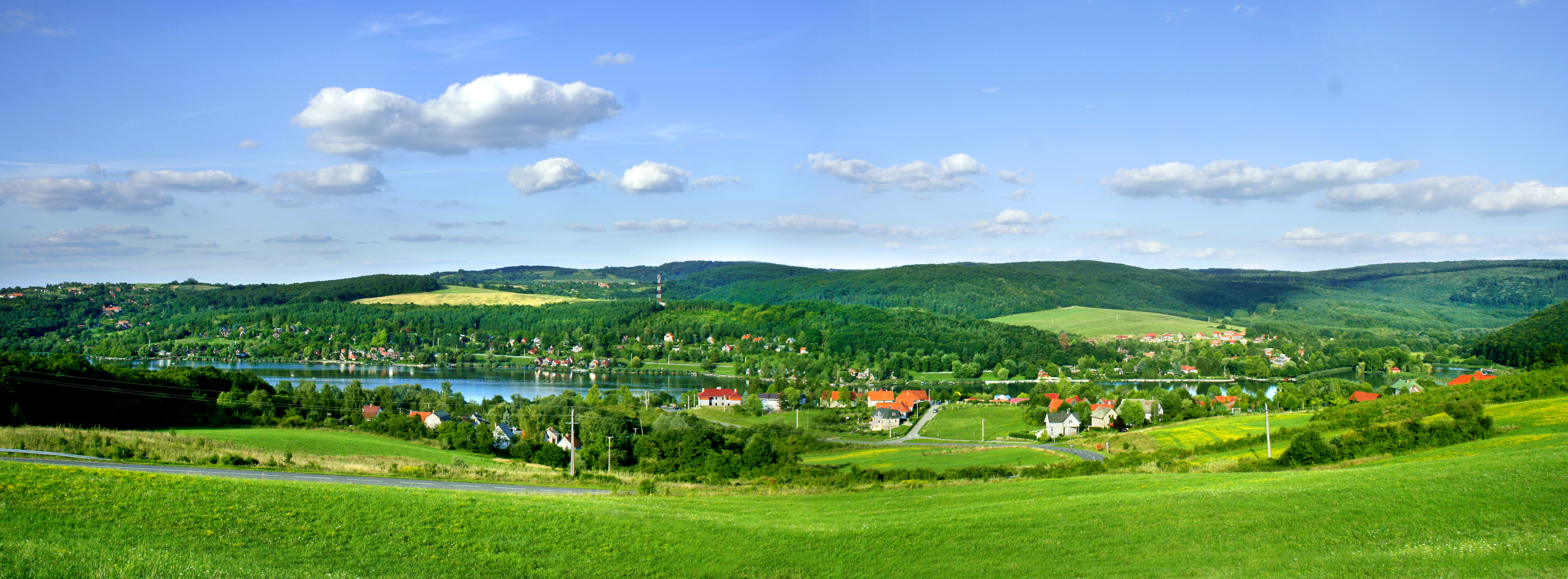
View of Orfű
