= Kovácsszénája =

- Village
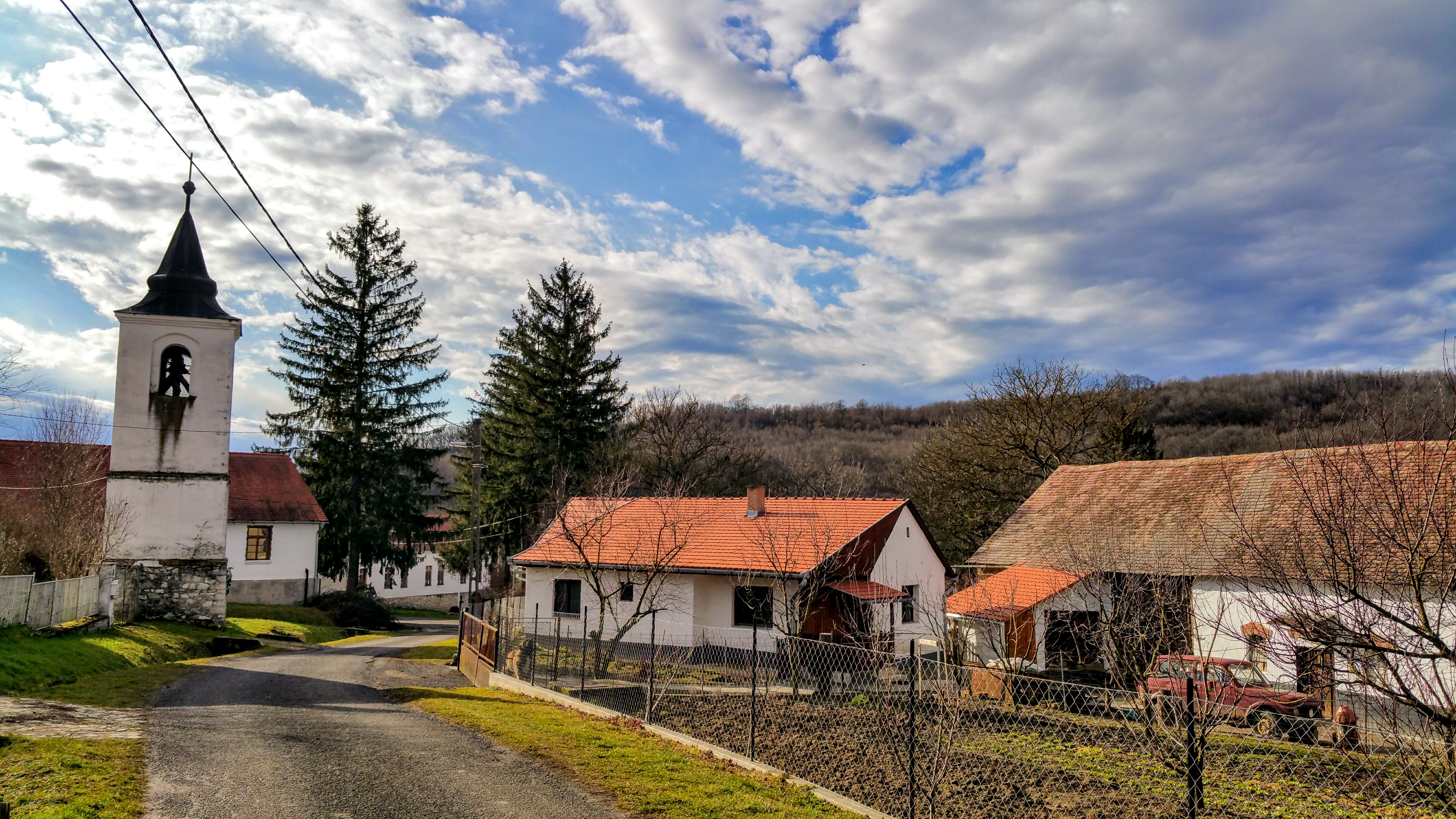

- Location in Hungary
- Coordinates: 46°10′19″N 18°06′33″E
- Country: Hungary
- County: Baranya

Population (2025)
  - Total: 65
- Time zone: UTC+1 (CET)
  - Summer (DST): UTC+2 (CEST)

Kovácsszénája is a village in Baranya county, Hungary.
