= Cserkút =

- Village
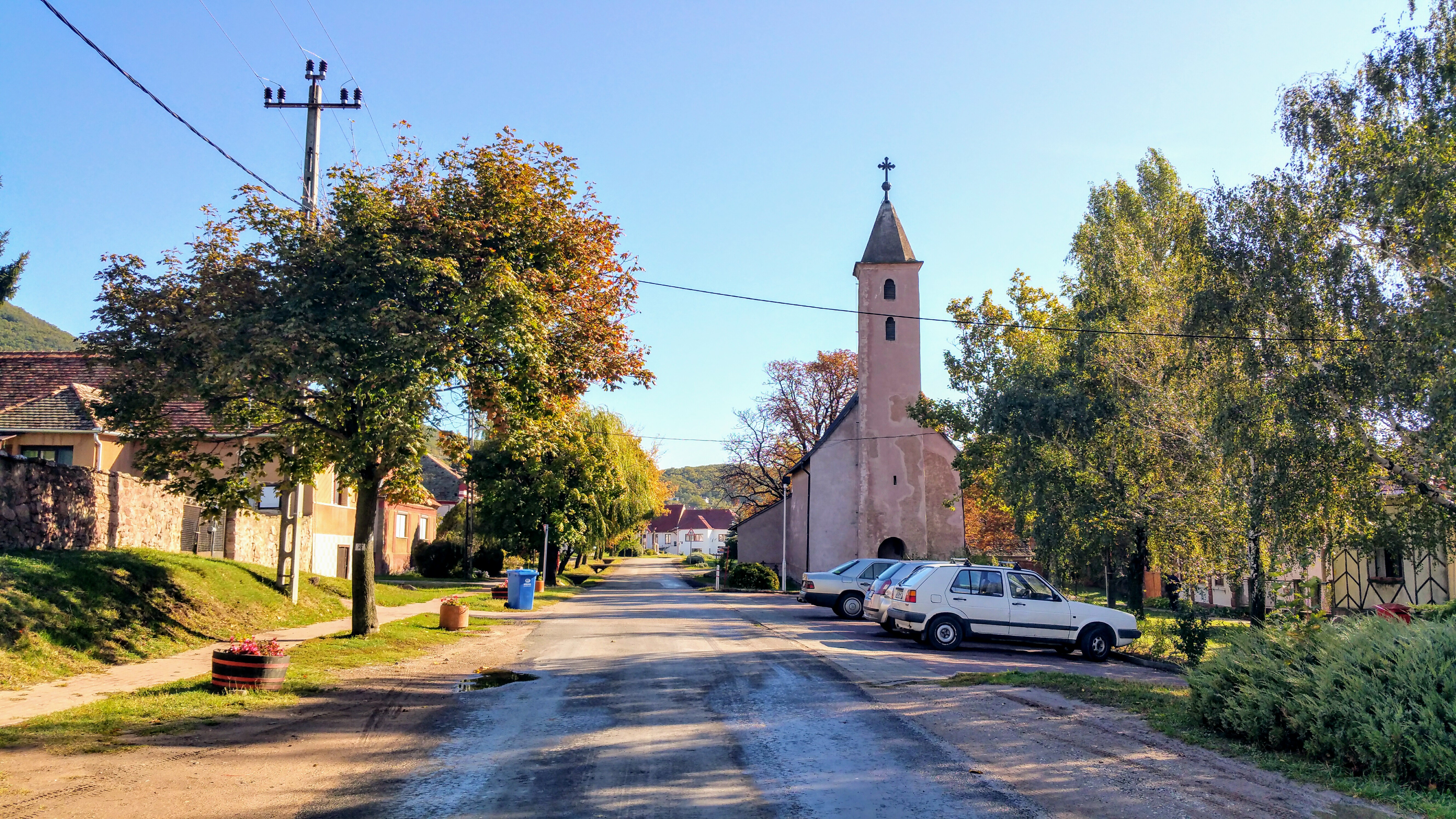
- Constitution Street with the Roman Catholic Church

- Flag Seal

- Location within Hungary
- Coordinates: 46°04′N 18°08′E
- Country: Hungary
- County: Baranya

Government
  - Mayor: Hegedűs Zsolt (Ind.)

Area
  - Total: 6.67 km^{2} (2.58 sq mi)

Population (2022)
  - Total: 559
  - Density: 83.8/km^{2} (217/sq mi)
- Time zone: UTC+1 (CET)
  - Summer (DST): UTC+2 (CEST)
- Postal code: 7673
- Area code: 72
- Website: www.cserkut.hu

Cserkút is a village in Baranya county, Hungary.
