= Kővágótöttös =

- Village
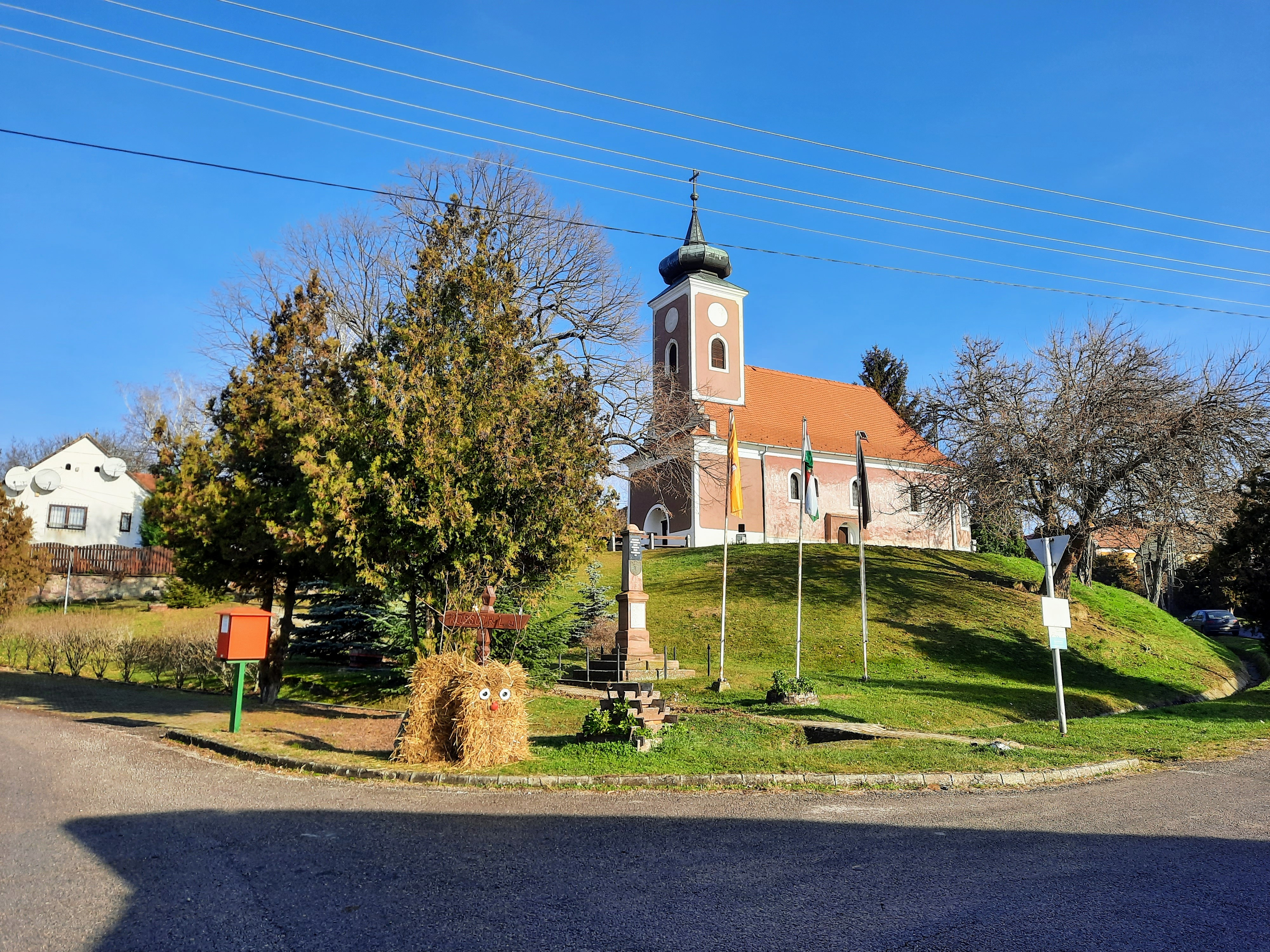
- Interactive map of Kővágótöttös
- Coordinates: 46°05′N 18°05′E
- Country: Hungary
- County: Baranya

Population (2025)
  - Total: 311
- Time zone: UTC+1 (CET)
  - Summer (DST): UTC+2 (CEST)

Kővágótöttös is a village in Baranya county, in southern Hungary.
