= Husztót =

- Village
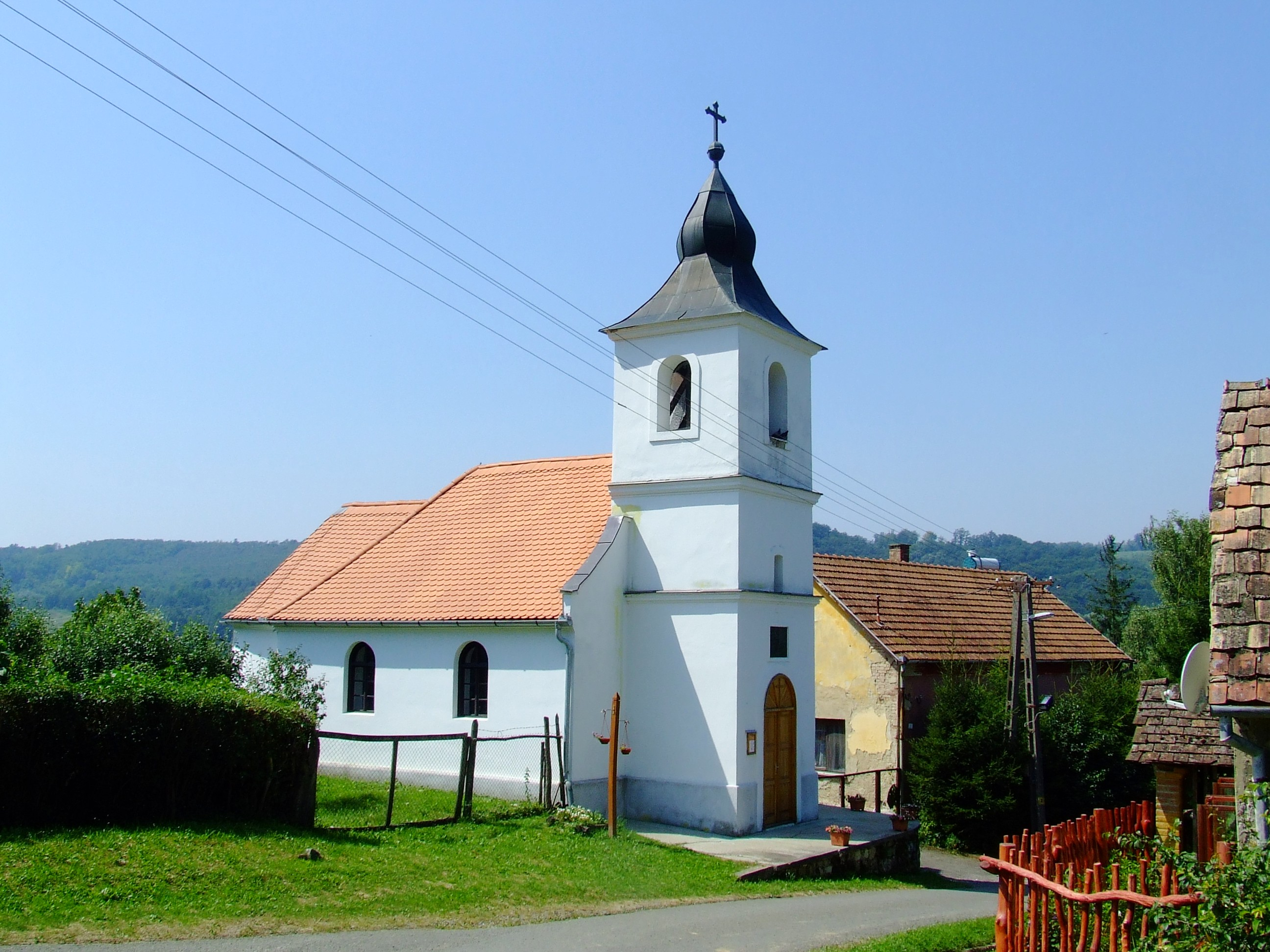
- Husztót Szent Teréz templom
- Interactive map of Husztót
- Coordinates: 46°10′N 18°05′E
- Country: Hungary
- County: Baranya
- Time zone: UTC+1 (CET)
  - Summer (DST): UTC+2 (CEST)

Husztót is a village in Baranya county, Hungary.
