= Kővágószőlős =

- Village
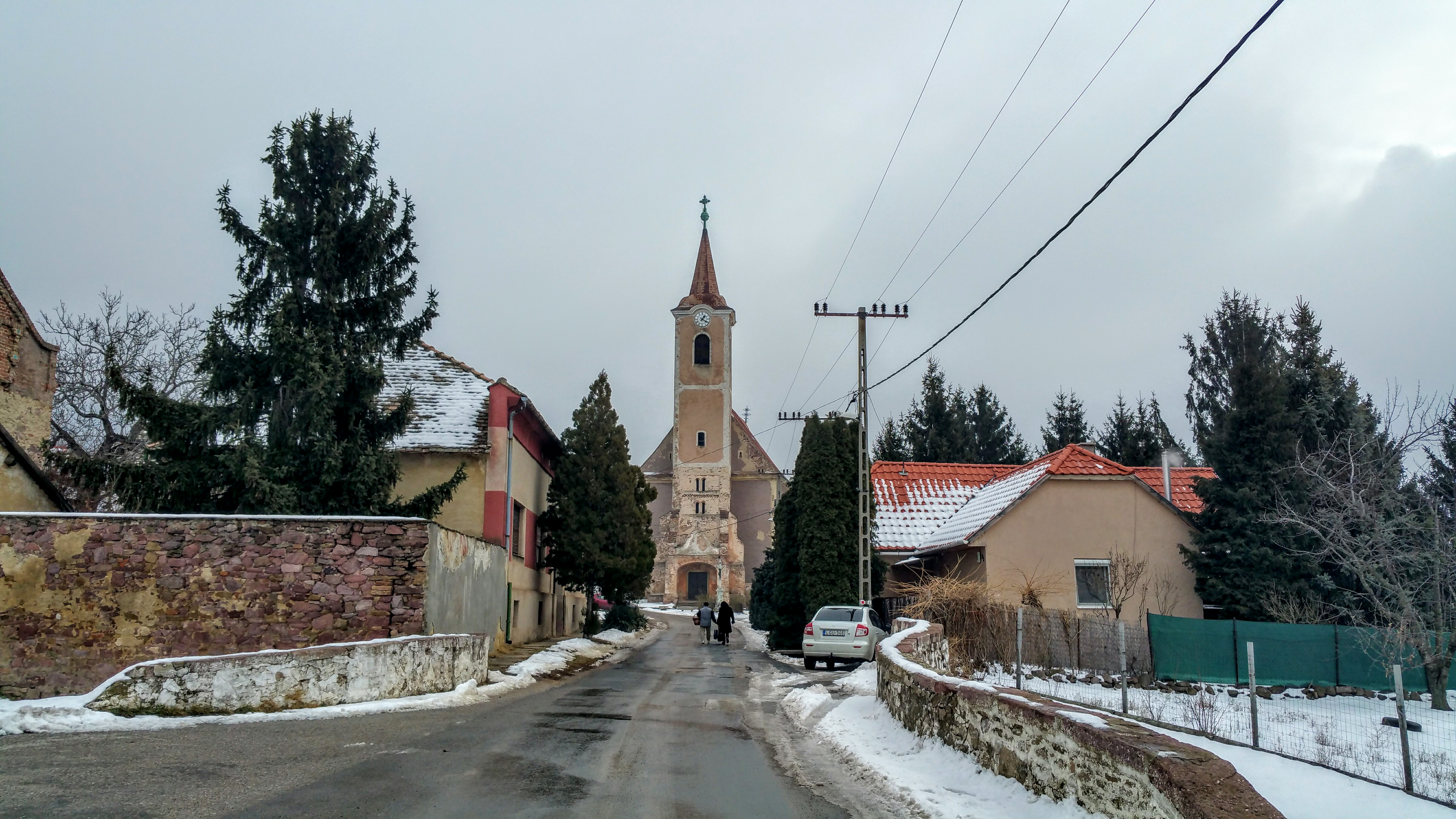
- Catholic Church in Kővágószőlős

- Coat of arms

- Location of Kővágószőlős
- Coordinates: 46.08126°N 18.12388°E
- Country: Hungary
- County: Baranya

Area
  - Total: 18.25 km^{2} (7.05 sq mi)

Population (2004)
  - Total: 1,331
  - Density: 72.93/km^{2} (188.9/sq mi)
- Time zone: UTC+1 (CET)
  - Summer (DST): UTC+2 (CEST)
- Postal code: 7673
- Area code: 72

Kővágószőlős (Croatian: Kovasiluš) is a village in Baranya County, Hungary.

== History ==
Archeological evidence suggests the area has been inhabited since the Palaeolithic. During the Bronze Age and Iron Age, one of the Carpathian Basin's most monumental hillforts stood atop the Jakab-hegy mountain which rises above Kővágószőlős.
