= Baranya County 4th constituency =

Constituency in Hungary (2012-)

Coordinates: 46°02′51″N 17°47′58″E

Baranya County 4th constituency (Szigetvár)
- Constituency for the National Assembly
- Location of Baranya county 04 within Baranya county

- Location of Baranya county within Hungary
- County: Baranya
- Electorate: 77,081 (2018)
- Major settlements: Szigetvár

Current constituency
- Created: 2011
- Party: Tisza Party
- Member: Balázs Kapronczai
- Elected: 2026

The 4th constituency of Baranya County (Hungarian: Baranya megyei 04. számú országgyűlési egyéni választókerület) is one of the single member constituencies of the National Assembly, the national legislature of Hungary. The constituency standard abbreviation: Baranya 04. OEVK.

Since 2026, it has been represented by Balázs Kapronczai of the Tisza Party.

== Geography ==
The 4th constituency is located in western part of Baranya County.

=== List of municipalities ===
The constituency includes the following municipalities:

1. Abaliget
2. Adorjás
3. Almamellék
4. Almáskeresztúr
5. Alsószentmárton
6. Aranyosgadány
7. Áta
8. Babarcszőlős
9. Bakóca
10. Bakonya
11. Baksa
12. Bánfa
13. Baranyahídvég
14. Baranyajenő
15. Baranyaszentgyörgy
16. Basal
17. Besence
18. Bicsérd
19. Bisse
20. Boda
21. Bodolyabér
22. Bogádmindszent
23. Bogdása
24. Boldogasszonyfa
25. Bosta
26. Botykapeterd
27. Bükkösd
28. Bürüs
29. Cún
30. Csányoszró
31. Csarnóta
32. Csebény
33. Cserdi
34. Csertő
35. Csonkamindszent
36. Dencsháza
37. Dinnyeberki
38. Diósviszló
39. Drávacsehi
40. Drávacsepely
41. Drávafok
42. Drávaiványi
43. Drávakeresztúr
44. Drávapalkonya
45. Drávapiski
46. Drávaszabolcs
47. Drávaszerdahely
48. Drávasztára
49. Endrőc
50. Felsőegerszeg
51. Felsőszentmárton
52. Garé
53. Gerde
54. Gerényes
55. Gilvánfa
56. Gordisa
57. Gödre
58. Görcsöny
59. Gyöngyfa
60. Gyöngyösmellék
61. Harkány
62. Hegyszentmárton
63. Helesfa
64. Hetvehely
65. Hirics
66. Hobol
67. Horváthertelend
68. Husztót
69. Ibafa
70. Ipacsfa
71. Kacsóta
72. Kákics
73. Katádfa
74. Kémes
75. Kemse
76. Kétújfalu
77. Királyegyháza
78. Kisasszonyfa
79. Kisbeszterce
80. Kisdér
81. Kisdobsza
82. Kishajmás
83. Kistamási
84. Kistótfalu
85. Kisvaszar
86. Kisszentmárton
87. Kórós
88. Kovácshida
89. Kovácsszénája
90. Kővágótöttös
91. Liget
92. Lúzsok
93. Magyarhertelend
94. Magyarlukafa
95. Magyarmecske
96. Magyarszék
97. Magyartelek
98. Márfa
99. Markóc
100. Marócsa
101. Matty
102. Mecsekpölöske
103. Merenye
104. Meződ
105. Mindszentgodisa
106. Molvány
107. Mozsgó
108. Nagycsány
109. Nagydobsza
110. Nagypeterd
111. Nagyváty
112. Nemeske
113. Nyugotszenterzsébet
114. Ócsárd
115. Okorág
116. Okorvölgy
117. Oroszló
118. Ózdfalu
119. Palé
120. Páprád
121. Patapoklosi
122. Pécsbagota
123. Pellérd
124. Pettend
125. Piskó
126. Rádfalva
127. Regenye
128. Rózsafa
129. Sámod
130. Sásd
131. Sellye
132. Siklós
133. Siklósbodony
134. Somogyapáti
135. Somogyhárságy
136. Somogyhatvan
137. Somogyviszló
138. Sósvertike
139. Sumony
140. Szabadszentkirály
141. Szágy
142. Szalánta
143. Szaporca
144. Szava
145. Szentdénes
146. Szentegát
147. Szentkatalin
148. Szentlászló
149. Szentlőrinc
150. Szigetvár
151. Szilvás
152. Szőke
153. Szörény
154. Szulimán
155. Tarrós
156. Tékes
157. Teklafalu
158. Tengeri
159. Tésenfa
160. Téseny
161. Tormás
162. Tótszentgyörgy
163. Túrony
164. Vajszló
165. Várad
166. Varga
167. Vásárosbéc
168. Vásárosdombó
169. Vázsnok
170. Vejti
171. Velény
172. Zádor
173. Zaláta
174. Zók

== Members ==
The constituency was first represented by Zsolt Tiffán of the Fidesz from 2014 to 2018. Csaba Nagy of the Fidesz was elected in 2018 and he was re-elected in 2022. In the 2026 election, Balázs Kapronczai of the Tisza Party was elected representative.

Election	Member	Party	%	Ref.
2014	Zsolt Tiffán	Fidesz	44.06	
2018	Csaba Nagy	Fidesz	48.93	
2022	Csaba Nagy	Fidesz	61.08	
2026	Balázs Kapronczai	Tisza Party	50.66	
