= Pettend =

- Village
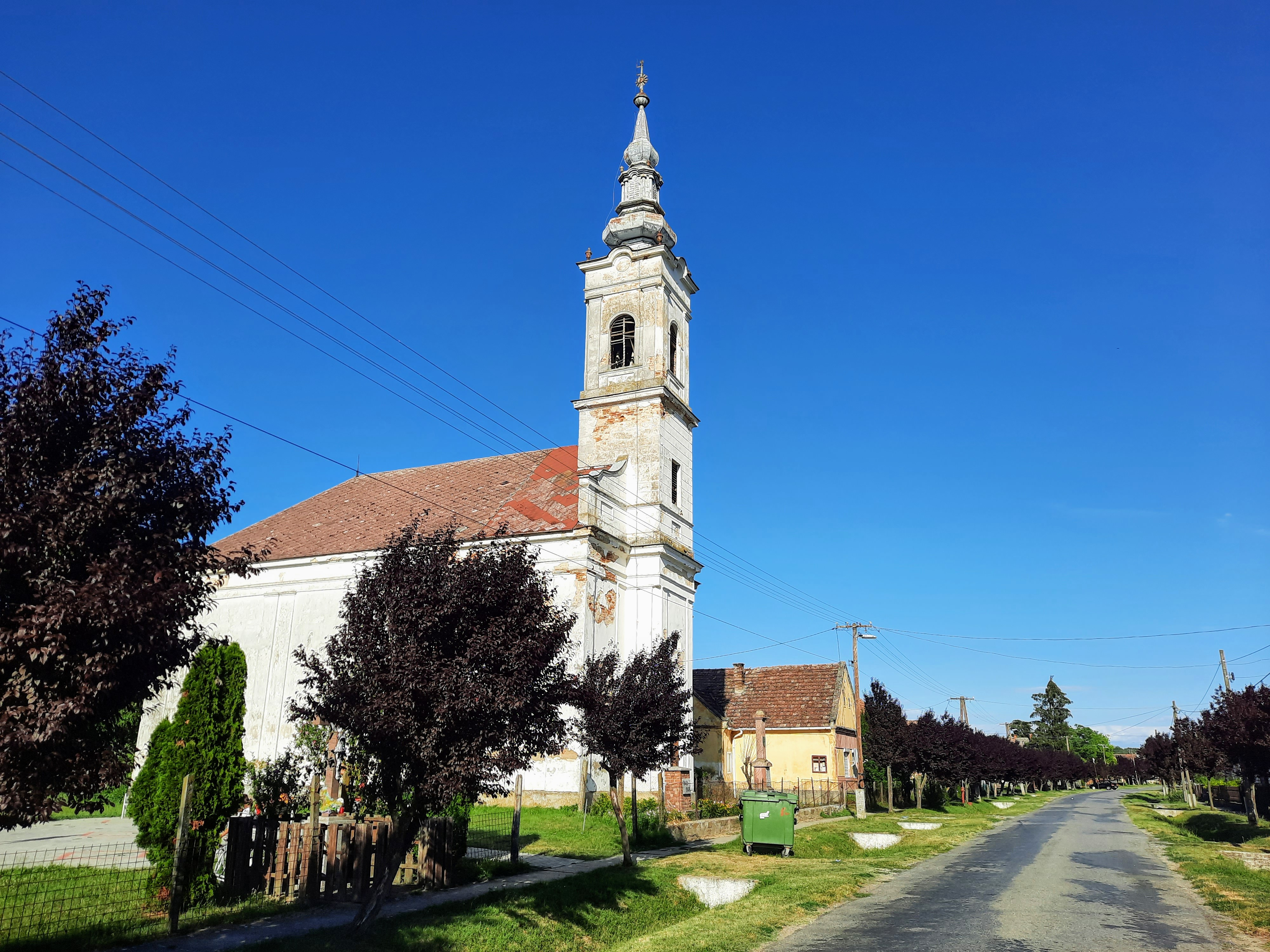

- Location of Pettend in Hungary
- Coordinates: 46°00′03″N 17°41′58″E
- Country: Hungary
- Region: Southern Transdanubia
- County: Baranya

Government
  - Mayor: Lakatos Sándor

Population (2012)
  - Total: 149
- Time zone: UTC+1 (CET)
  - Summer (DST): UTC+2 (CEST)
- Postal code: 7972
- Area code: +36
- KSH code: 29762

Pettend (Croatian: Petan) is a village in Szigetvári district of Baranya County, Hungary. As of 2012 it had a population of 149.

Pettend lies to the south of the confluence of the Szigetvár and Kistamási rivers.

== History ==
The first mention of Pettend was in 1330, spelled Petend, and assigned to the estate of Peter Siklósi. In 1449 the land was divided between three families of landed gentry, Thuz, Letai, and Szőcsényi. In 1493 the estate was bought by Mihályné Kornis, that is, the wife of Mihály Kornis. In the 18th century, Count László Nádasdy inhabited the area. In the 20th century, with changes in boundaries, it became part of Somogy County.

== Notable people ==
- Györffy György
