= Balázs Kapronczai =

Hungarian politician

Member of the National Assembly
- Assuming office 9 May 2026
- Succeeding: Csaba Nagy
- Constituency: Baranya 4th

Personal details
- Party: Tisza

Balázs Kapronczai is a Hungarian politician who was elected member of the National Assembly in 2026 representing the Baranya County 4th constituency. He previously worked as the principal of an art school and as a restaurant owner.
