= Szaporca =

- Village (Falva)
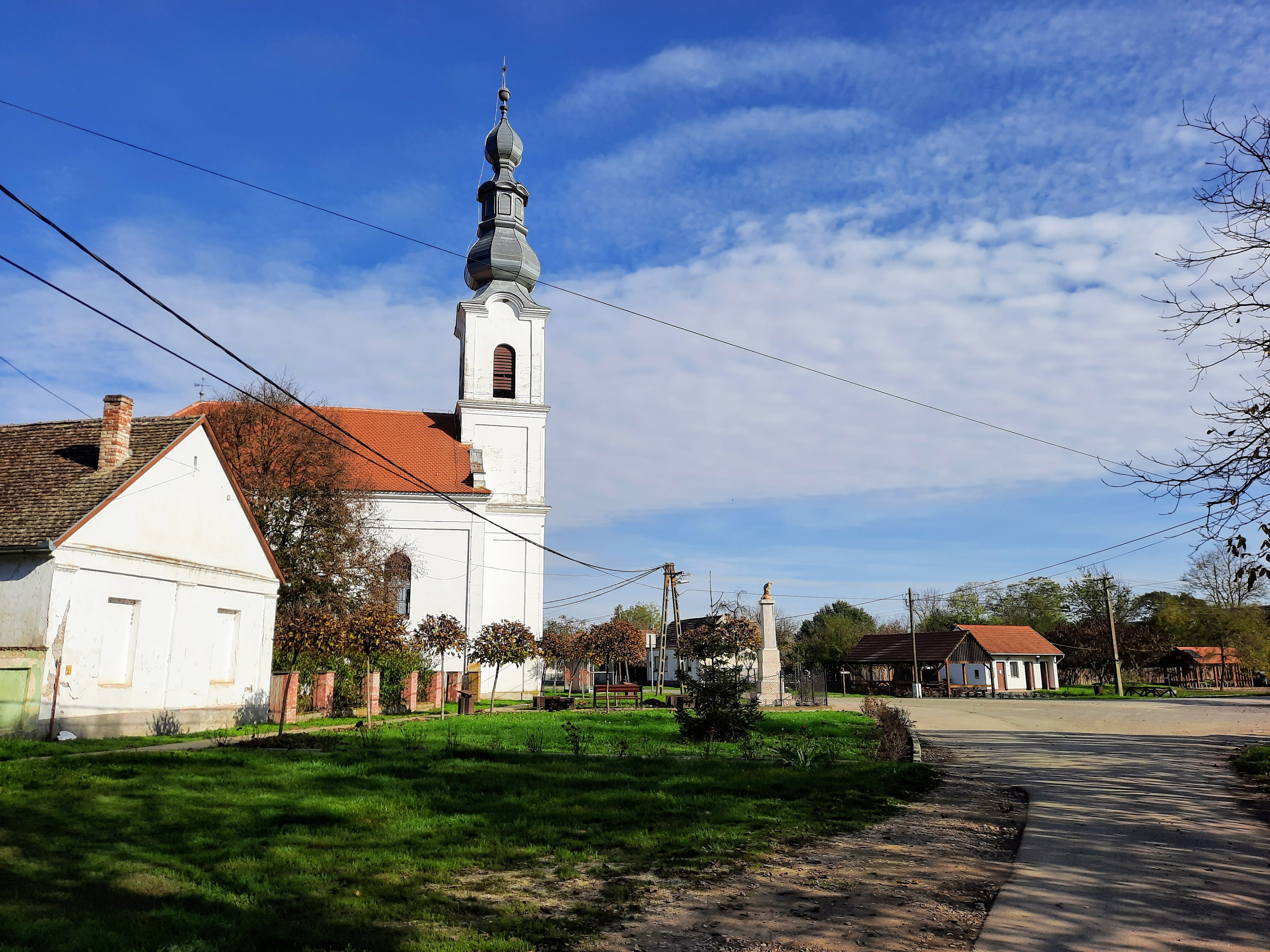

- Location of Baranya county in Hungary

- Location of Szaporca
- Coordinates: 45.81464°N 18.10442°E
- Country: Hungary
- County: Baranya

Area
  - Total: 9.65 km^{2} (3.73 sq mi)

Population (2011)
  - Total: 233
  - Density: 27.04/km^{2} (70.0/sq mi)
- Time zone: UTC+1 (CET)
  - Summer (DST): UTC+2 (CEST)
- Postal code: 7843
- Area code: 72

Szaporca (Croatian: Spornica) is a village in Baranya county, Hungary.
