= Dencsháza =

- Village
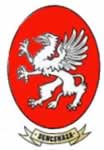
- Seal
- Interactive map of Dencsháza
- Coordinates: 46°00′N 17°50′E
- Country: Hungary
- County: Baranya
- Time zone: UTC+1 (CET)
  - Summer (DST): UTC+2 (CEST)

Dencsháza is a village in Baranya county, Hungary.
