= Babarcszőlős =

- Village
- Seal

- Location within Hungary
- Coordinates: 45°54′N 18°08′E
- Country: Hungary
- County: Baranya

Population (2025)
  - Total: 96
- Time zone: UTC+1 (CET)
  - Summer (DST): UTC+2 (CEST)

Babarcszőlős is a village in Baranya county, Hungary. It has 96 inhabitants (as of 2025).
