= Nyugotszenterzsébet =

- Location of Baranya county in Hungary

- Location of Nyugotszenterzsébet
- Coordinates: 46.07322°N 17.91110°E
- Country: Hungary
- County: Baranya

Area
  - Total: 9.22 km^{2} (3.56 sq mi)

Population (2004)
  - Total: 248
  - Density: 26.89/km^{2} (69.6/sq mi)
- Time zone: UTC+1 (CET)
  - Summer (DST): UTC+2 (CEST)
- Postal code: 7912
- Area code: 73

Nyugotszenterzsébet (Croatian: Sentžebet) is a village in Baranya county, Hungary.
