= Gyöngyfa =

- Village
- Interactive map of Gyöngyfa
- Coordinates: 45°58′N 17°57′E
- Country: Hungary
- County: Baranya

Population (2015)
  - Total: 134
- Time zone: UTC+1 (CET)
  - Summer (DST): UTC+2 (CEST)

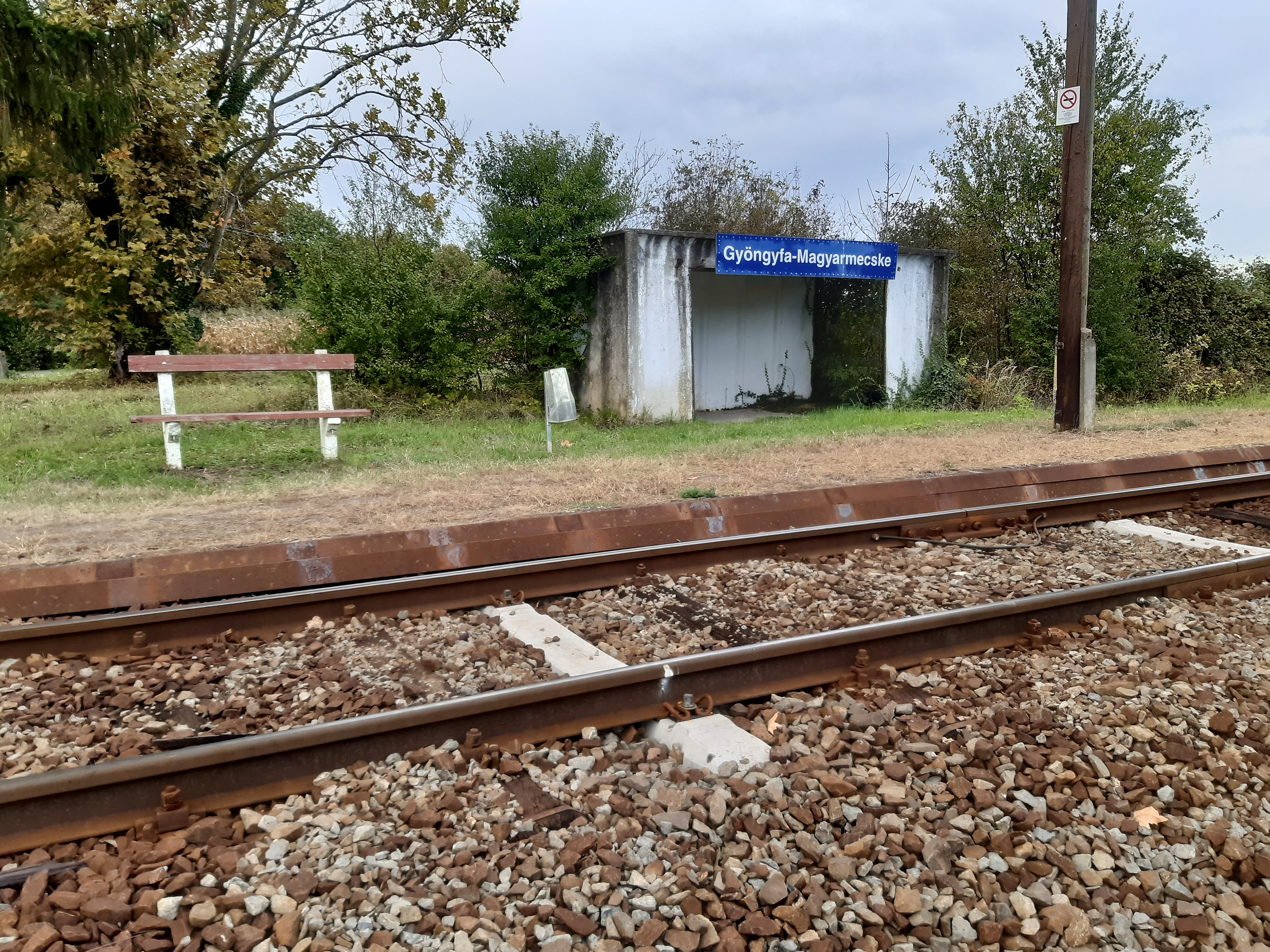
Gyöngyfa-Magyarmecske railway stop

Gyöngyfa is a village in Baranya county, Hungary.
