= Matty, Hungary =

Matty
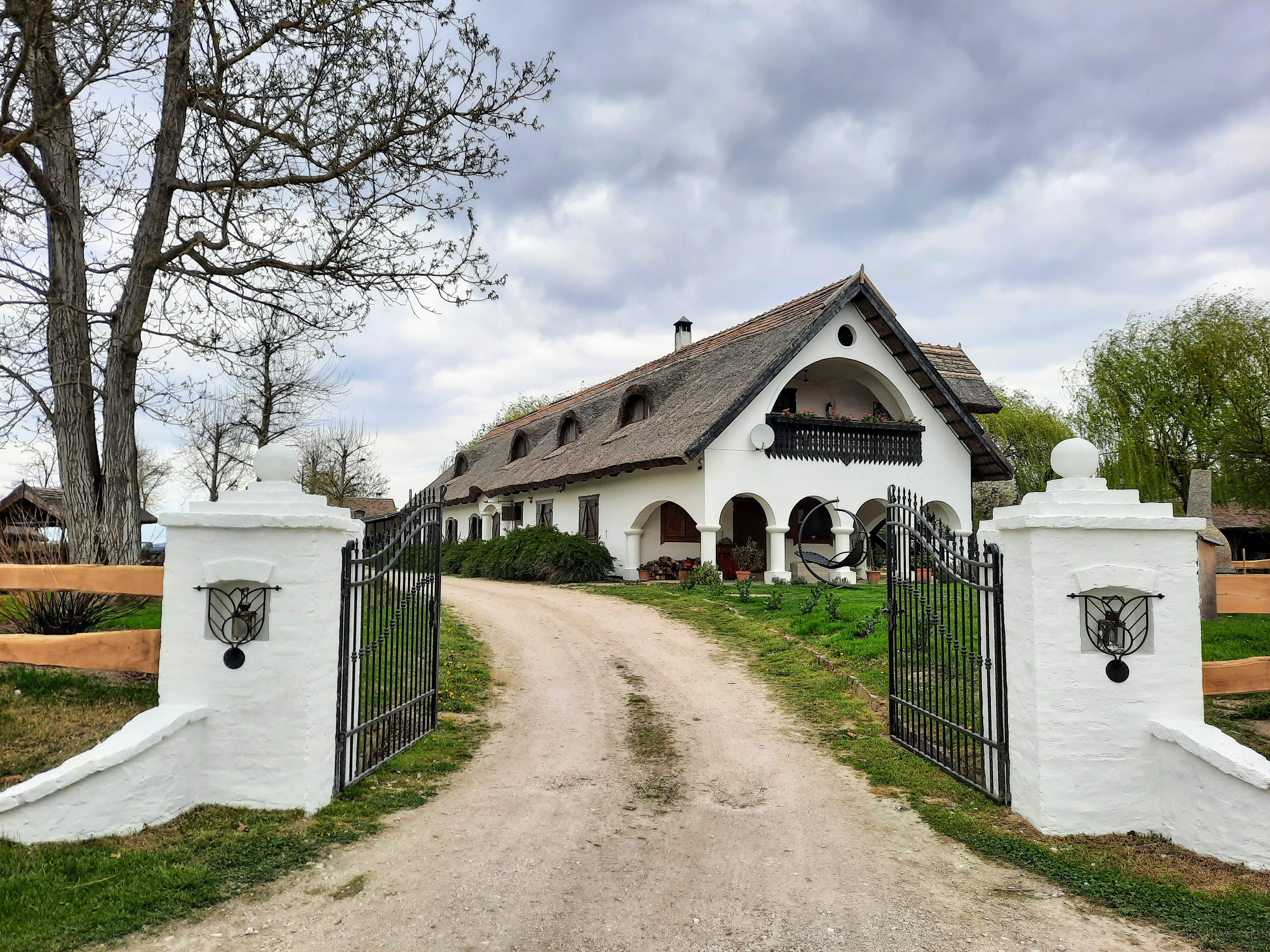

- Location of Baranya county in Hungary

- Location of Matty, Hungary
- Coordinates: 45.79858°N 18.26660°E
- Country: Hungary
- County: Baranya

Area
  - Total: 16.9 km^{2} (6.5 sq mi)

Population (2025)
  - Total: 326
- Time zone: UTC+1 (CET)
  - Summer (DST): UTC+2 (CEST)
- Postal code: 7854
- Area code: 72

Matty (Hungarian pronunciation: [ˈmɒcː]; Croatian: Maća) is a village in Baranya county, Hungary. As of 2004, the population was 369.
