= Endrőc =

- Village
- Interactive map of Endrőc
- Coordinates: 45°56′N 17°46′E
- Country: Hungary
- County: Baranya

Area
  - Total: 4.37 sq mi (11.33 km^{2})

Population (2015)
  - Total: 362
  - Density: 82.8/sq mi (32.0/km^{2})
- Time zone: UTC+1 (CET)
  - Summer (DST): UTC+2 (CEST)

Endrőc is a village in Baranya county, Hungary.
