= Csertő =

- Village
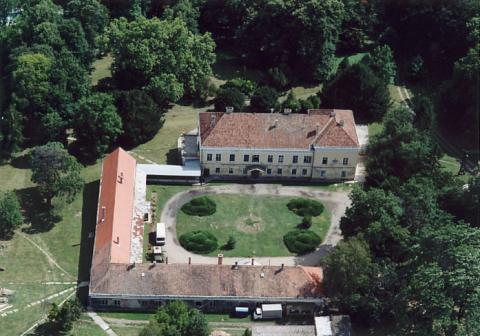
- Csertő kastély

- Coat of arms
- Interactive map of Csertő
- Coordinates: 46°06′N 17°49′E
- Country: Hungary
- County: Baranya
- Time zone: UTC+1 (CET)
  - Summer (DST): UTC+2 (CEST)

Csertő is a village in Baranya county, Hungary.
