= Nagyváty =

- Village
- Interactive map of Nagyváty
- Coordinates: 46°04′N 17°56′E
- Country: Hungary
- County: Baranya

Population (2025)
  - Total: 290
- Time zone: UTC+1 (CET)
  - Summer (DST): UTC+2 (CEST)

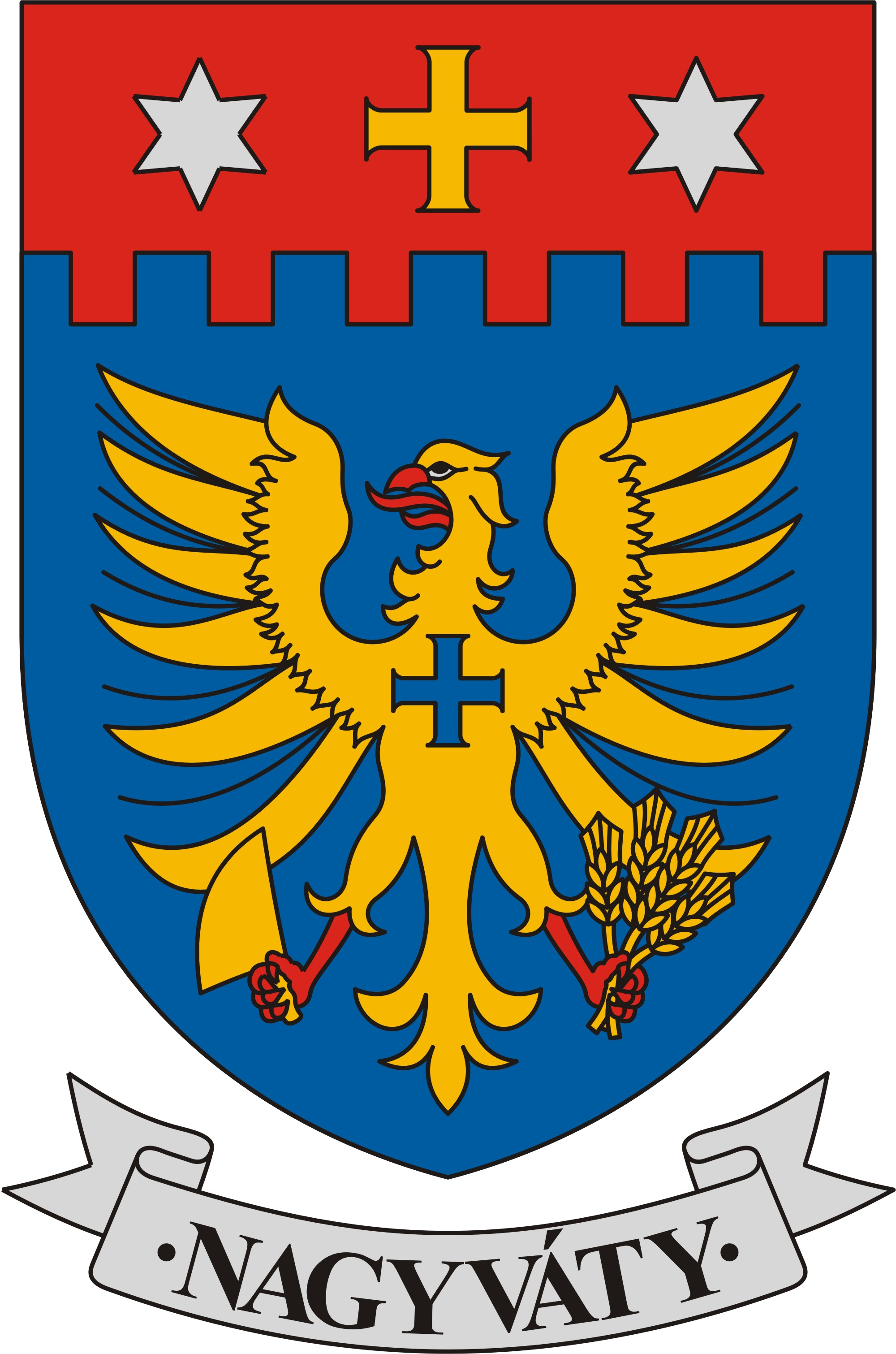
Nagyváty's coat of arms.

Nagyváty is a village in Baranya county, Hungary.
