= Alsószentmárton =

- Village
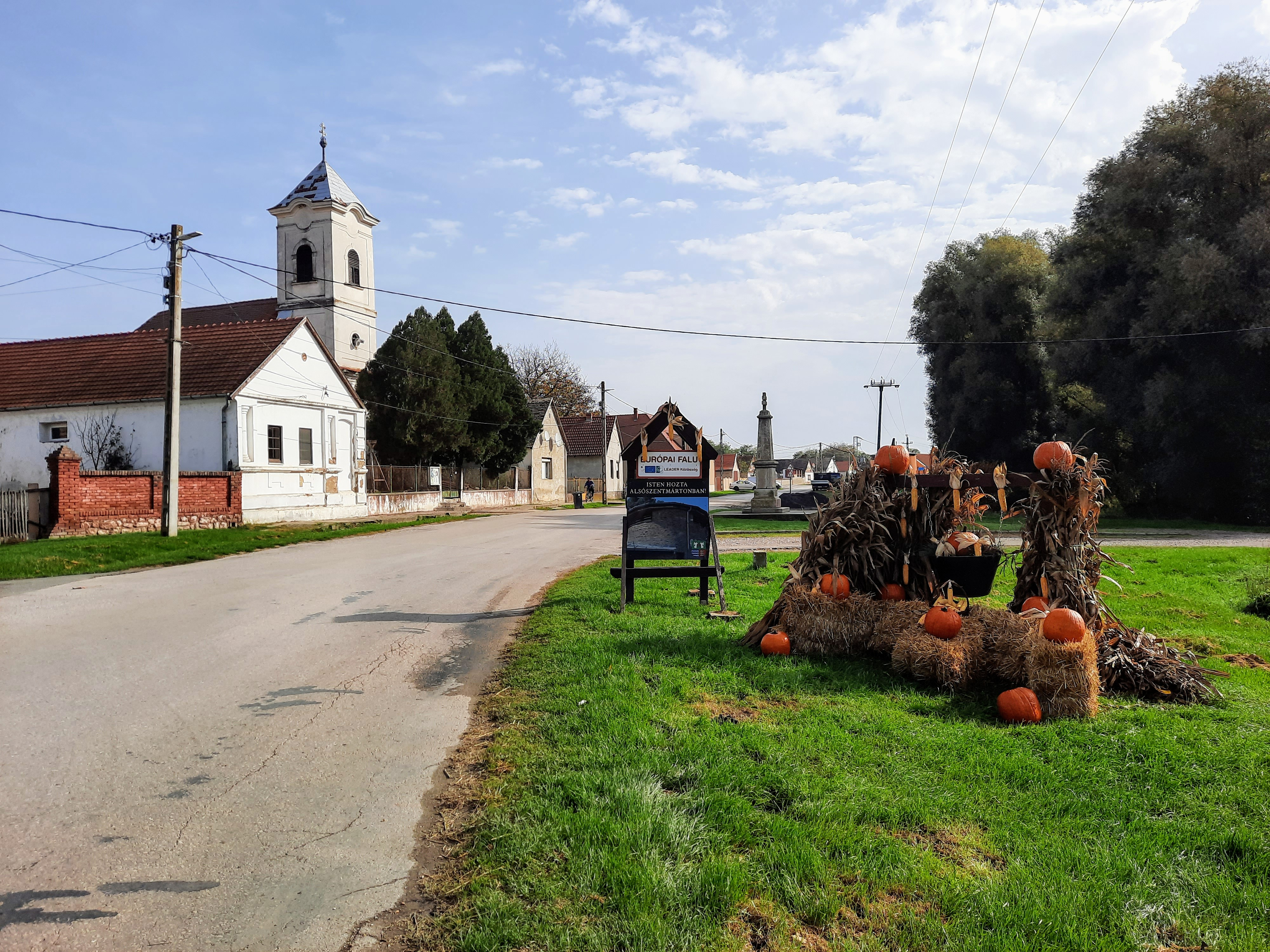

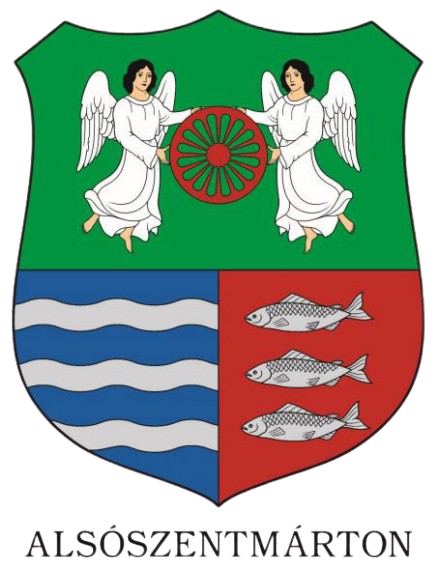
- Seal
- Interactive map of Alsószentmárton
- Coordinates: 45°47′N 18°18′E
- Country: Hungary
- County: Baranya
- Time zone: UTC+1 (CET)
  - Summer (DST): UTC+2 (CEST)

Alsószentmárton is a village in Baranya county, Hungary. It is located near the border with Croatia.

The village has a majority Romani population.

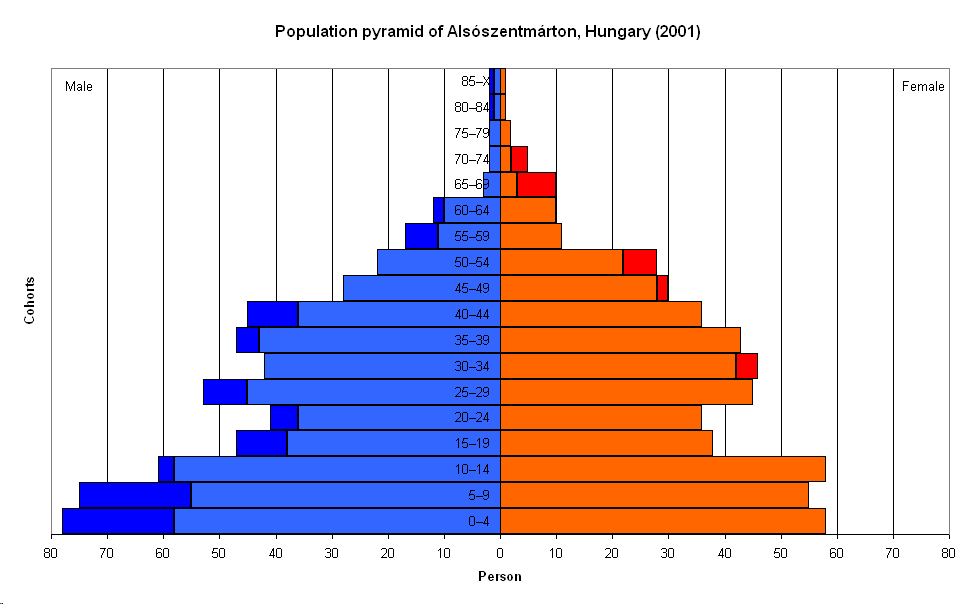
Population pyramid.
