= Drávapiski =

- Village
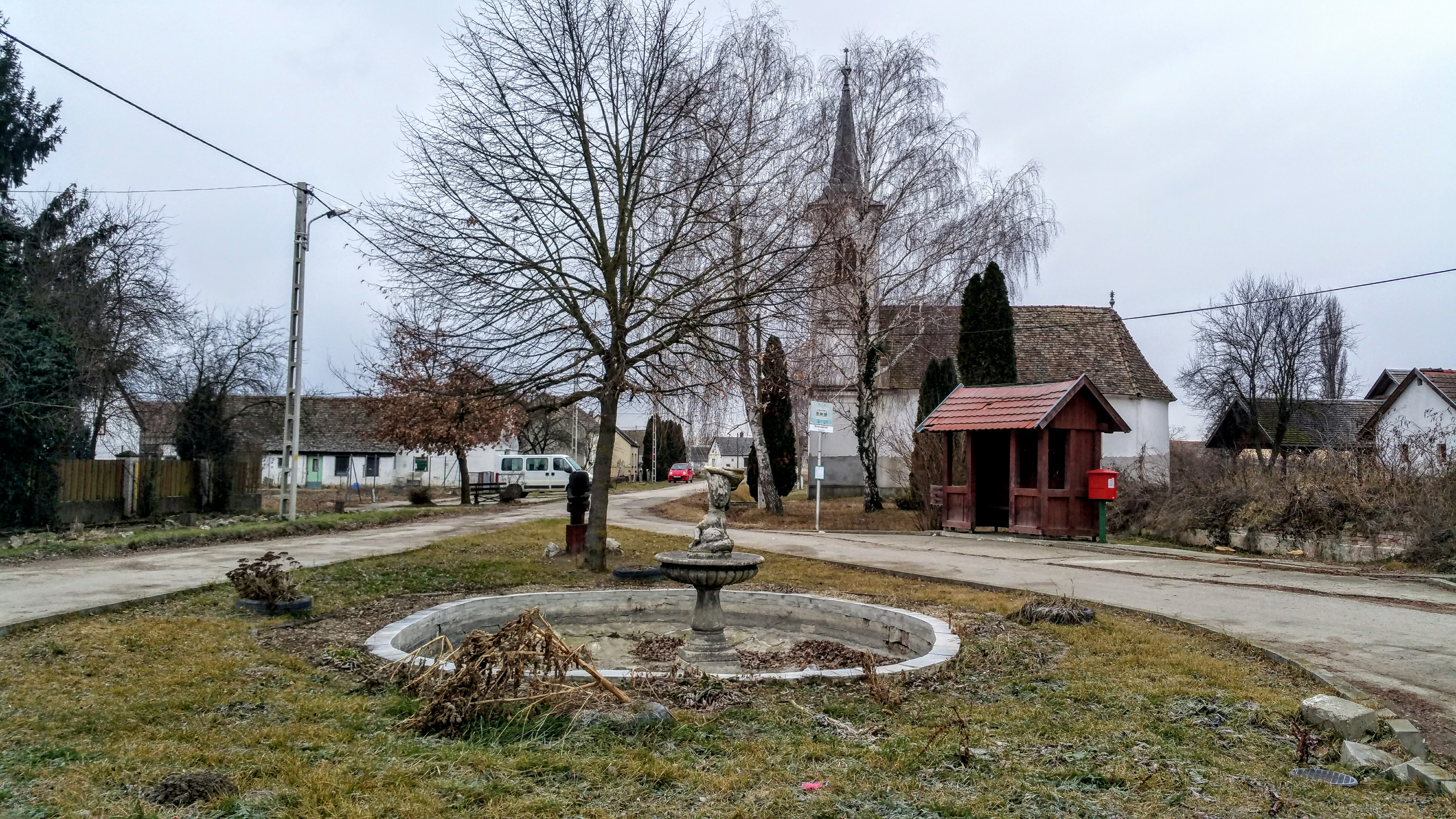
- Interactive map of Drávapiski
- Coordinates: 45°50′N 18°06′E
- Country: Hungary
- County: Baranya

Area
  - Total: 1.90 sq mi (4.91 km^{2})

Population (2015)
  - Total: 79
  - Density: 42/sq mi (16/km^{2})
- Time zone: UTC+1 (CET)
  - Summer (DST): UTC+2 (CEST)

Drávapiski is a village in Baranya county, Hungary.
