= Piskó =

- Village
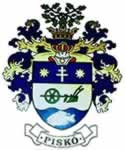
- Seal
- Interactive map of Piskó
- Coordinates: 45°49′N 17°57′E
- Country: Hungary
- County: Baranya
- Time zone: UTC+1 (CET)
  - Summer (DST): UTC+2 (CEST)

Piskó is a village in Baranya county, Hungary, a small region of Sellyei.
