= Kisdobsza =

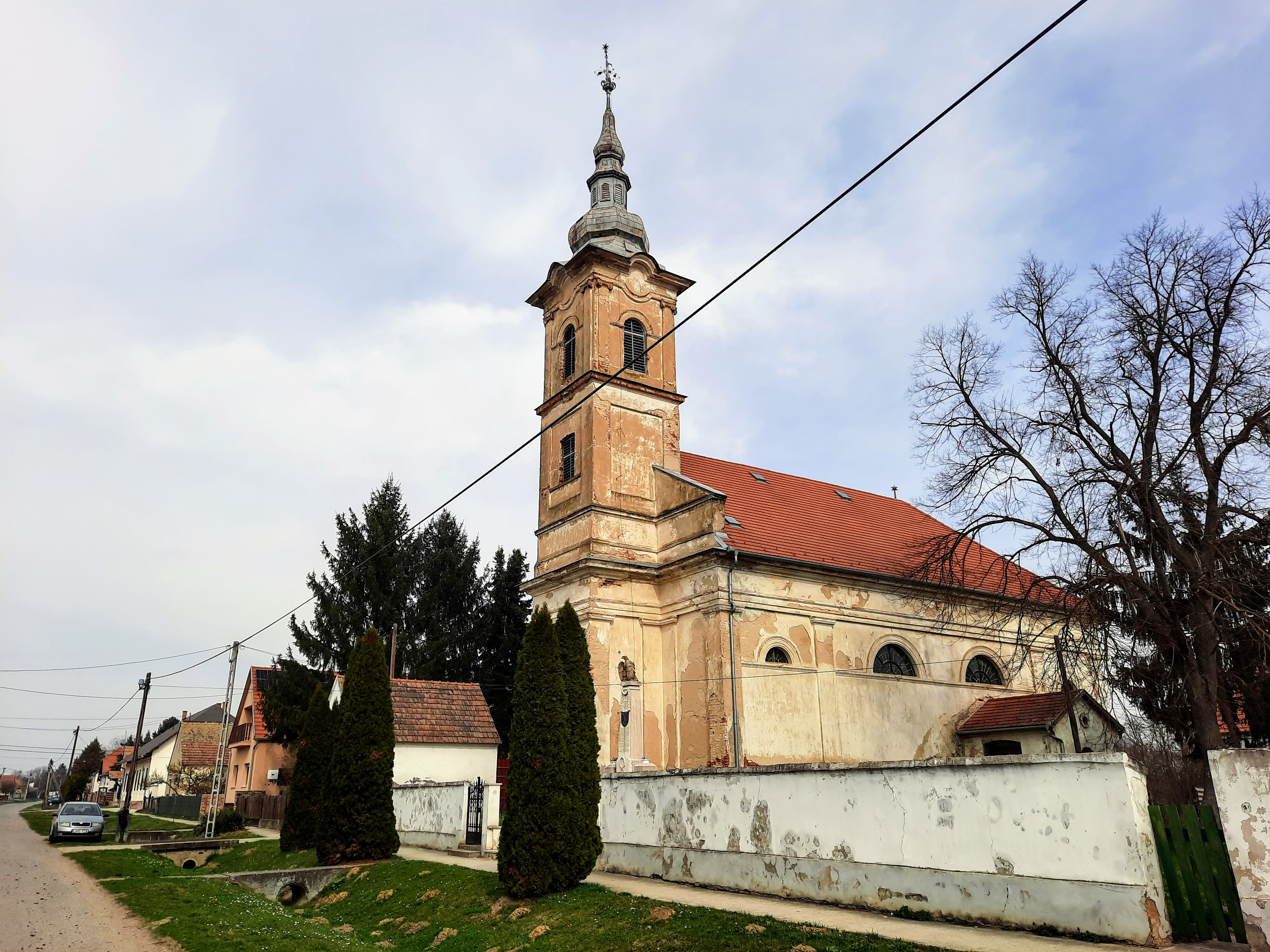

- Location of Baranya county in Hungary

- Location of Kisdobsza
- Coordinates: 46.03101°N 17.65416°E
- Country: Hungary
- County: Baranya

Area
  - Total: 9.95 km^{2} (3.84 sq mi)

Population (2004)
  - Total: 243
  - Density: 24.42/km^{2} (63.2/sq mi)
- Time zone: UTC+1 (CET)
  - Summer (DST): UTC+2 (CEST)
- Postal code: 7985
- Area code: 73

Kisdobsza is a village in Baranya county, Hungary.
