= Szentdénes =

- Village (Falva)
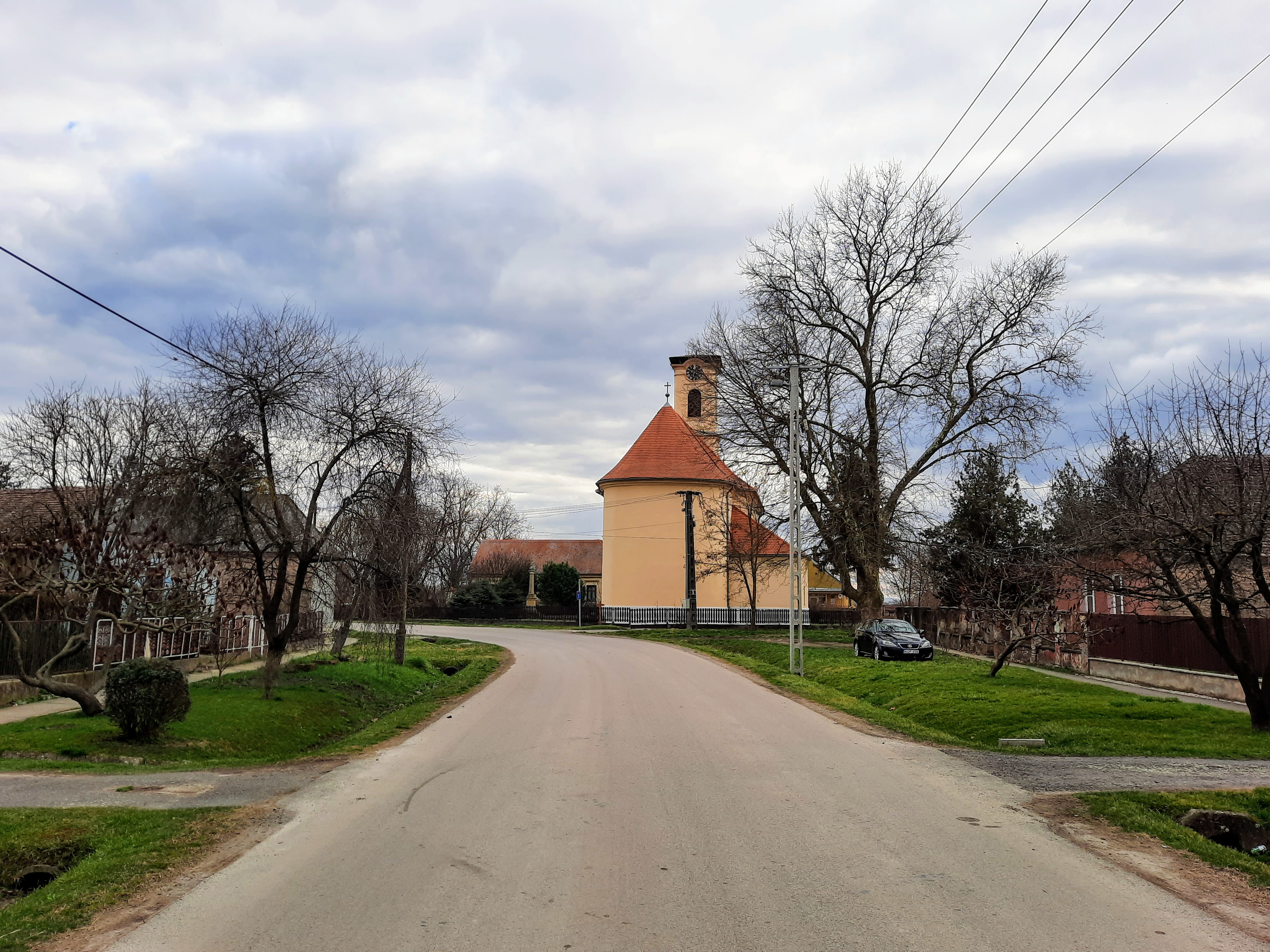
- Interactive map of Szentdénes
- Coordinates: 46°00′N 17°56′E
- Country: Hungary
- County: Baranya

Population (2025)
  - Total: 303
- Time zone: UTC+1 (CET)
  - Summer (DST): UTC+2 (CEST)

Szentdénes is a village in Baranya county, Hungary.
