= Gyöngyösmellék =

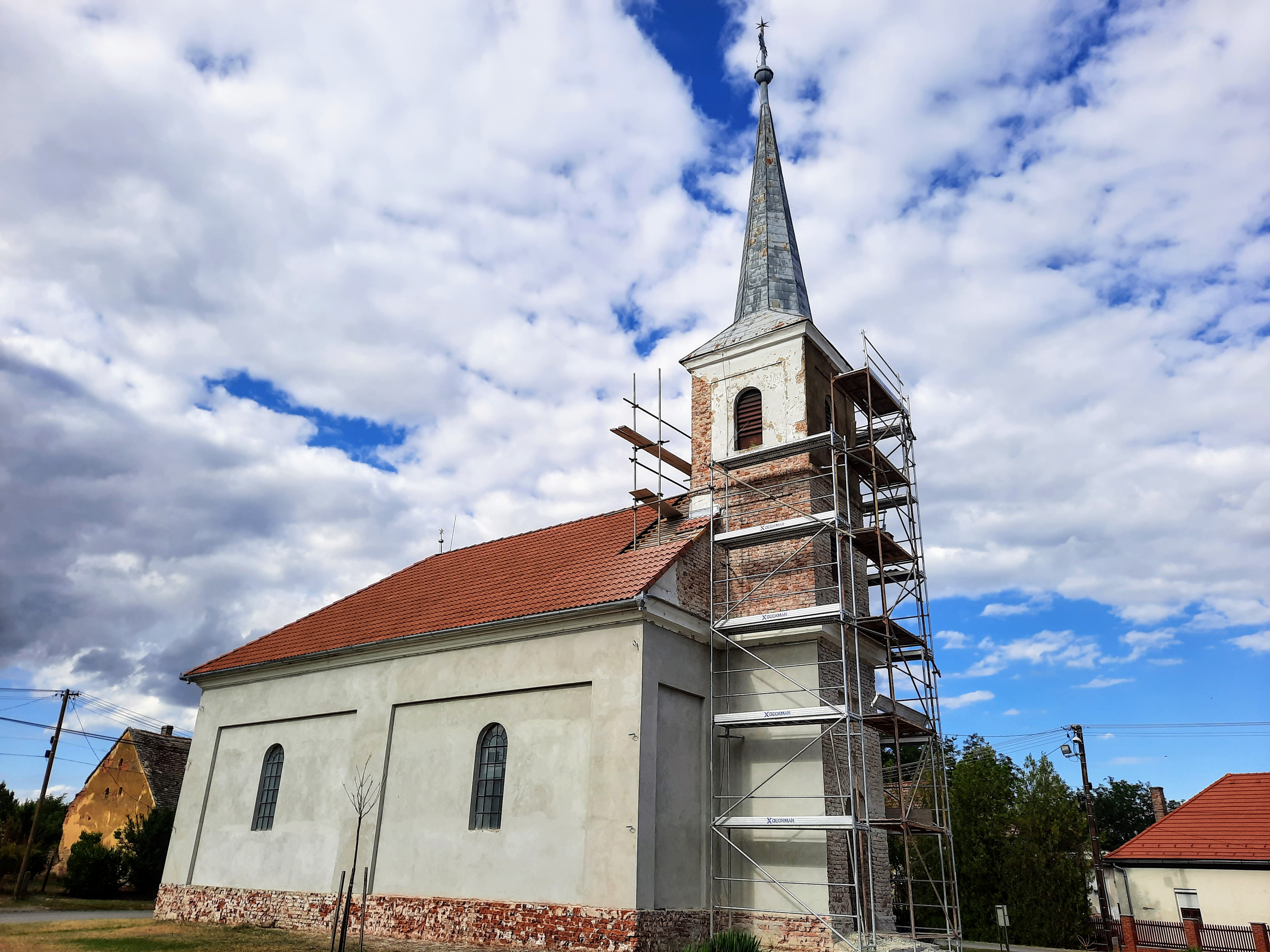

- Coat of arms

- Location of Baranya county in Hungary

- Location of Gyöngyösmellék
- Coordinates: 46.00053°N 17.70156°E
- Country: Hungary
- County: Baranya

Area
  - Total: 10.02 km^{2} (3.87 sq mi)

Population (2015)
  - Total: 296
  - Density: 29.5/km^{2} (76.5/sq mi)
- Time zone: UTC+1 (CET)
  - Summer (DST): UTC+2 (CEST)
- Postal code: 7972
- Area code: 73

Gyöngyösmellék (Croatian: Meljek, Mejek) is a village in Baranya county, Hungary.
