= Ipacsfa =

- Location of Baranya county in Hungary

- Location of Ipacsfa
- Coordinates: 45.83480°N 18.20659°E
- Country: Hungary
- County: Baranya

Area
  - Total: 6.01 km^{2} (2.32 sq mi)

Population (2004)
  - Total: 233
  - Density: 38.76/km^{2} (100.4/sq mi)
- Time zone: UTC+1 (CET)
  - Summer (DST): UTC+2 (CEST)
- Postal code: 7847
- Area code: 72

Ipacsfa is a village in Baranya county, Hungary.
