= Bodolyabér =

- Village
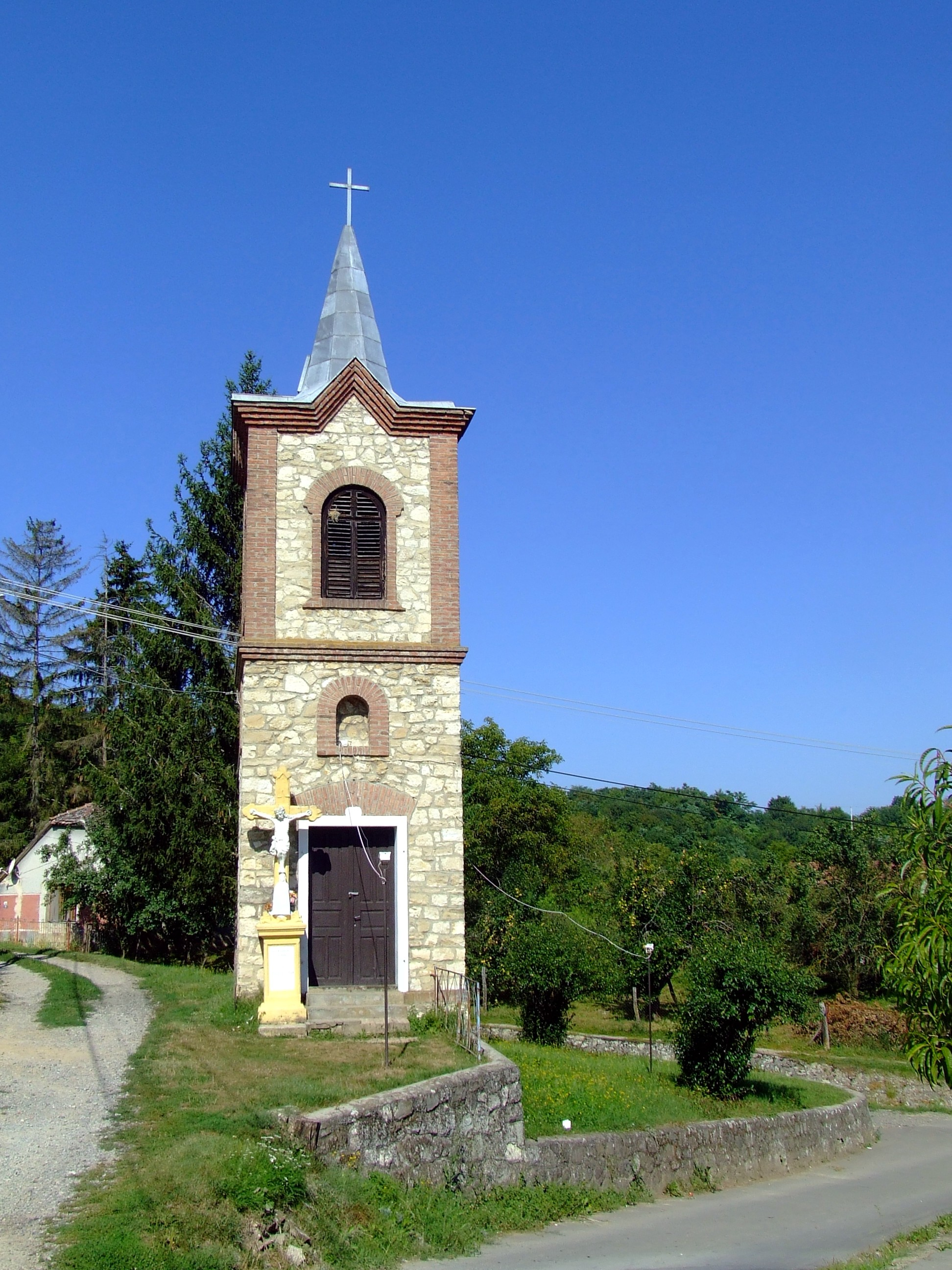
- Bodolyabér Harangtorony

- Seal
- Interactive map of Bodolyabér
- Coordinates: 46°12′N 18°07′E
- Country: Hungary
- County: Baranya
- Time zone: UTC+1 (CET)
  - Summer (DST): UTC+2 (CEST)

Bodolyabér is a village in Baranya county, Hungary.
