= Csonkamindszent =

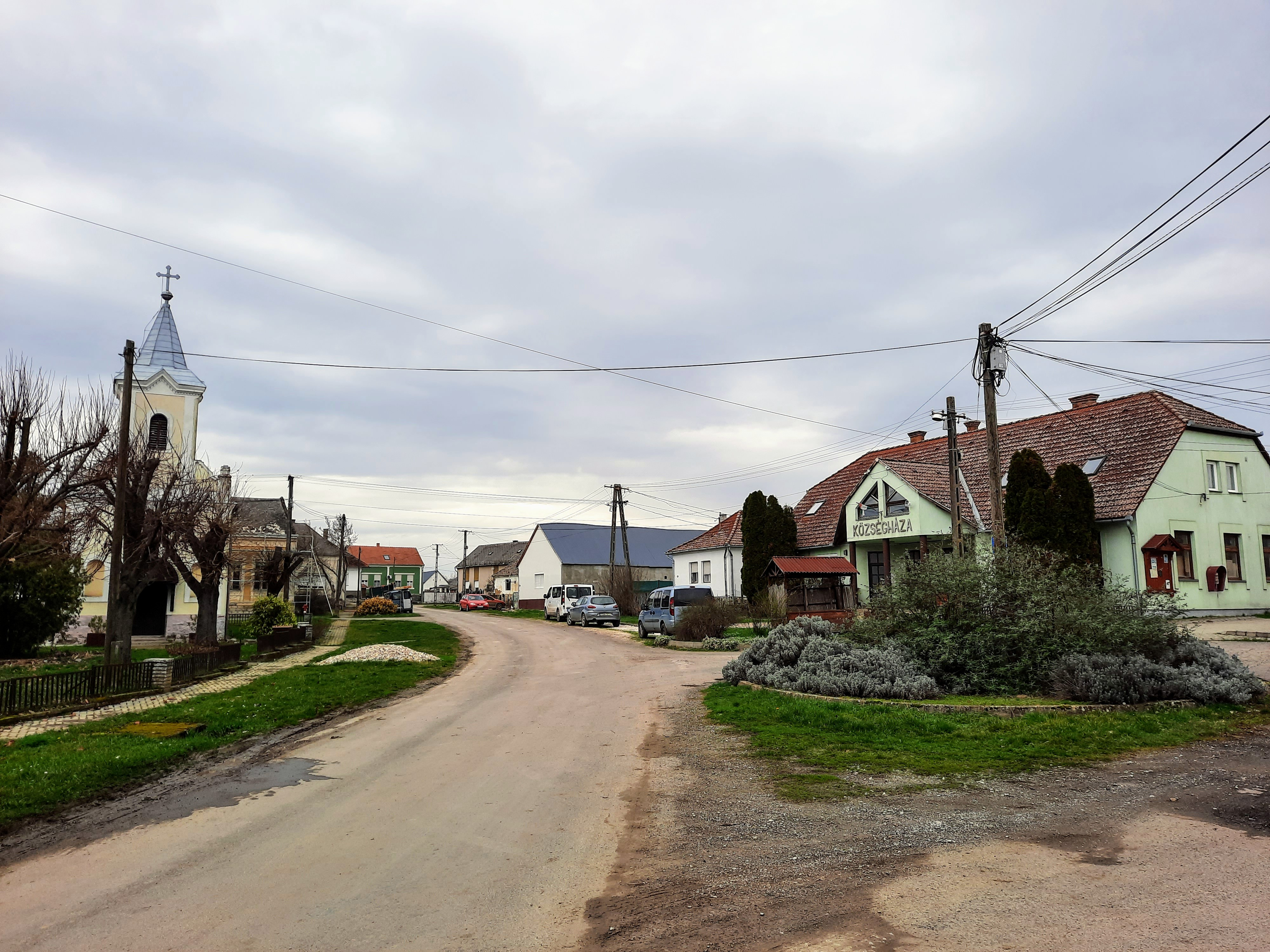

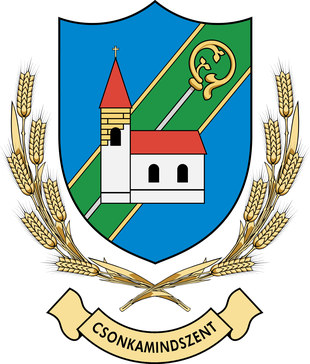
- Seal

- Location of Baranya county in Hungary

- Location of Csonkamindszent
- Coordinates: 46.05322°N 17.96556°E
- Country: Hungary
- County: Baranya

Area
  - Total: 5.52 km^{2} (2.13 sq mi)

Population (2004)
  - Total: 180
  - Density: 32.6/km^{2} (84/sq mi)
- Time zone: UTC+1 (CET)
  - Summer (DST): UTC+2 (CEST)
- Postal code: 7940
- Area code: 73

Csonkamindszent (Croatian: Senta) is a village in Baranya county, Hungary.
