= Cún =

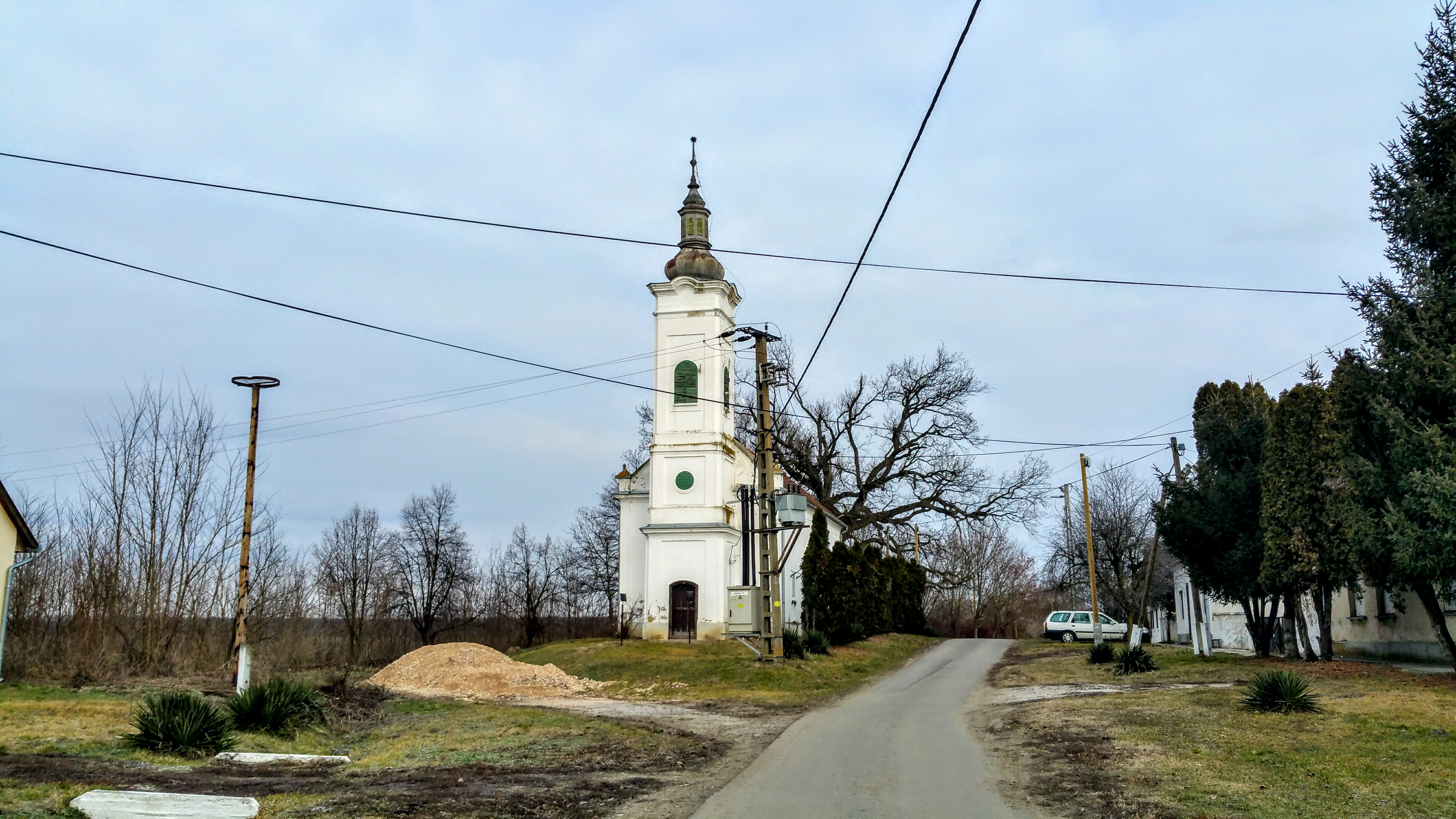

- Location of Baranya county in Hungary

- Location of Cún
- Coordinates: 45.81239°N 18.06961°E
- Country: Hungary
- County: Baranya

Area
  - Total: 18.43 km^{2} (7.12 sq mi)

Population (2004)
  - Total: 260
  - Density: 14.1/km^{2} (37/sq mi)
- Time zone: UTC+1 (CET)
  - Summer (DST): UTC+2 (CEST)
- Postal code: 7843
- Area code: 73

Cún is a village in Baranya county, Hungary.
