= Okorág =

- Village
- Interactive map of Okorág
- Coordinates: 45°55′N 17°53′E
- Country: Hungary
- County: Baranya

Population (2025)
  - Total: 139
- Time zone: UTC+1 (CET)
  - Summer (DST): UTC+2 (CEST)

Okorág is a village in Baranya county, Hungary.
