= Drávaszerdahely =

- Village
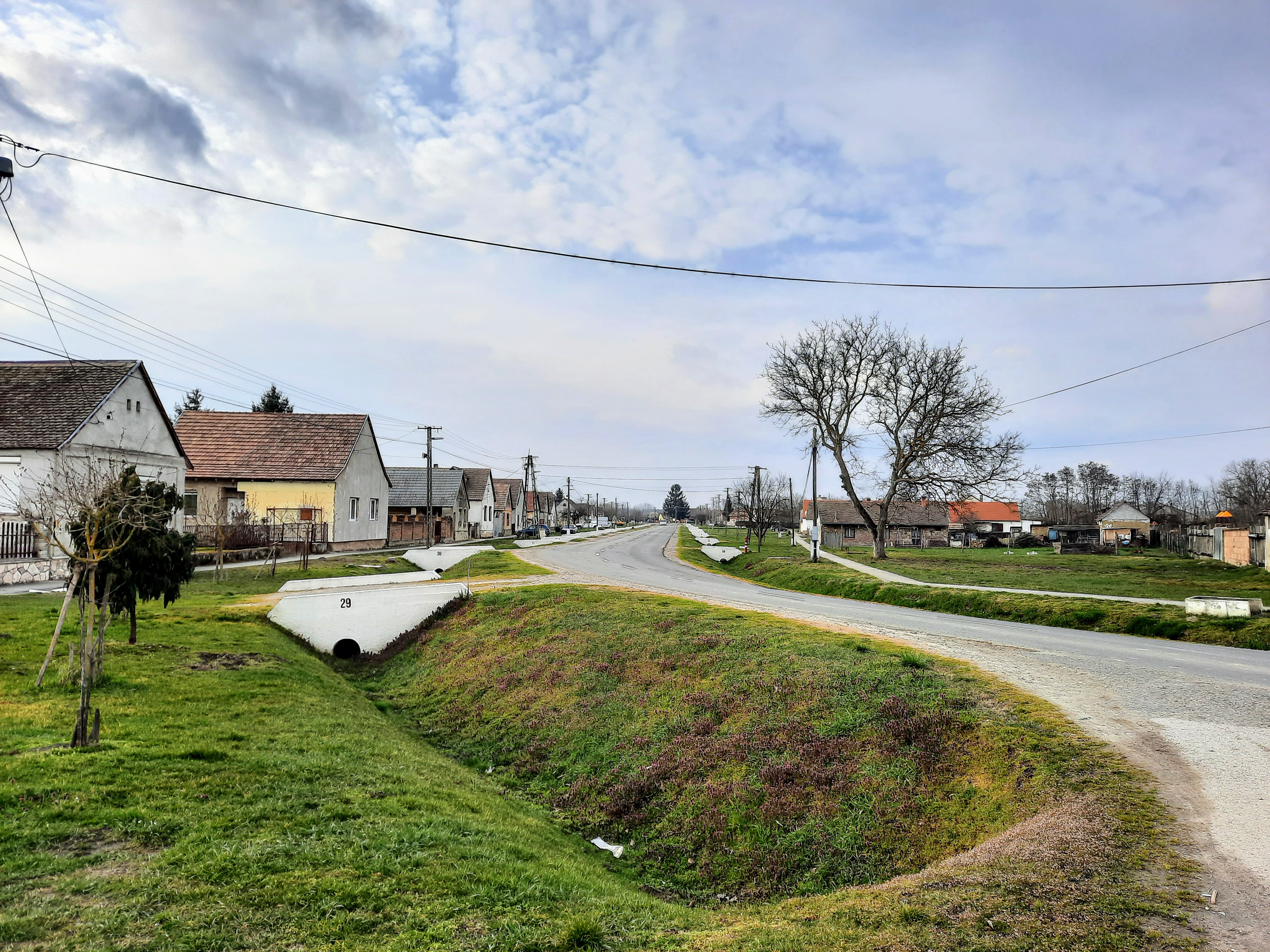
- Interactive map of Drávaszerdahely
- Coordinates: 45°50′N 18°10′E
- Country: Hungary
- County: Baranya
- Time zone: UTC+1 (CET)
  - Summer (DST): UTC+2 (CEST)

Drávaszerdahely is a village in Baranya county, Hungary.
