= Drávaiványi =

- Village
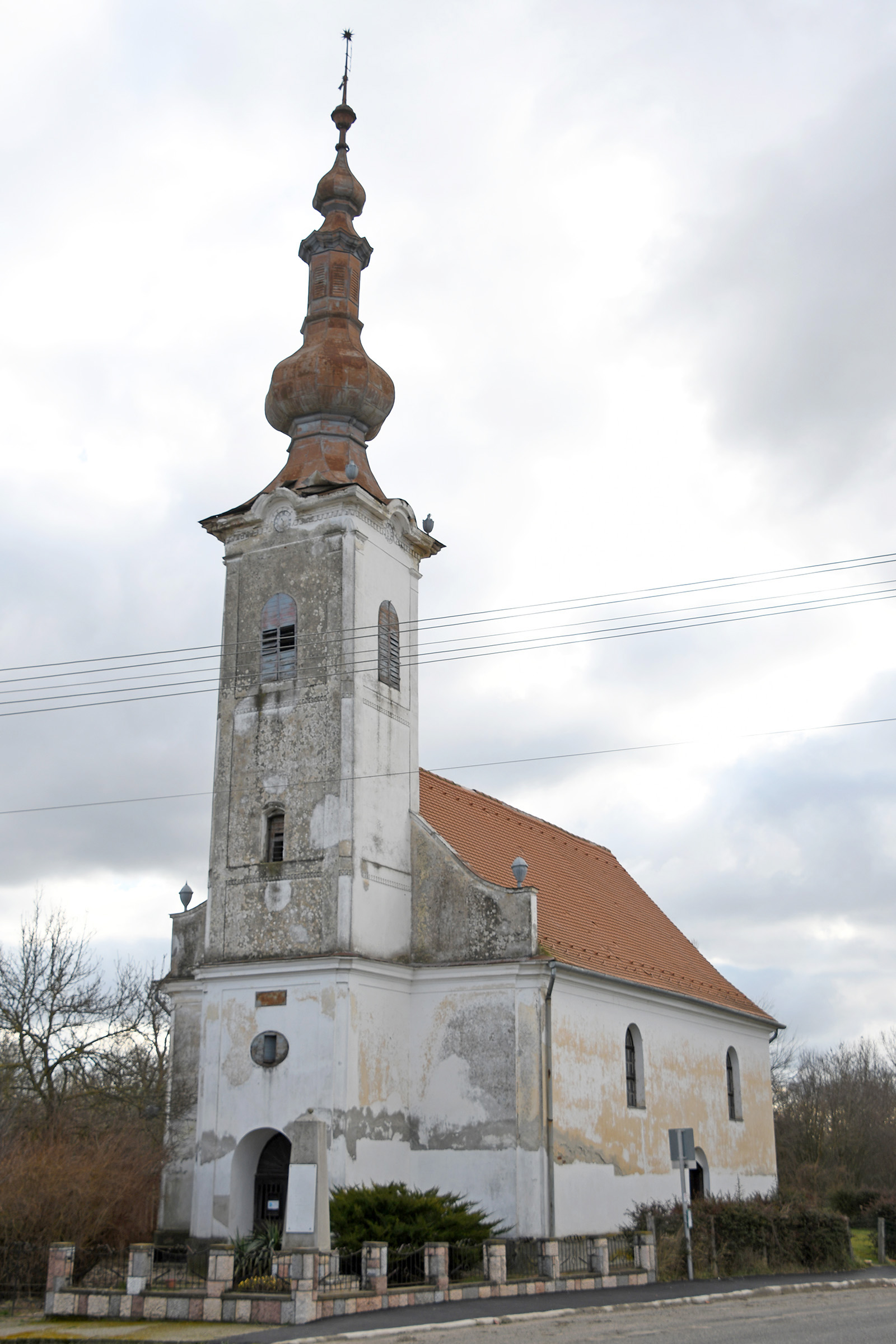
- A Hungarian Calvinist church
- Interactive map of Drávaiványi
- Coordinates: 45°51′N 17°49′E
- Country: Hungary
- County: Baranya
- Time zone: UTC+1 (CET)
  - Summer (DST): UTC+2 (CEST)

Drávaiványi is a village in Baranya county, Hungary.
