= Garé =

- Village
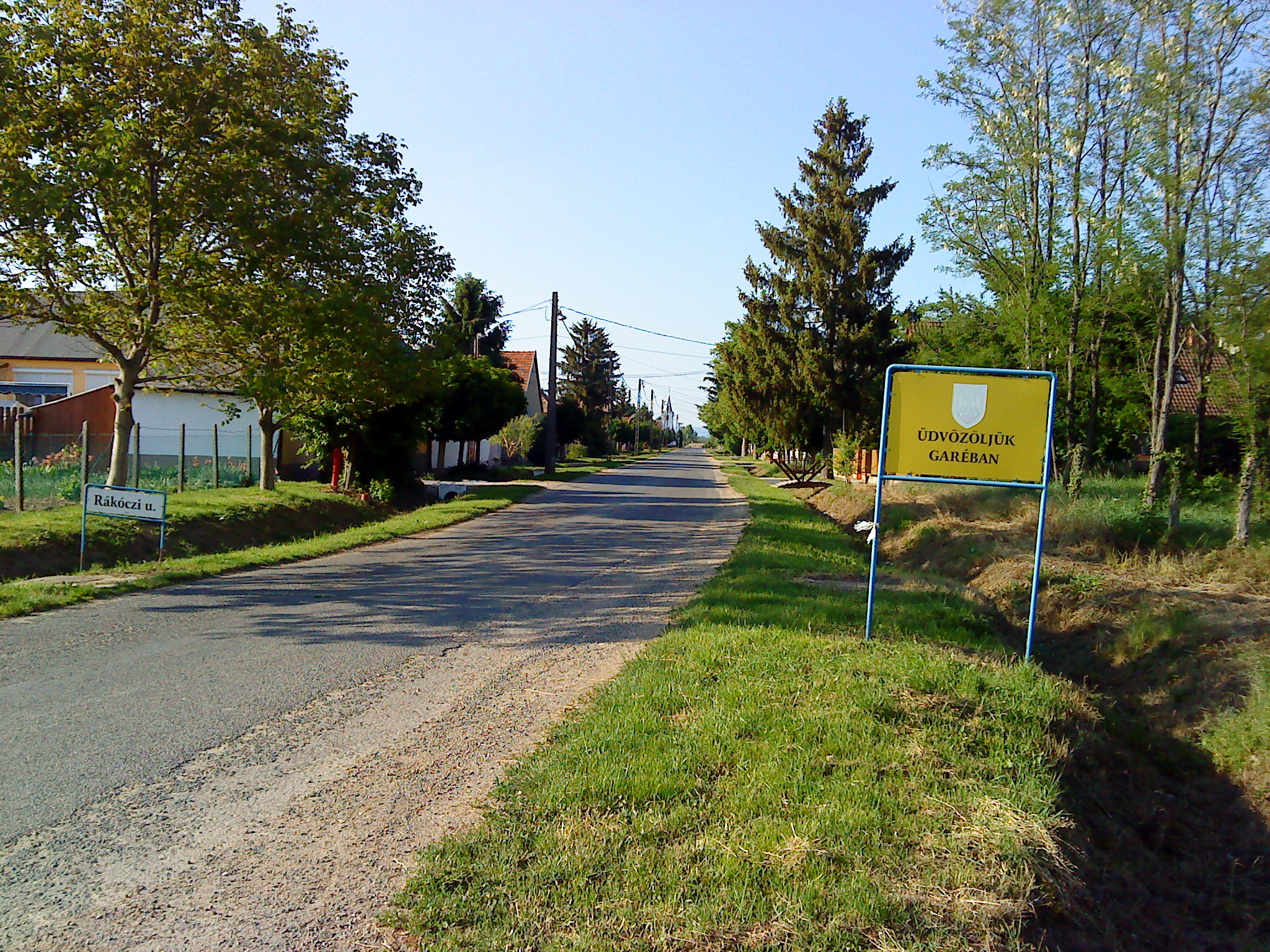
- Garé déli vége.JPG

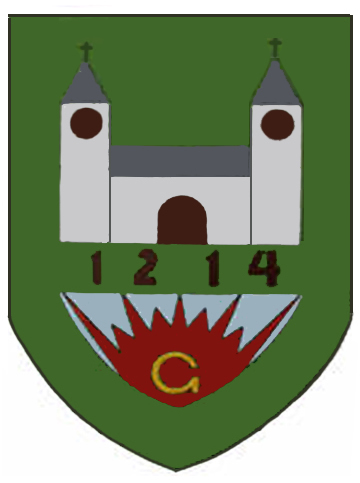
- Coat of arms
- Interactive map of Garé
- Coordinates: 45°55′N 18°12′E
- Country: Hungary
- County: Baranya

Area
  - Total: 3.29 sq mi (8.53 km^{2})

Population (2015)
  - Total: 288
  - Density: 87.4/sq mi (33.8/km^{2})
- Time zone: UTC+1 (CET)
  - Summer (DST): UTC+2 (CEST)

Garé is a village in Baranya county, Hungary.
