= Teklafalu =

- Village (Falva)
- Location of Baranya county in Hungary

- Location of Teklafalu
- Coordinates: 45.94933°N 17.72977°E
- Country: Hungary
- County: Baranya

Area
  - Total: 16.76 km^{2} (6.47 sq mi)

Population (2004)
  - Total: 354
  - Density: 21.12/km^{2} (54.7/sq mi)
- Time zone: UTC+1 (CET)
  - Summer (DST): UTC+2 (CEST)
- Postal code: 7973
- Area code: 73

Teklafalu (Croatian: Dekla) is a village in Baranya county, Hungary.
