= Felsőszentmárton =

Felsőszentmárton Martinci
- Village
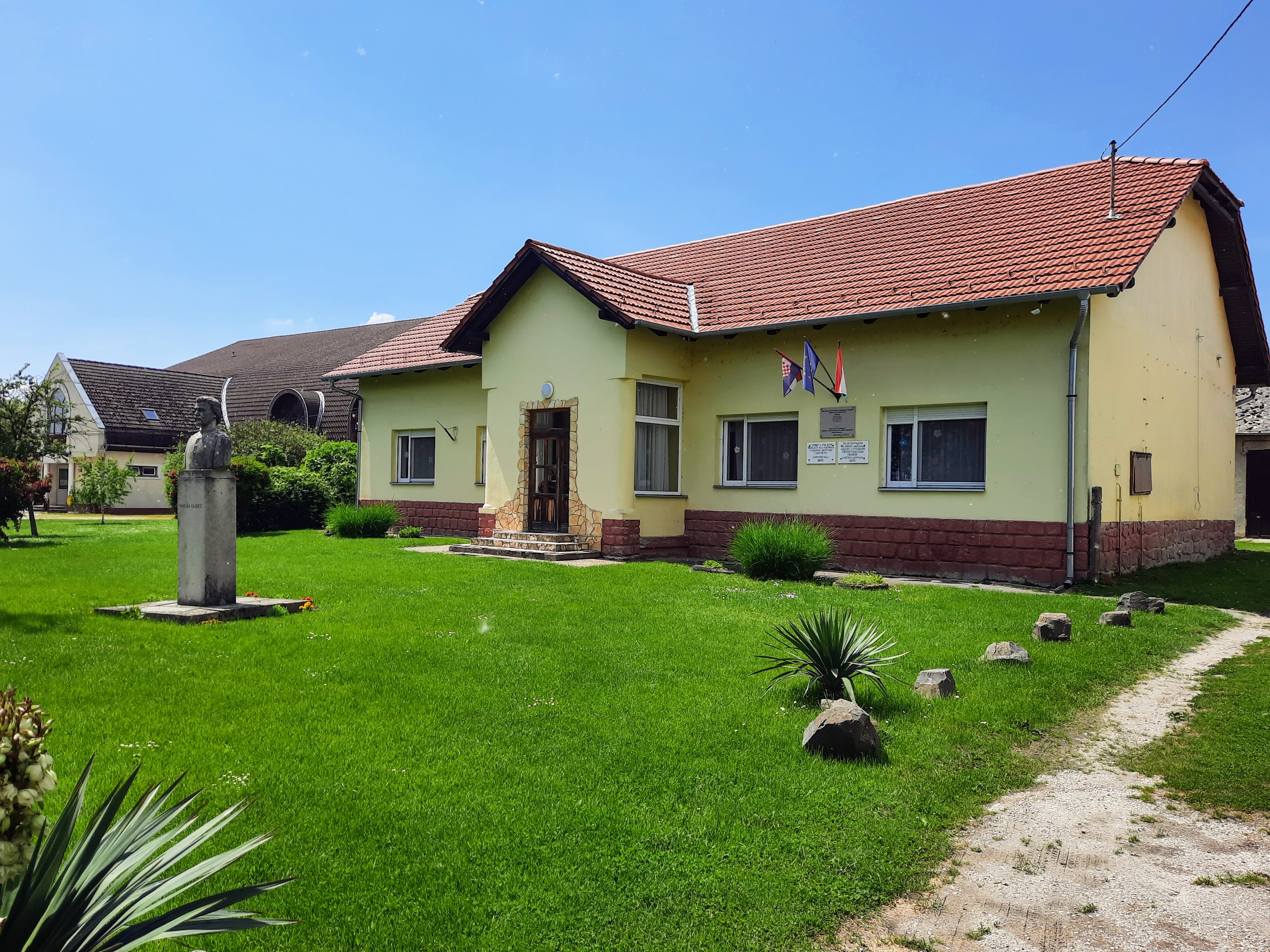
- Town hall
- Interactive map of Felsőszentmárton
- Coordinates: 45°51′N 17°42′E
- Country: Hungary
- County: Baranya
- Time zone: UTC+1 (CET)
  - Summer (DST): UTC+2 (CEST)

Felsőszentmárton (Croatian: Martinci) is a village in Baranya county, Hungary.
