= Csarnóta =

- Village
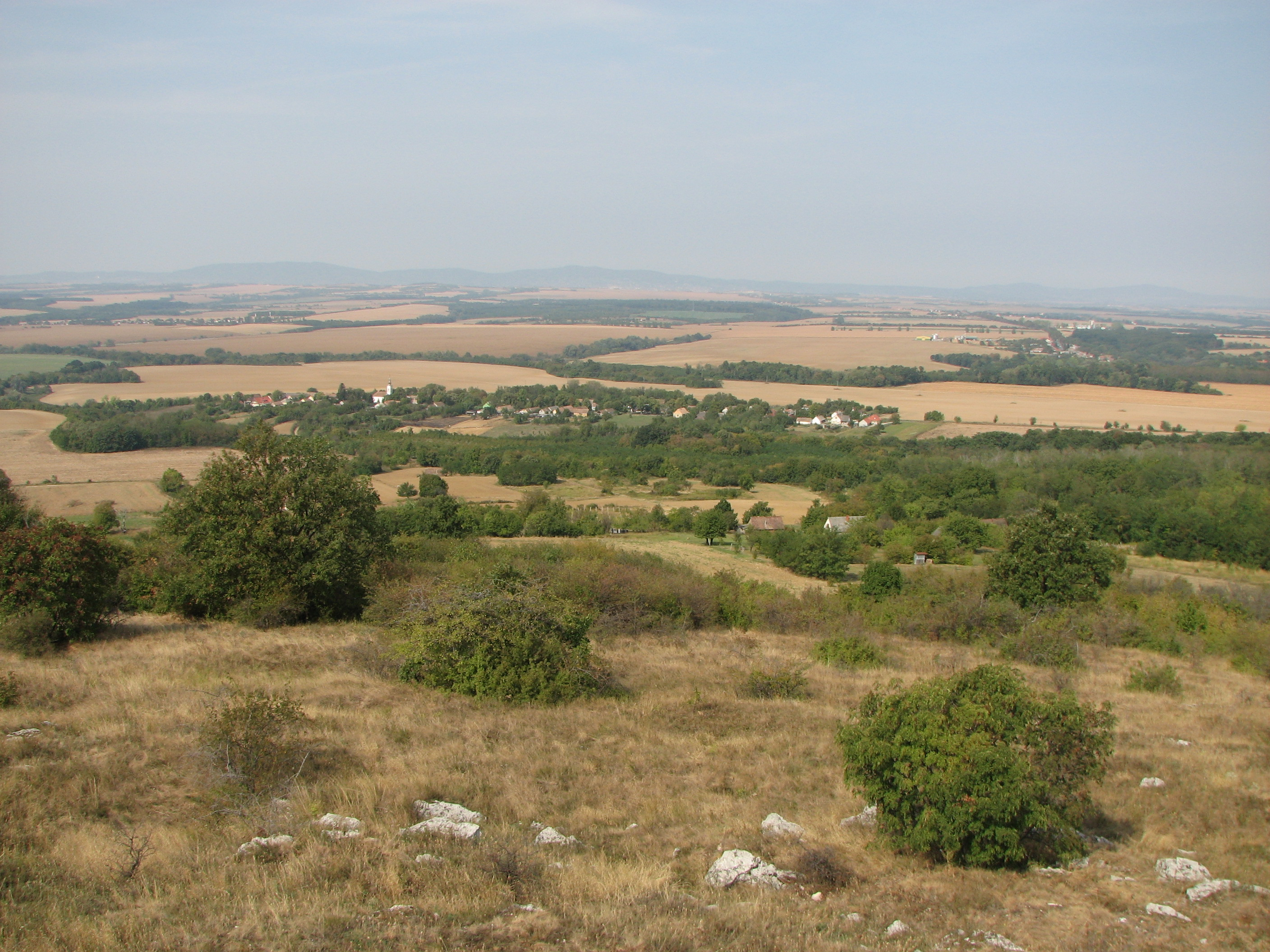
- Csarnóta a Kopasz-hegyről nézve
- Interactive map of Csarnóta
- Coordinates: 45°54′N 18°13′E
- Country: Hungary
- County: Baranya
- Time zone: UTC+1 (CET)
  - Summer (DST): UTC+2 (CEST)

Csarnóta is a village in Baranya county, Hungary.
