= Gilvánfa =

- Village
- Interactive map of Gilvánfa
- Coordinates: 45°55′N 17°58′E
- Country: Hungary
- County: Baranya

Population (2015)
  - Total: 403
- Time zone: UTC+1 (CET)
  - Summer (DST): UTC+2 (CEST)

Gilvánfa is a village in Baranya county, Hungary. The village has a majority Roma population.
