= Tésenfa =

- Village (Falva)
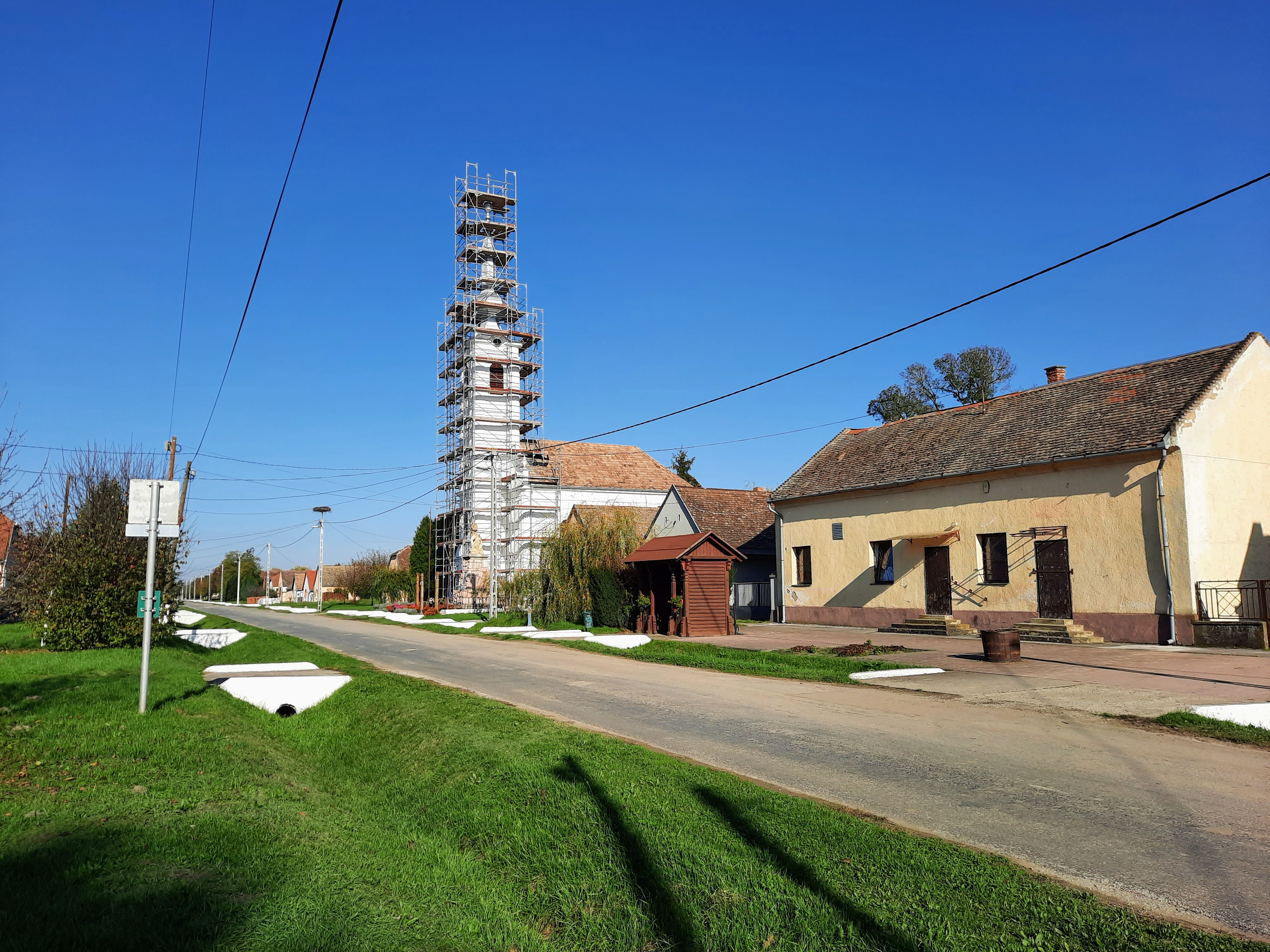
- Interactive map of Tésenfa
- Coordinates: 45°49′N 18°07′E
- Country: Hungary
- County: Baranya
- Time zone: UTC+1 (CET)
  - Summer (DST): UTC+2 (CEST)

Tésenfa is a village in Baranya county, Hungary.
