= Szőke, Hungary =

Szőke
- Village (Falva)
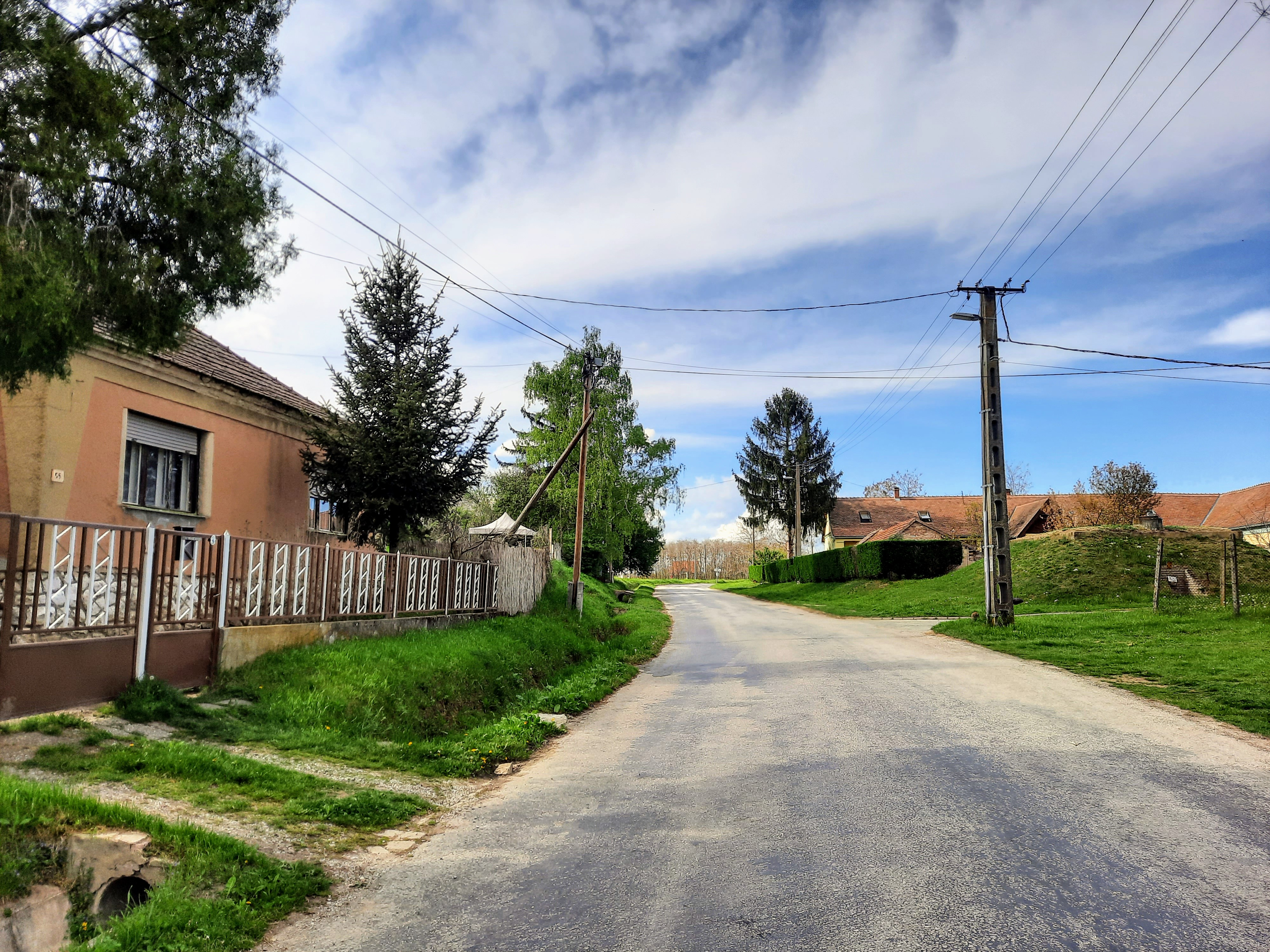
- Interactive map of Szőke
- Coordinates: 45°58′N 18°11′E
- Country: Hungary
- County: Baranya

Population (2025)
  - Total: 120
- Time zone: UTC+1 (CET)
  - Summer (DST): UTC+2 (CEST)

Szőke is a village in Baranya county, Hungary.
