= Drávapalkonya =

- Village
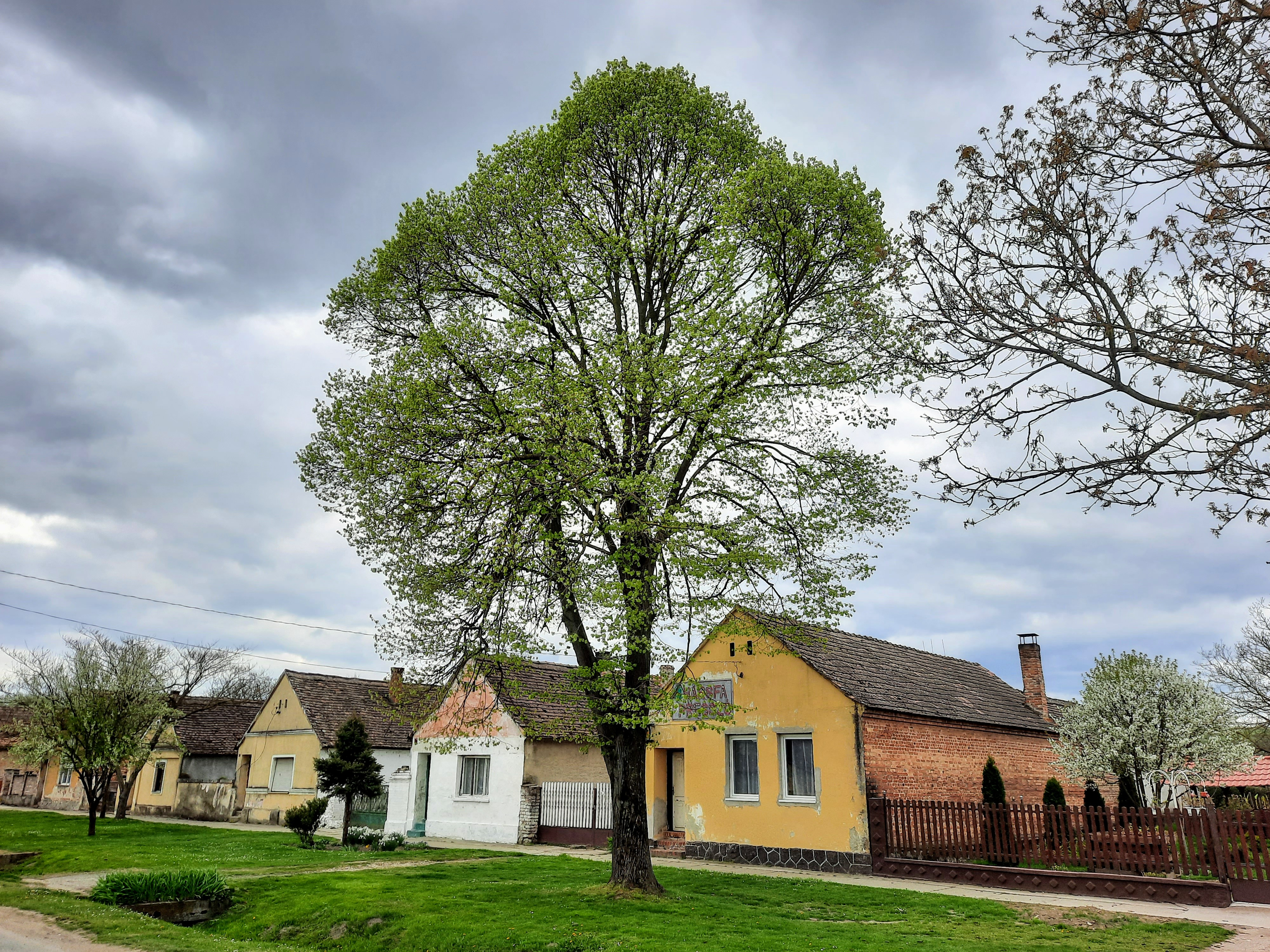
- Interactive map of Drávapalkonya
- Coordinates: 45°48′N 18°11′E
- Country: Hungary
- County: Baranya
- Time zone: UTC+1 (CET)
  - Summer (DST): UTC+2 (CEST)

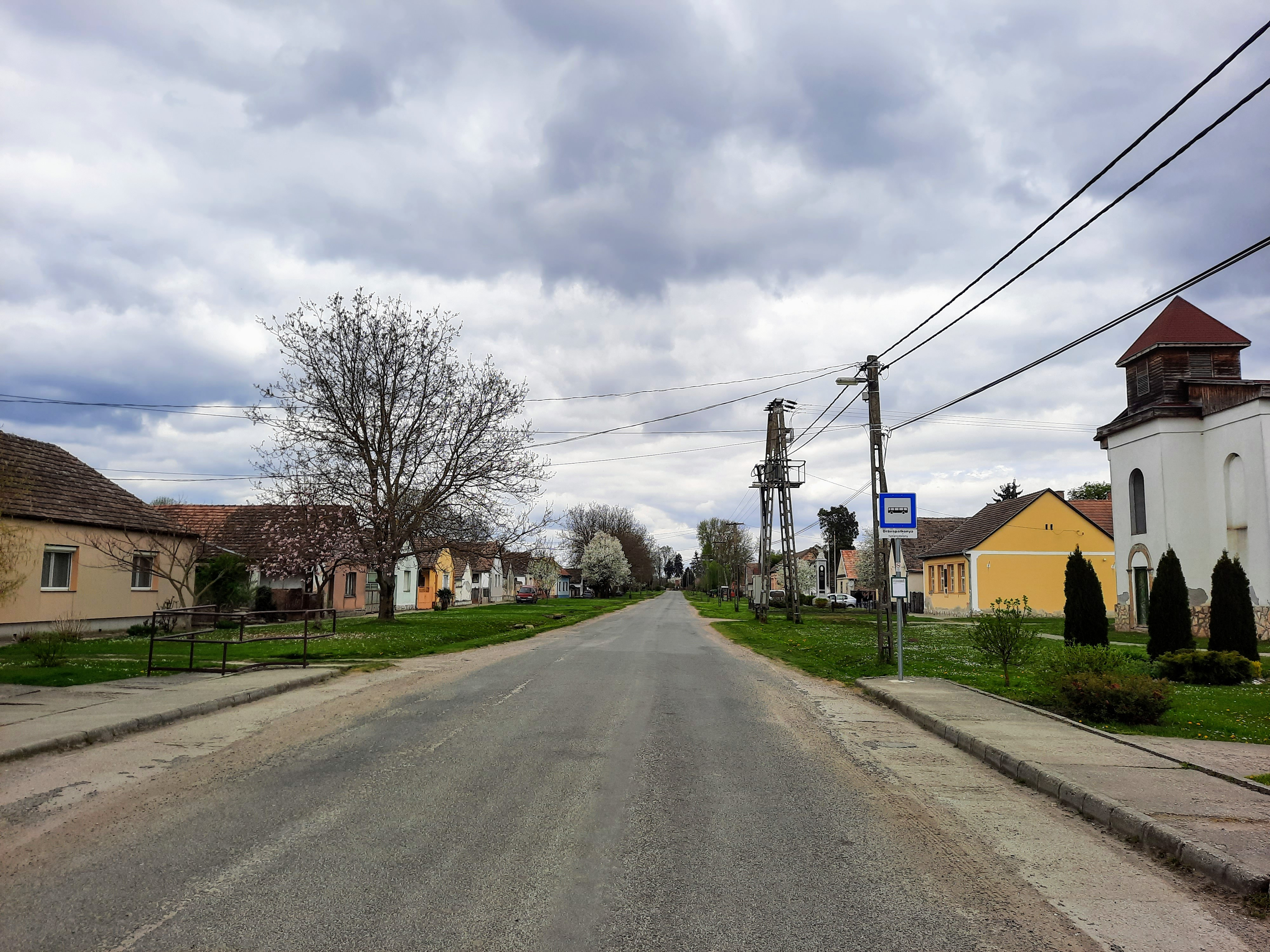
bus stop in Drávapalkonya

Drávapalkonya is a village in Baranya county, Hungary.
