= Lúzsok =

Luzsok
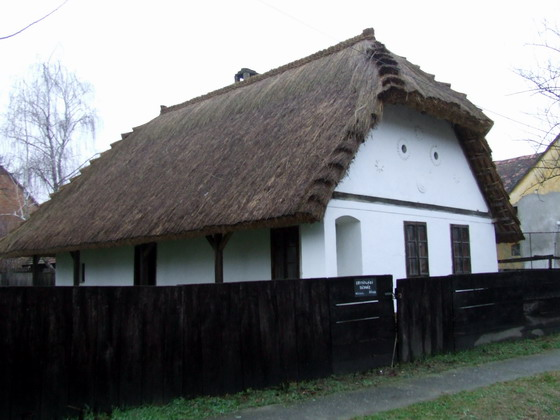

- Location of Baranya county in Hungary

- Location of Lúzsok
- Coordinates: 45.83951°N 17.94633°E
- Country: Hungary
- County: Baranya

Area
  - Total: 6.52 km^{2} (2.52 sq mi)

Population (2015)
  - Total: 257
  - Density: 39.4/km^{2} (102/sq mi)
- Time zone: UTC+1 (CET)
  - Summer (DST): UTC+2 (CEST)
- Postal code: 7838
- Area code: 73

Lúzsok is a village in Baranya county, Hungary.

== The Village ==
Lúzsok is a large municipality with 1,956 inhabitants in the Ormánság region. There is a Roman Catholic church from 1779. The Baroque-style Reformed Church was built in 1785. The János Kodolányi Memorial Museum, that is located in the village, along with a forestry office, showcases the writer's career.
