= Tótszentgyörgy =

- Village (Falva)
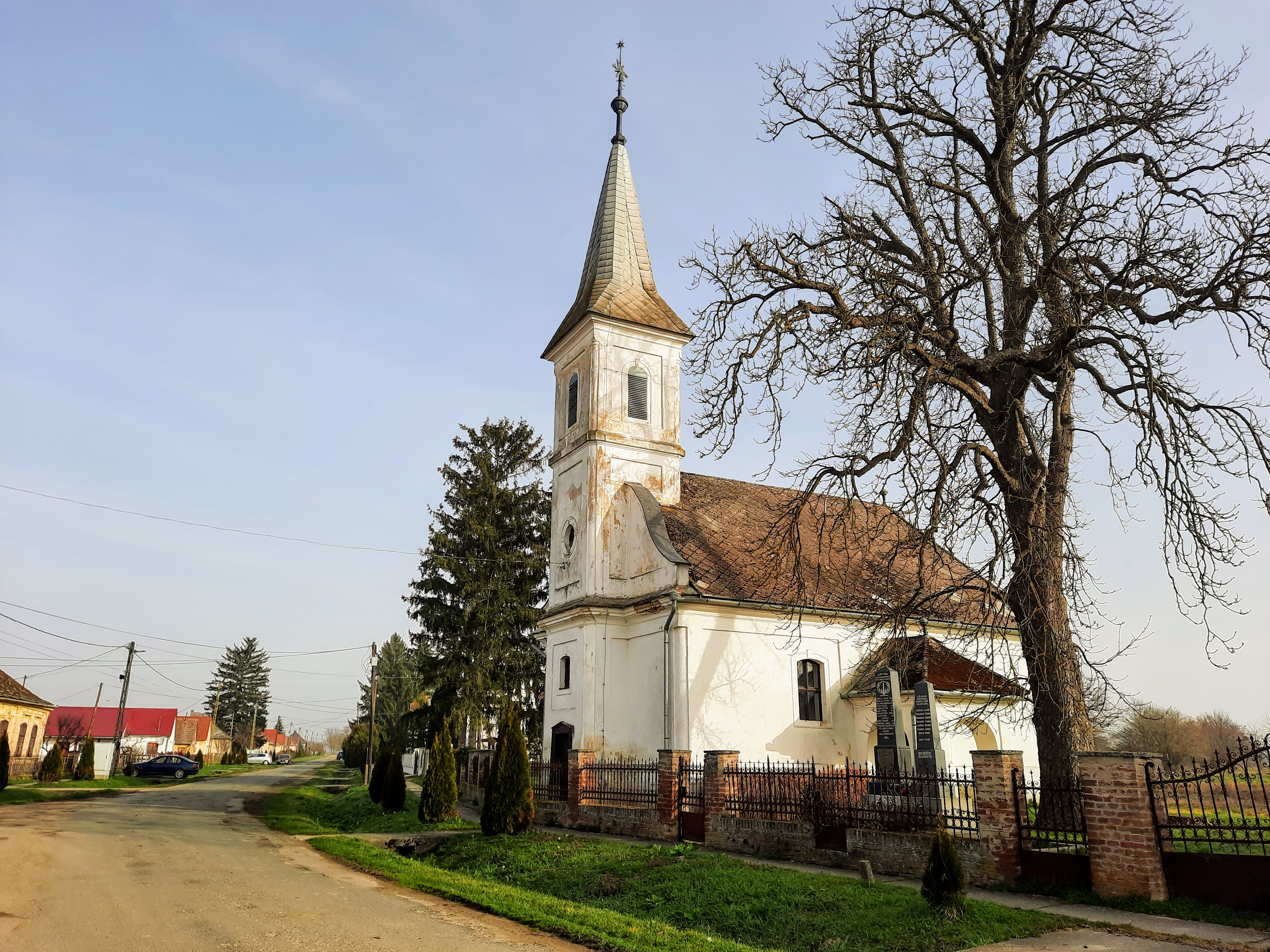
- Interactive map of Tótszentgyörgy
- Coordinates: 46°03′07″N 17°43′03″E
- Country: Hungary
- County: Baranya

Population (2025)
  - Total: 127
- Time zone: UTC+1 (CET)
  - Summer (DST): UTC+2 (CEST)

Tótszentgyörgy is a village in Baranya county, Hungary.
