= Kisasszonyfa =

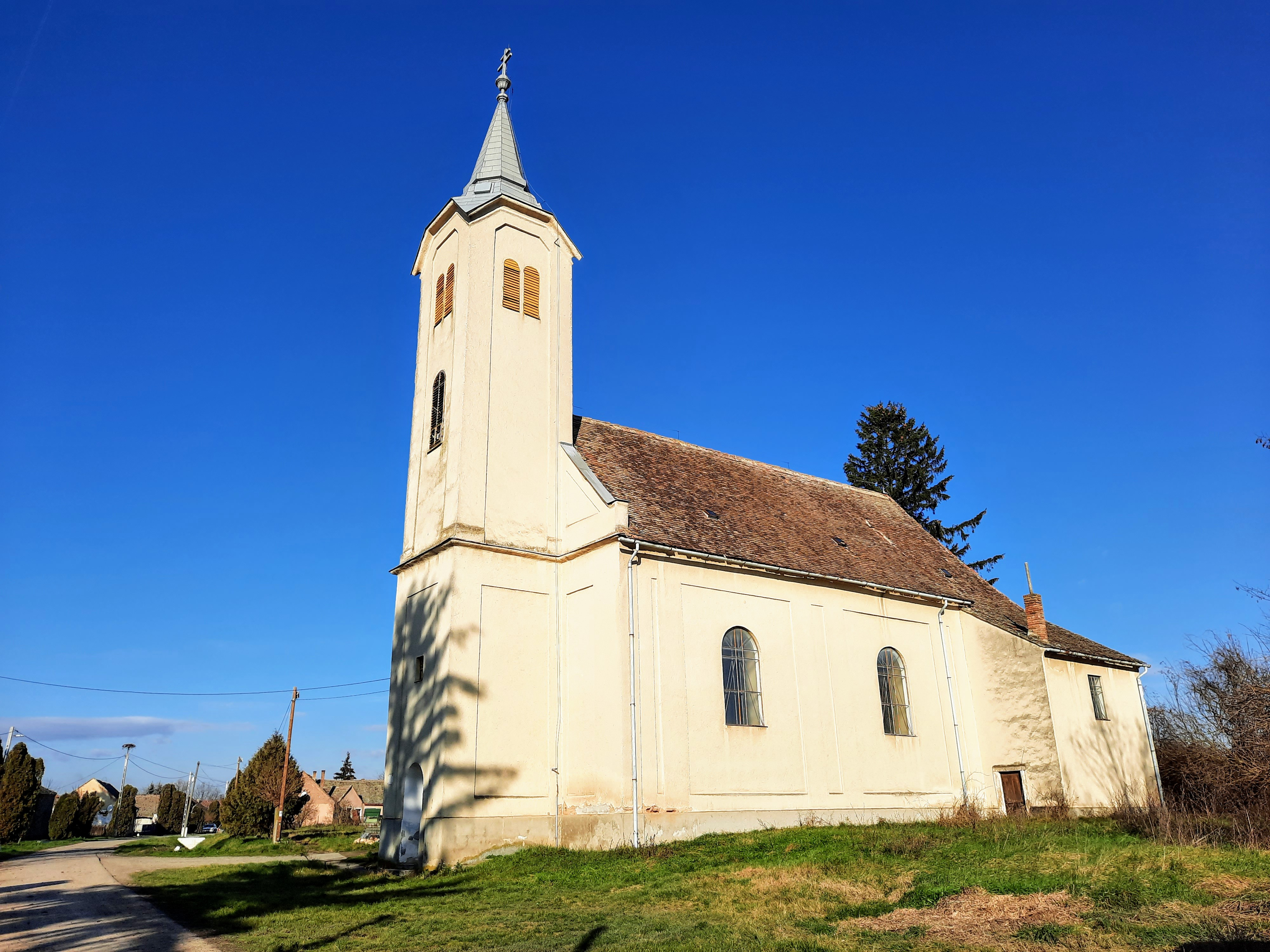

- Location of Baranya county in Hungary

- Location of Kisasszonyfa
- Coordinates: 45.94620°N 18.00773°E
- Country: Hungary
- County: Baranya

Government
  - Mayor: Bite Gyula (Ind.)

Area
  - Total: 8.87 km^{2} (3.42 sq mi)

Population (2022)
  - Total: 175
  - Density: 19.7/km^{2} (51.1/sq mi)
- Time zone: UTC+1 (CET)
  - Summer (DST): UTC+2 (CEST)
- Postal code: 7954
- Area code: 73

Kisasszonyfa is a village in Baranya county, Hungary.
