= Regenye =

- Village (Falva)
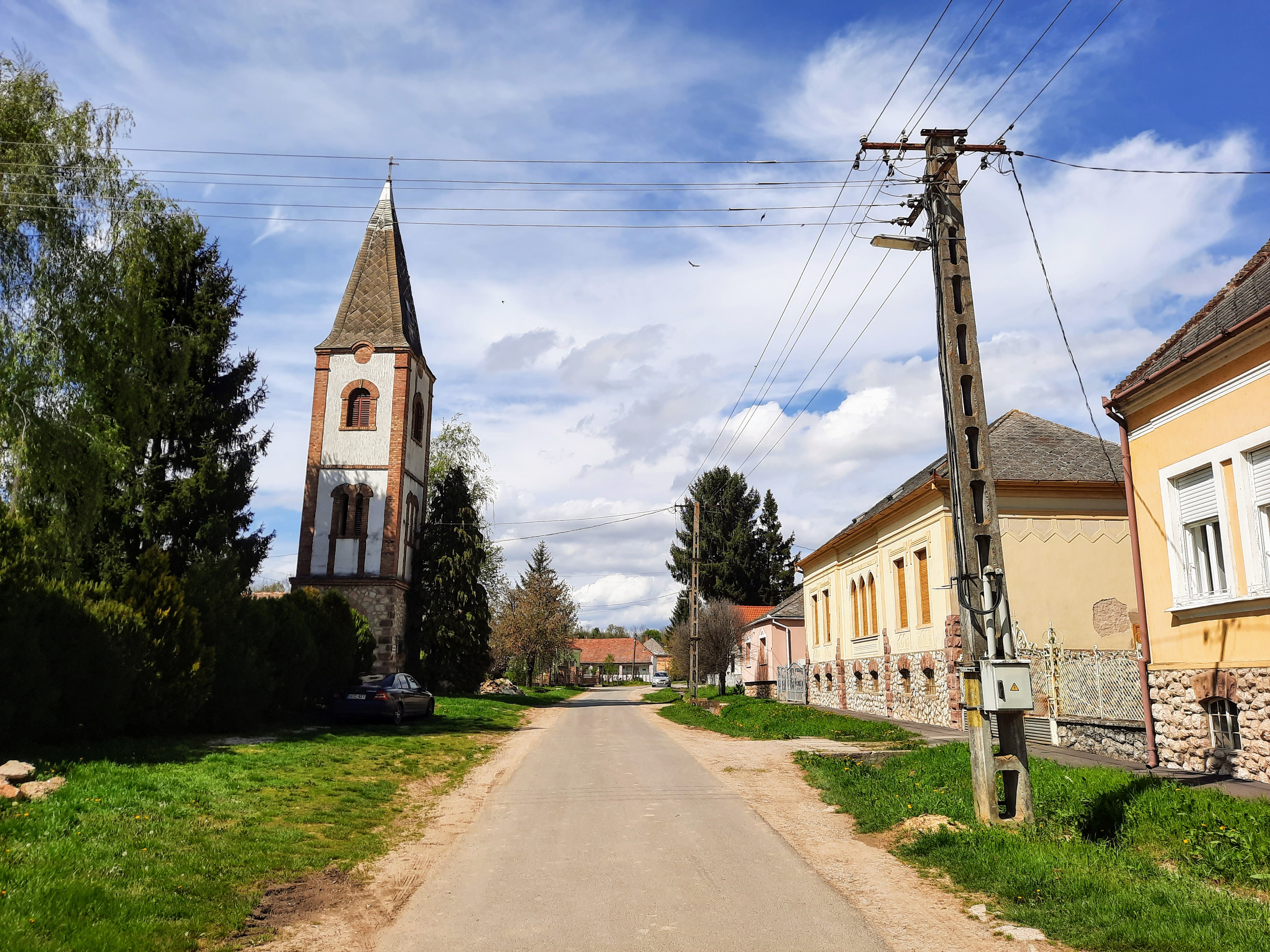

- Location of Baranya county in Hungary

- Location of Regenye
- Coordinates: 45.96988°N 18.16957°E
- Country: Hungary
- County: Baranya

Area
  - Total: 6.15 km^{2} (2.37 sq mi)

Population (2004)
  - Total: 171
  - Density: 27.8/km^{2} (72/sq mi)
- Time zone: UTC+1 (CET)
  - Summer (DST): UTC+2 (CEST)
- Postal code: 7833
- Area code: 72

Regenye (Croatian: Reginja, Reginja) is a village in Baranya county, Hungary.
