= Gordisa =

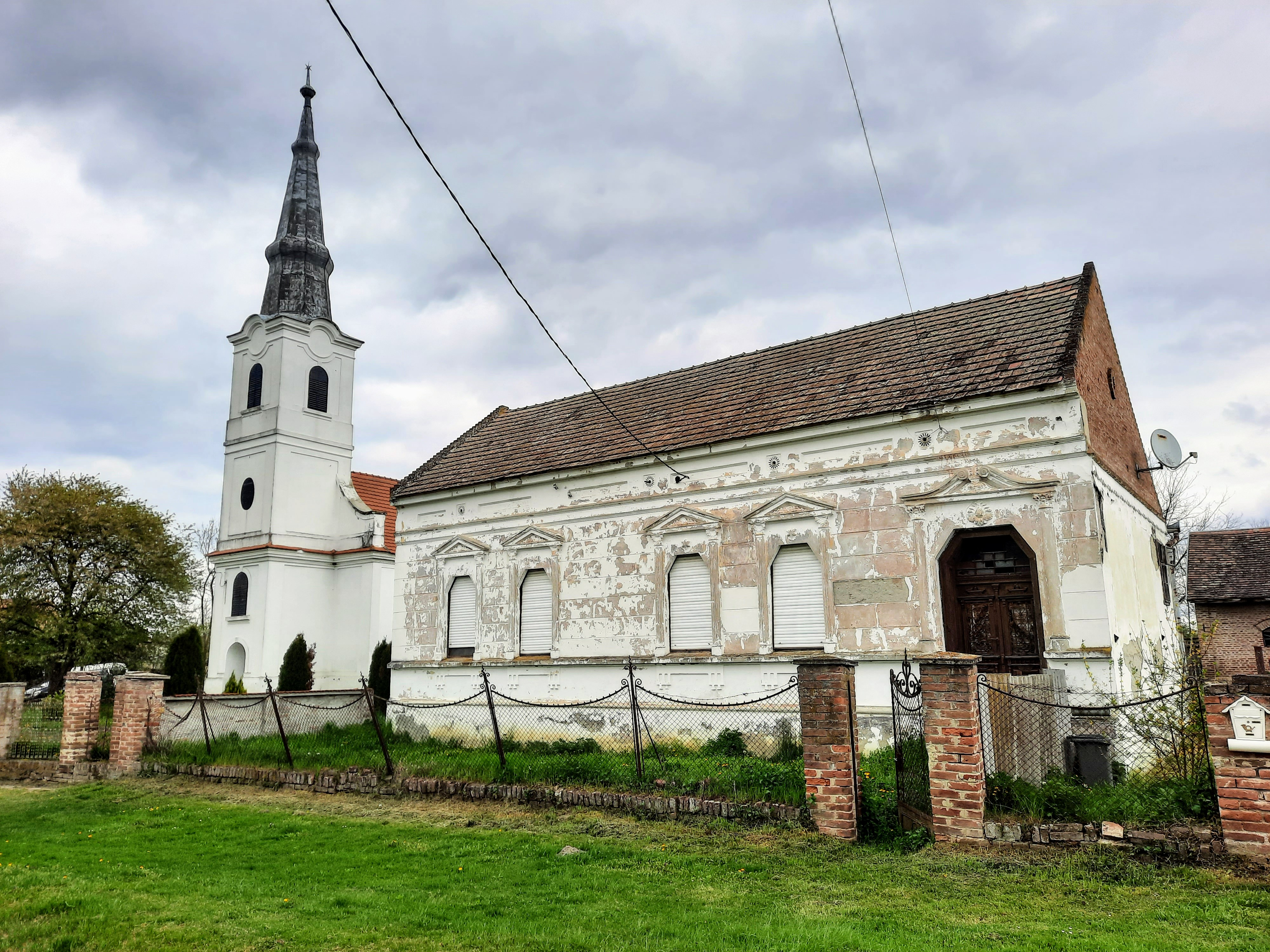

- Coat of arms

- Location of Baranya county in Hungary

- Location of Gordisa
- Coordinates: 45.79832°N 18.23888°E
- Country: Hungary
- County: Baranya

Area
  - Total: 10.88 km^{2} (4.20 sq mi)

Population (2015)
  - Total: 274
  - Density: 25.2/km^{2} (65.2/sq mi)
- Time zone: UTC+1 (CET)
  - Summer (DST): UTC+2 (CEST)
- Postal code: 7853
- Area code: 72

Gordisa is a village in Baranya county, Hungary, located near the Croatian border.
