= Dinnyeberki =

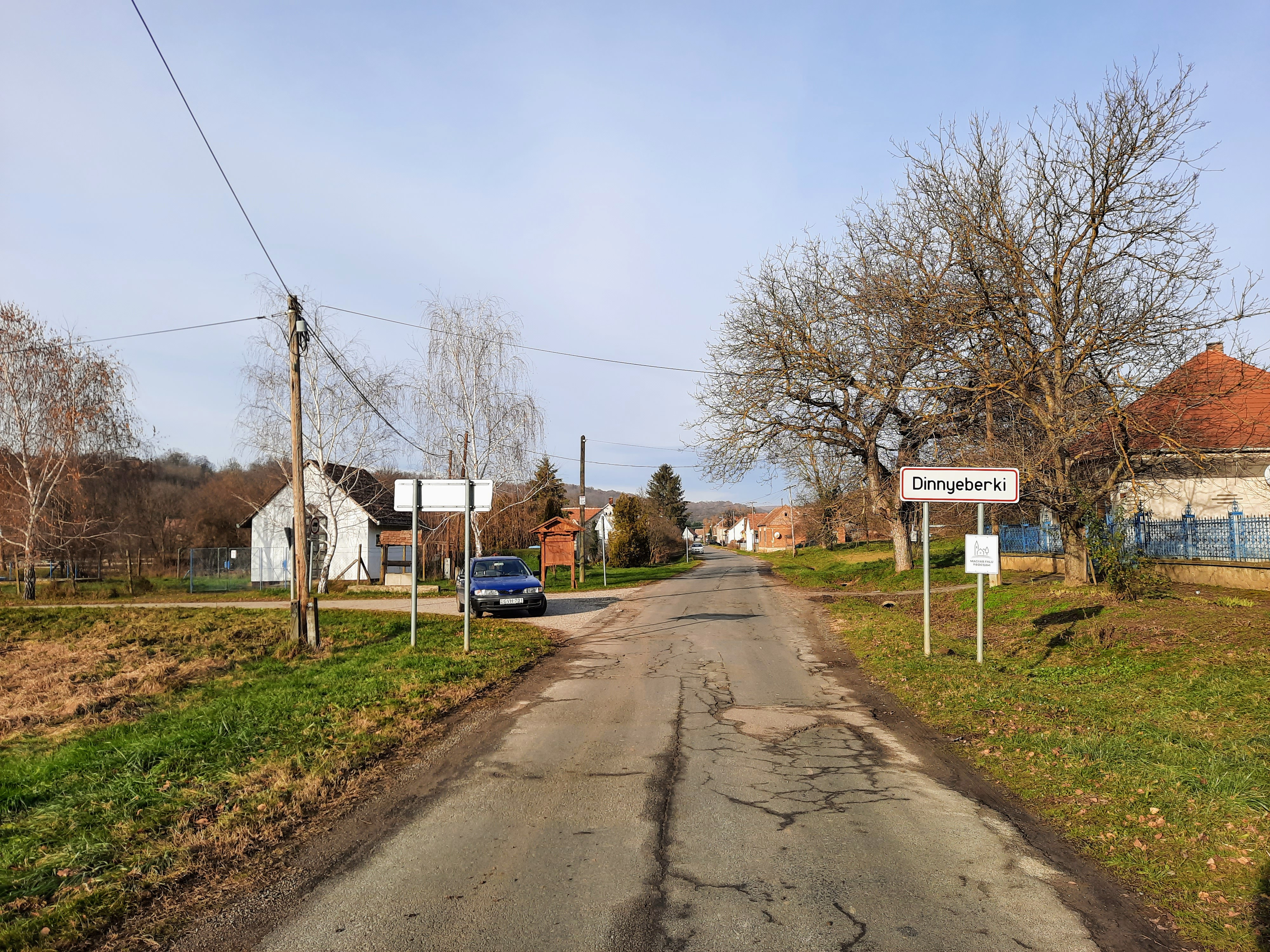

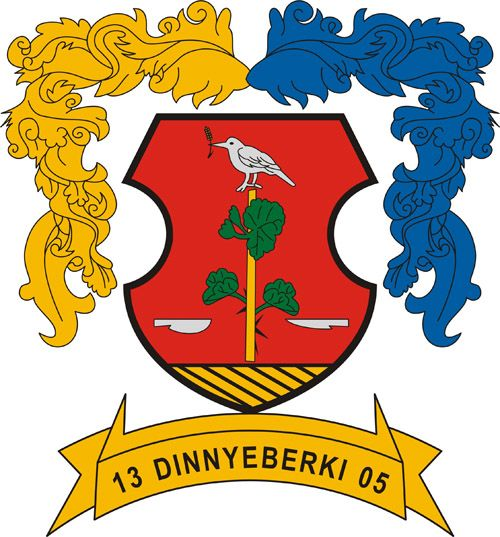
- Seal

- Location of Baranya county in Hungary

- Location of Dinnyeberki
- Coordinates: 46.09890°N 17.95778°E
- Country: Hungary
- County: Baranya

Area
  - Total: 8.58 km^{2} (3.31 sq mi)

Population (2004)
  - Total: 106
  - Density: 12.35/km^{2} (32.0/sq mi)
- Time zone: UTC+1 (CET)
  - Summer (DST): UTC+2 (CEST)
- Postal code: 7683
- Area code: 73

Dinnyeberki (Croatian: Breka) is a village in Baranya county, Hungary.
