= Helesfa =

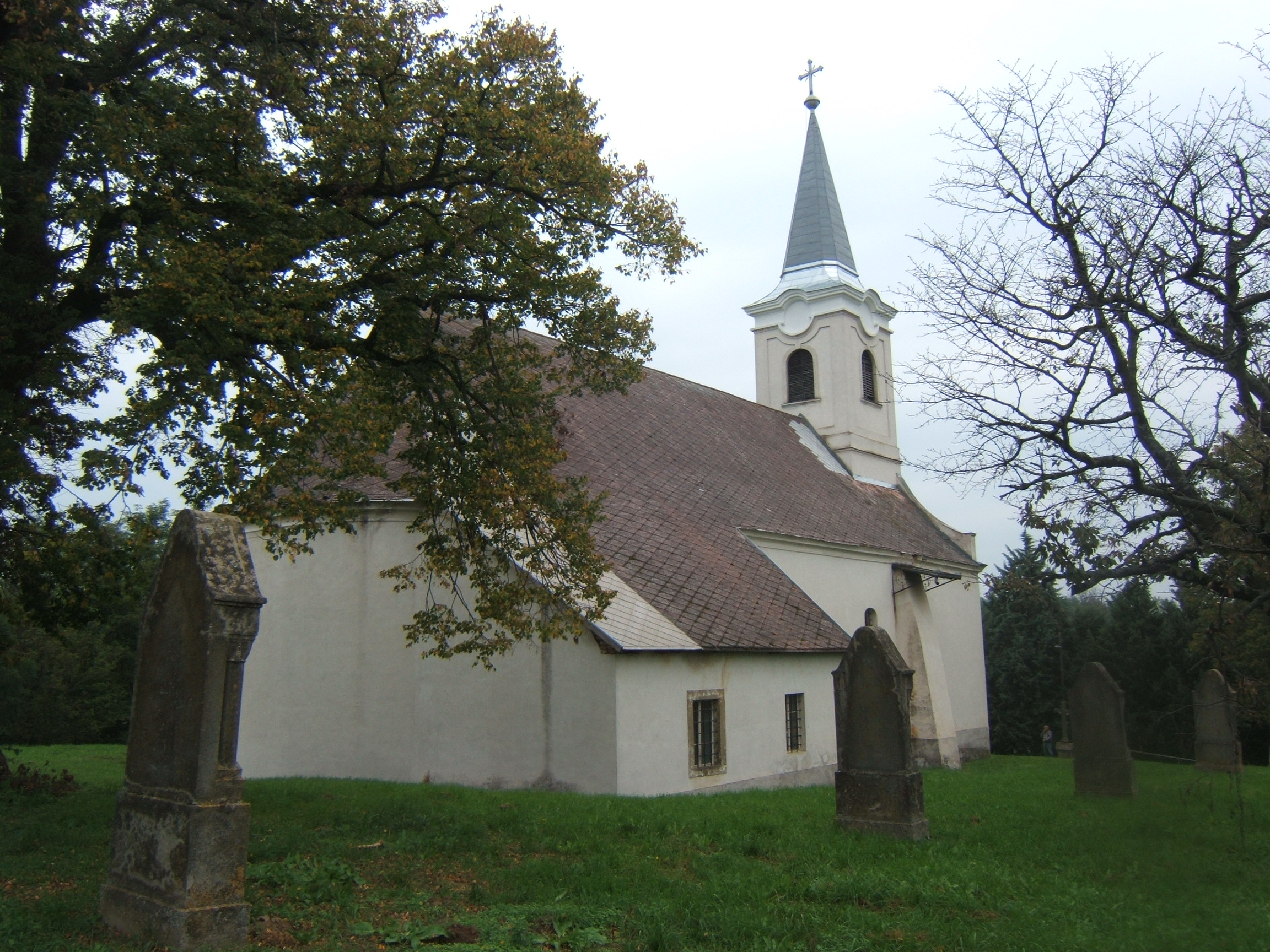

- Location of Baranya county in Hungary

- Location of Helesfa
- Coordinates: 46.09013°N 17.97843°E
- Country: Hungary
- County: Baranya

Area
  - Total: 9.87 km^{2} (3.81 sq mi)

Population (2004)
  - Total: 568
  - Density: 57.54/km^{2} (149.0/sq mi)
- Time zone: UTC+1 (CET)
  - Summer (DST): UTC+2 (CEST)
- Postal code: 7683
- Area code: 73

Helesfa (Croatian: Eleš) is a village in Baranya county, Hungary.
