= Besence =

- Village
- Coat of arms

- Location of Besence
- Coordinates: 45.89549°N 17.96595°E
- Country: Hungary
- County: Baranya

Area
  - Total: 9.58 km^{2} (3.70 sq mi)

Population (2023)
  - Total: 95
  - Density: 15.97/km^{2} (41.4/sq mi)
- Time zone: UTC+1 (CET)
  - Summer (DST): UTC+2 (CEST)
- Postal code: 7838
- Area code: 73

Besence (Croatian: Bešenca) is a village in Baranya county, Hungary.

== Demographics ==
The village has a significant Gypsy population. As of 2022, the town was 66.7% Hungarian, 18.8% Gypsy, and 2.1% German. The population was 24% Roman Catholic, and 6.3% Reformed.
