= Kisdér =

- Village
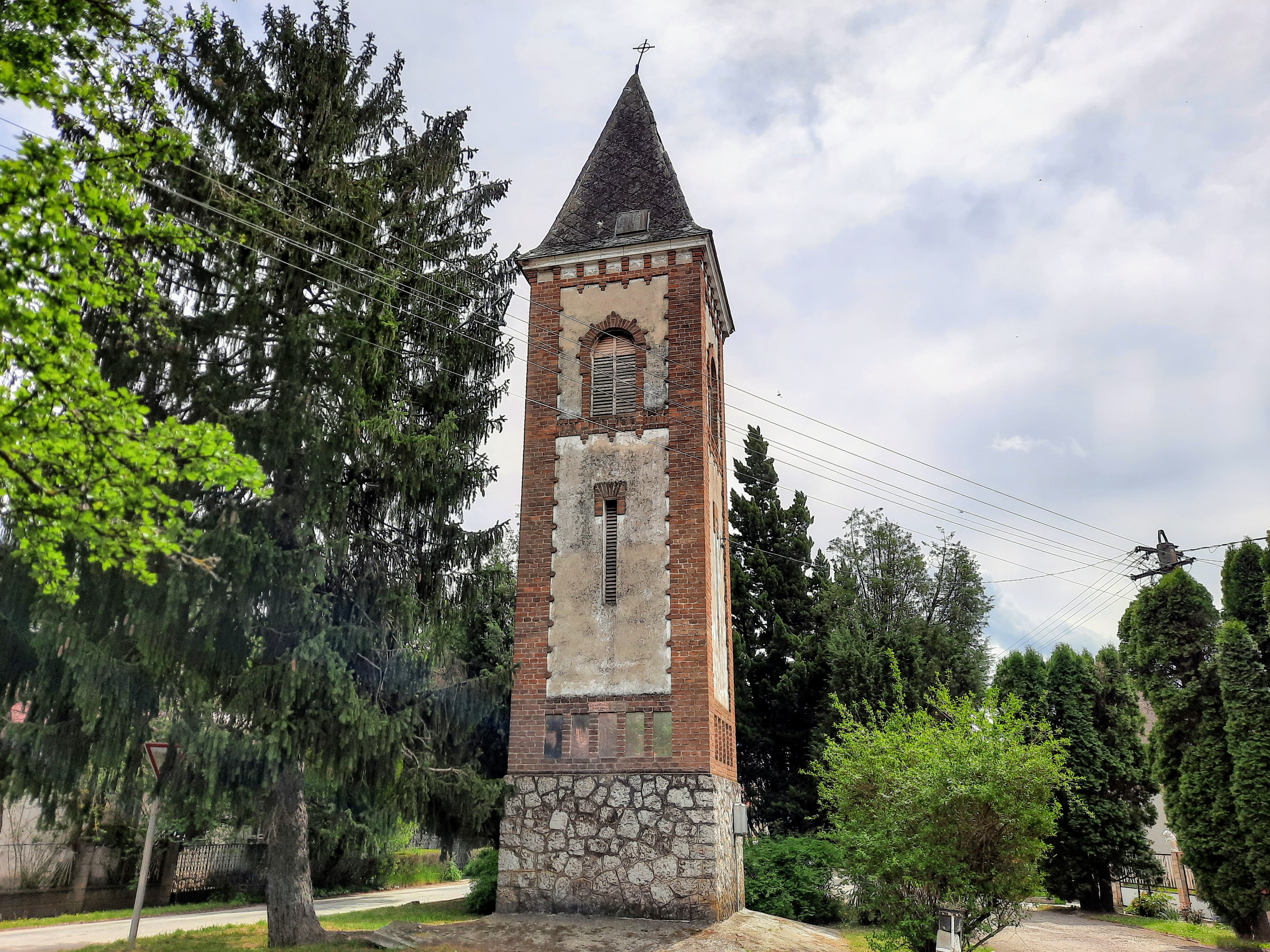

- Location of Kisdér
- Coordinates: 45°56′27″N 18°07′41″E
- Country: Hungary
- County: Baranya

Area
  - Total: 1.69 sq mi (4.37 km^{2})

Population (2025)
  - Total: 114
  - Density: 67.6/sq mi (26.1/km^{2})
- Time zone: UTC+1 (CET)
  - Summer (DST): UTC+2 (CEST)

Kisdér is a village in Baranya county, Hungary.
