= Baranyahídvég =

- Village
- Flag Coat of arms
- Interactive map of Baranyahídvég
- Coordinates: 45°51′N 18°01′E
- Country: Hungary
- County: Baranya

Area
  - Total: 3.28 sq mi (8.49 km^{2})

Population (2015)
  - Total: 178
  - Density: 54.3/sq mi (21.0/km^{2})
- Time zone: UTC+1 (CET)
  - Summer (DST): UTC+2 (CEST)

Baranyahídvég is a village in Baranya county, Hungary.
