= Kovácshida =

- Village
- Interactive map of Kovácshida
- Coordinates: 45°50′N 18°11′E
- Country: Hungary
- County: Baranya

Population (2025)
  - Total: 202
- Time zone: UTC+1 (CET)
  - Summer (DST): UTC+2 (CEST)

Kovácshida is a village in Baranya county, Hungary.
