= Kistamási =

- Village
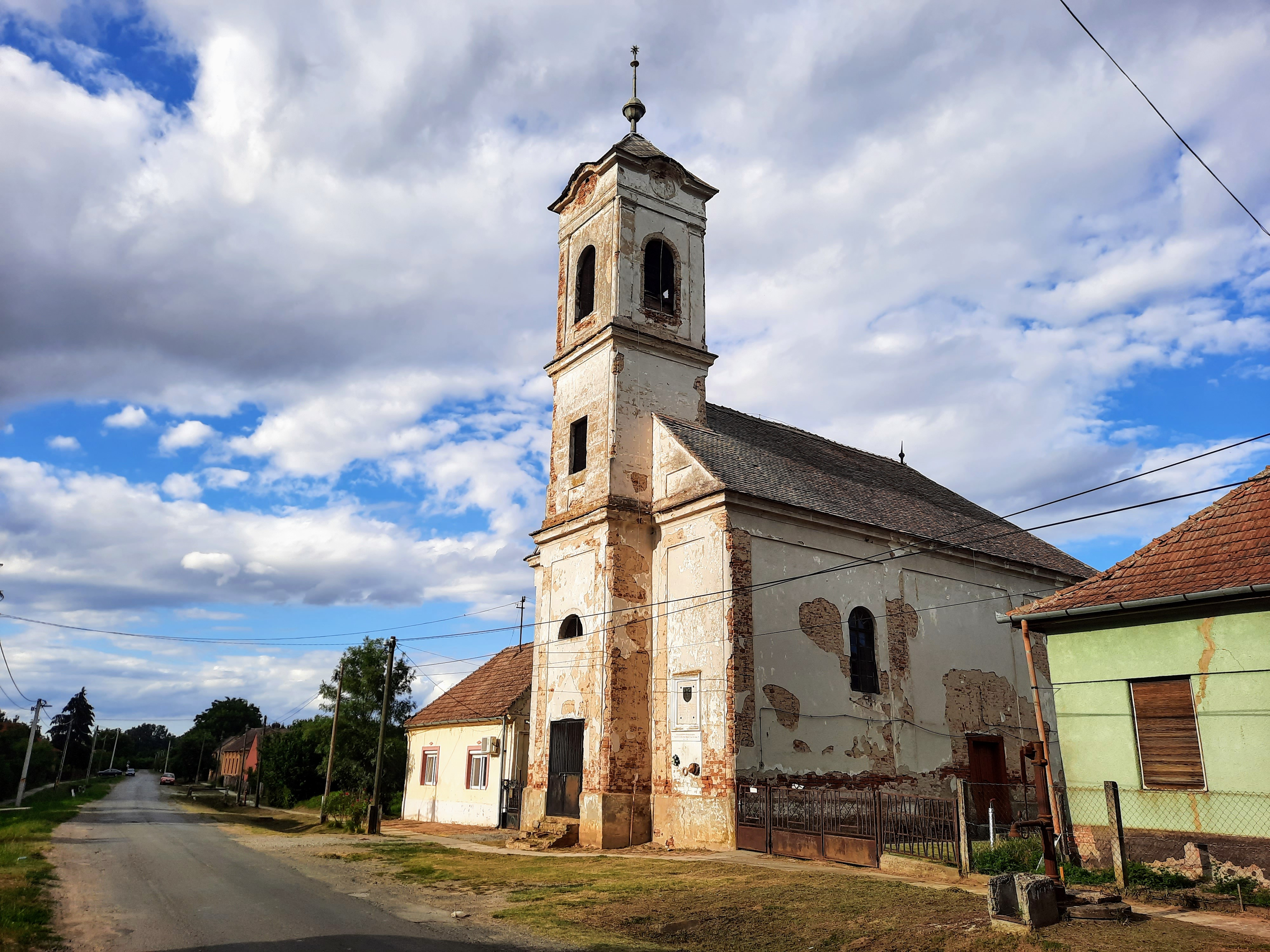
- Interactive map of Kistamási
- Coordinates: 46°01′N 17°44′E
- Country: Hungary
- County: Baranya

Population (2025)
  - Total: 111
- Time zone: UTC+1 (CET)
  - Summer (DST): UTC+2 (CEST)

Kistamási is a village in Baranya county, Hungary.
