= Baranya County 3rd constituency =

Constituency in Hungary (2012-)

Coordinates: 45°59′45″N 18°40′47″E

Baranya County 3rd constituency (Mohács)
- Constituency for the National Assembly
- Location of Baranya county 03 within Baranya county

- Location of Baranya county within Hungary
- County: Baranya
- Electorate: 71,985 (2018)
- Major settlements: Mohács

Current constituency
- Created: 2011
- Party: Tisza Party
- Member: Áron Rózsahegyi
- Elected: 2026

The 3rd constituency of Baranya County (Hungarian: Baranya megyei 03. számú országgyűlési egyéni választókerület) is one of the single member constituencies of the National Assembly, the national legislature of Hungary. The constituency standard abbreviation: Baranya 03. OEVK.

Since 2026, it has been represented by Áron Rózsahegyi of the Tisza Party.

== Geography ==
The 3rd constituency is located in eastern part of Baranya County.

=== List of municipalities ===
The constituency includes the following municipalities:

1. Ág
2. Alsómocsolád
3. Apátvarasd
4. Babarc
5. Bár
6. Belvárdgyula
7. Beremend
8. Bezedek
9. Bikal
10. Birján
11. Bóly
12. Borjád
13. Dunaszekcső
14. Egerág
15. Egyházasharaszti
16. Egyházaskozár
17. Erdősmárok
18. Erdősmecske
19. Erzsébet
20. Fazekasboda
21. Feked
22. Geresdlak
23. Görcsönydoboka
24. Hegyhátmaróc
25. Hidas
26. Himesháza
27. Homorúd
28. Hosszúhetény
29. Illocska
30. Ivánbattyán
31. Ivándárda
32. Kárász
33. Kásád
34. Kátoly
35. Kékesd
36. Kisbudmér
37. Kisharsány
38. Kisherend
39. Kisjakabfalva
40. Kiskassa
41. Kislippó
42. Kisnyárád
43. Kistapolca
44. Köblény
45. Kölked
46. Lánycsók
47. Lapáncsa
48. Lippó
49. Liptód
50. Lovászhetény
51. Mágocs
52. Magyarbóly
53. Magyaregregy
54. Majs
55. Maráza
56. Máriakéménd
57. Márok
58. Martonfa
59. Máza
60. Mecseknádasd
61. Mekényes
62. Mohács
63. Monyoród
64. Nagybudmér
65. Nagyhajmás
66. Nagyharsány
67. Nagynyárád
68. Nagypall
69. Nagytótfalu
70. Olasz
71. Old
72. Óbánya
73. Ófalu
74. Palkonya
75. Palotabozsok
76. Pécsdevecser
77. Pécsvárad
78. Peterd
79. Pócsa
80. Sárok
81. Sátorhely
82. Siklósnagyfalu
83. Somberek
84. Szajk
85. Szalatnak
86. Szárász
87. Szászvár
88. Szebény
89. Szederkény
90. Székelyszabar
91. Szellő
92. Szőkéd
93. Szűr
94. Tófű
95. Töttös
96. Udvar
97. Újpetre
98. Vékény
99. Véménd
100. Versend
101. Villány
102. Villánykövesd
103. Vokány
104. Zengővárkony

== Members ==
The constituency was first represented by János Hargitai of the KDNP from 2014, and he was re-elected in 2018 and 2022. In the 2026 election, Áron Rózsahegyi of the Tisza Party was elected representative.

Election	Member	Party	%	Ref.
2014	János Hargitai	KDNP	50.26	
2018	János Hargitai	KDNP	57.62	
2022	János Hargitai	KDNP	60.44	
2026	Áron Rózsahegyi	Tisza Party	48.43	
