= Siklós District =

Coordinates: 45.852099721317565°N 18.29869923445231°E

Siklós District Siklósi járás
- Districts of Hungary
- Coat of arms

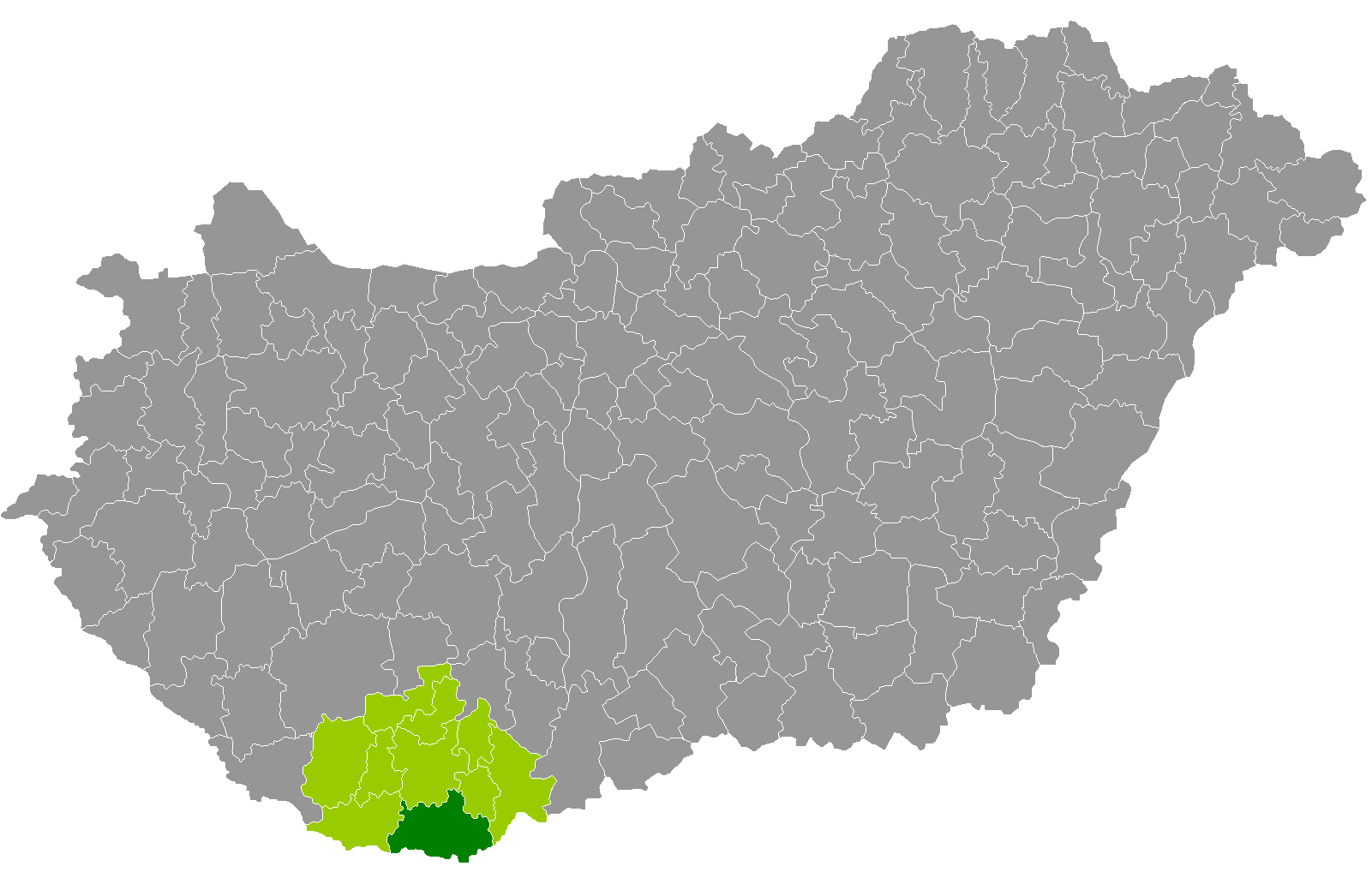
- Siklós District within Hungary and Baranya County.
- Country: Hungary
- County: Baranya
- District seat: Siklós

Area
  - Total: 652.99 km^{2} (252.12 sq mi)
  - Rank: 2nd in Baranya

Population (2011 census)
  - Total: 35,929
  - Rank: 2nd in Baranya
  - Density: 55/km^{2} (140/sq mi)

Siklós (Hungarian: Siklósi járás) is a district in southern part of Baranya County, Hungary. Siklós is also the name of the town where the district seat is located. The district is in the Southern Transdanubia Statistical Region.

== Geography ==
Siklós District borders with Pécs and Bóly districts to the north, Mohács District to the east, the Croatian county of Osijek-Baranja to the south, and Sellye District to the west. The number of inhabited places in Siklós District is 53.

== Municipalities ==
The district has 3 towns, 1 large village and 49 villages. (ordered by population, as of 1 January 2012)

- Alsószentmárton (1,177)
- Babarcszőlős (96)
- Beremend (2,594)
- Bisse (228)
- Csarnóta (150)
- Cún (242)
- Diósviszló (702)
- Drávacsehi (214)
- Drávacsepely (201)
- Drávapalkonya (249)
- Drávapiski (112)
- Drávaszabolcs (703)
- Drávaszerdahely (188)
- Egyházasharaszti (323)
- Garé (295)
- Gordisa (314)
- **Harkány** (4,065)
- Illocska (240)
- Ipacsfa (187)
- Ivánbattyán (120)
- Kásád (299)
- Kémes (471)
- Kisdér (127)
- Kisharsány (550)
- Kisjakabfalva (118)
- Kiskassa (256)
- Kislippó (280)
- Kistapolca (191)
- Kistótfalu (324)
- Kovácshida (262)
- Lapáncsa (201)
- Magyarbóly (948)
- Matty (332)
- Márfa (209)
- Márok (431)
- Nagyharsány (1,570)
- Nagytótfalu (389)
- Old (336)
- Palkonya (271)
- Peterd (197)
- Pécsdevecser (96)
- Rádfalva (179)
- **Siklós** (9,631) – district seat
- Siklósbodony (128)
- Siklósnagyfalu (445)
- Szaporca (249)
- Szava (350)
- Tésenfa (167)
- Túrony (249)
- Újpetre (1,033)
- **Villány** (2,474)
- Villánykövesd (277)
- Vokány (817)

The bolded municipalities are cities, italics municipality is large village.

== See also ==
- List of cities and towns in Hungary
