= Áron Rózsahegyi =

Hungarian politician

Member of the National Assembly
- Assuming office 9 May 2026
- Succeeding: János Hargitai
- Constituency: Baranya 3rd

Personal details
- Party: Tisza

Áron Rózsahegyi is a Hungarian politician who was elected member of the National Assembly in 2026 representing the Baranya County 3rd constituency. He previously worked self-employed.
