= Nagypall =

Nagypall Pahl
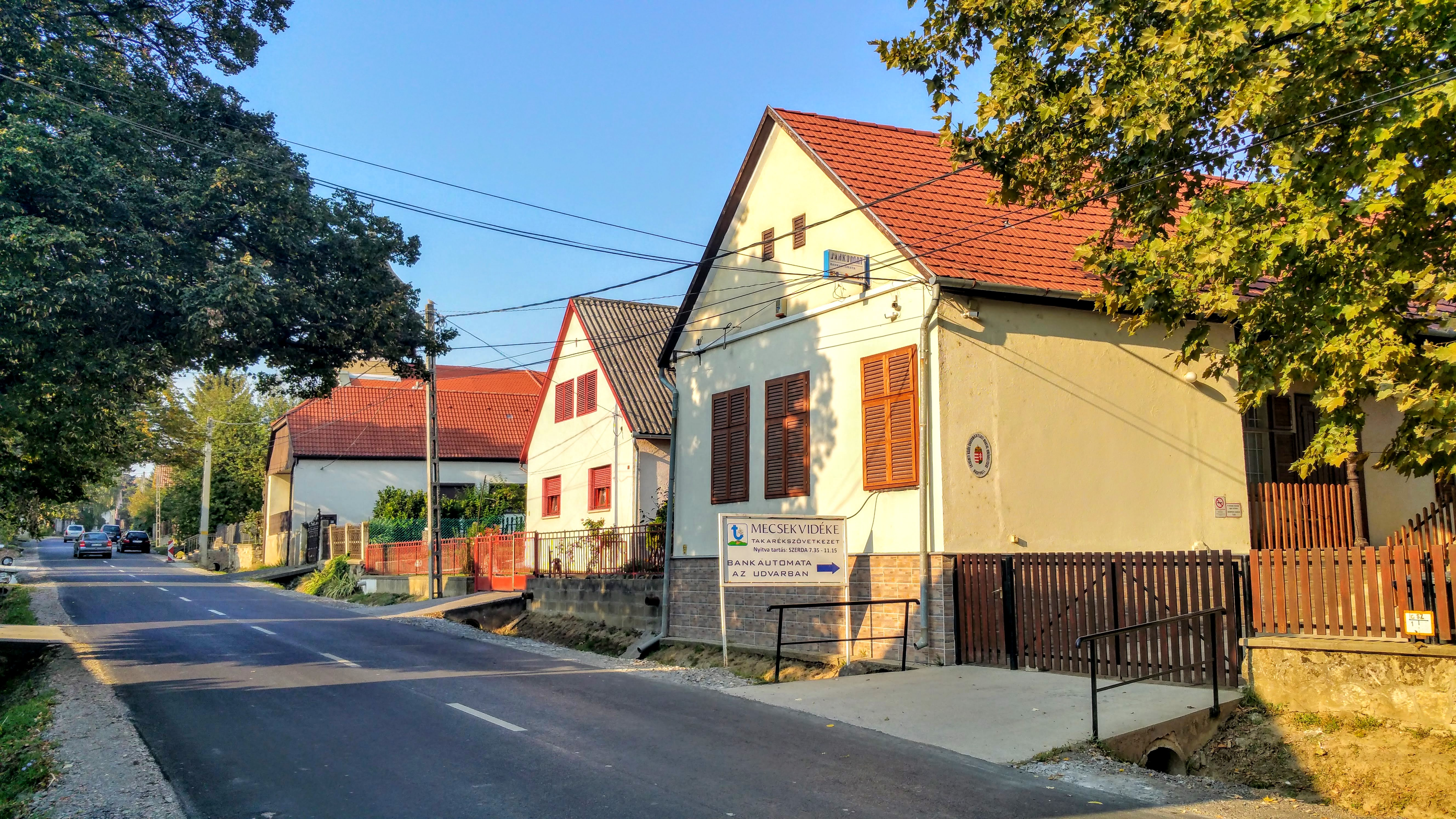

- Location of Baranya county in Hungary

- Location of Nagypall
- Coordinates: 46.14678°N 18.45505°E
- Country: Hungary
- County: Baranya

Area
  - Total: 7.13 km^{2} (2.75 sq mi)

Population (2004)
  - Total: 438
  - Density: 61.43/km^{2} (159.1/sq mi)
- Time zone: UTC+1 (CET)
  - Summer (DST): UTC+2 (CEST)
- Postal code: 7731
- Area code: 72

Nagypall (German: Pahl or Nadjpohl; Croatian: Palija) is a village in Baranya county, Hungary.
