= Fazekasboda =

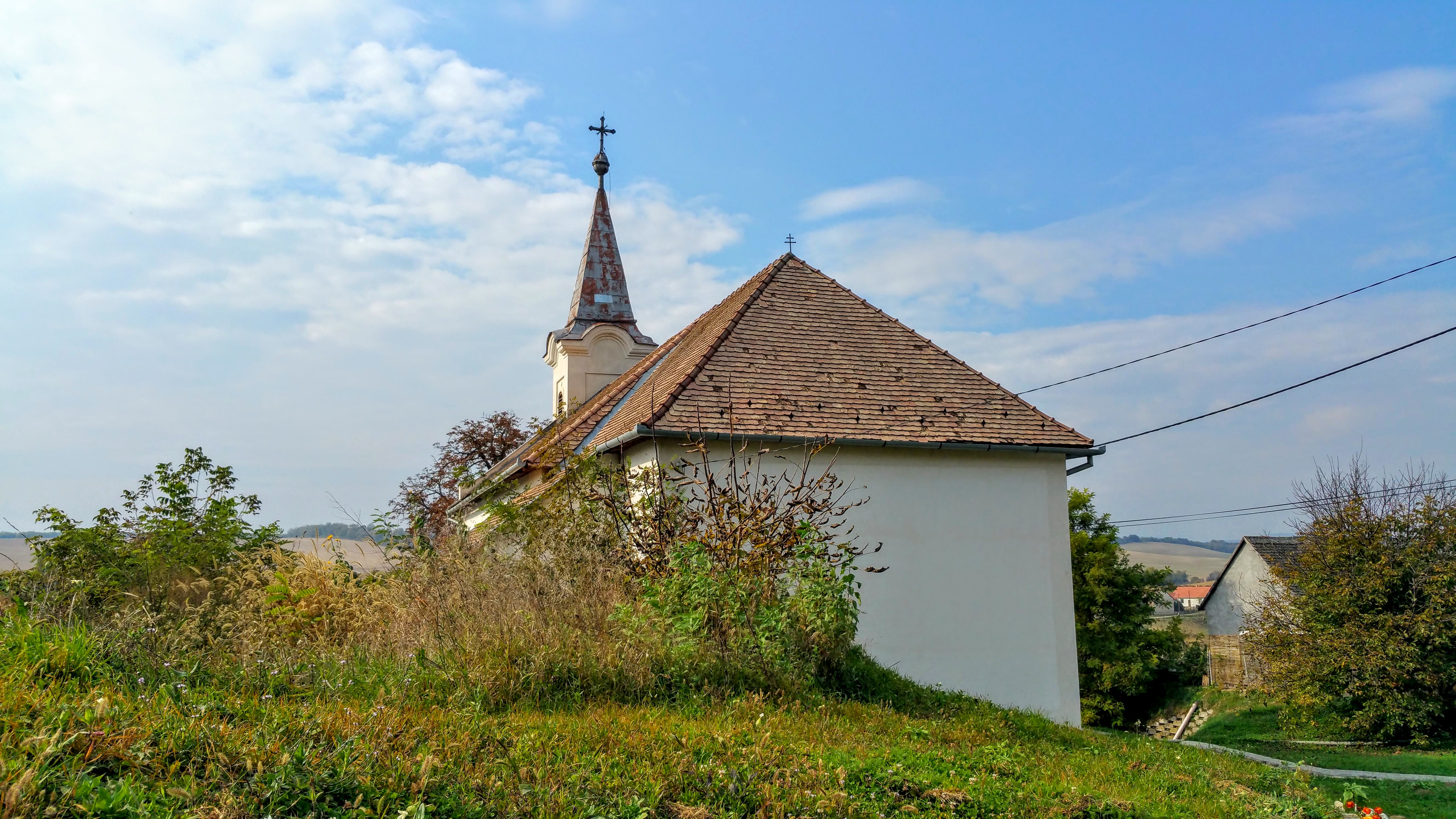

- Location of Baranya county in Hungary

- Location of Fazekasboda
- Coordinates: 46.12356°N 18.48639°E
- Country: Hungary
- County: Baranya

Area
  - Total: 7.02 km^{2} (2.71 sq mi)

Population (2004)
  - Total: 213
  - Density: 30.34/km^{2} (78.6/sq mi)
- Time zone: UTC+1 (CET)
  - Summer (DST): UTC+2 (CEST)
- Postal code: 7732
- Area code: 69

Fazekasboda (Croatian: Bodicа) is a village in Baranya county, Hungary.
