= Kisherend =

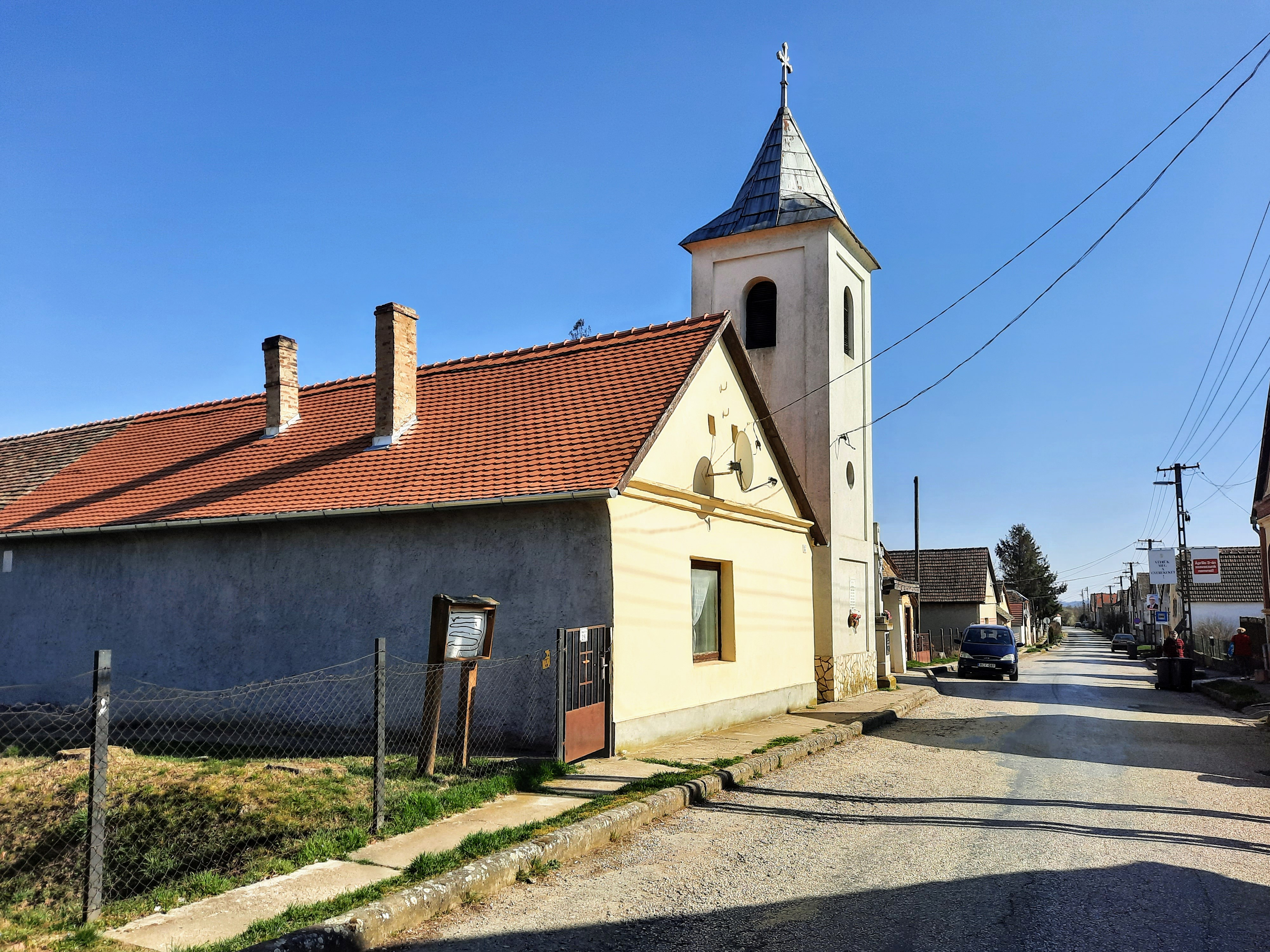

- Coat of arms

- Location of Baranya county in Hungary

- Location of Kisherend
- Coordinates: 45.96571°N 18.33251°E
- Country: Hungary
- County: Baranya

Government
  - Mayor: Varga Zsolt (Ind.)

Area
  - Total: 6.92 km^{2} (2.67 sq mi)

Population (2022)
  - Total: 173
  - Density: 25.0/km^{2} (64.7/sq mi)
- Time zone: UTC+1 (CET)
  - Summer (DST): UTC+2 (CEST)
- Postal code: 7763
- Area code: 72

Kisherend (Croatian: Renda) is a village in Baranya county, Hungary.

== Population ==
According to the 2023 Hungarian Census, 91.9% of the population identified their ethnicity as Hungarian, 7.5% as Roma, 0.6% Croatian, 1.2% as other and 8.1% did not answer the question.
