= Szőkéd =

- Village (Falva)
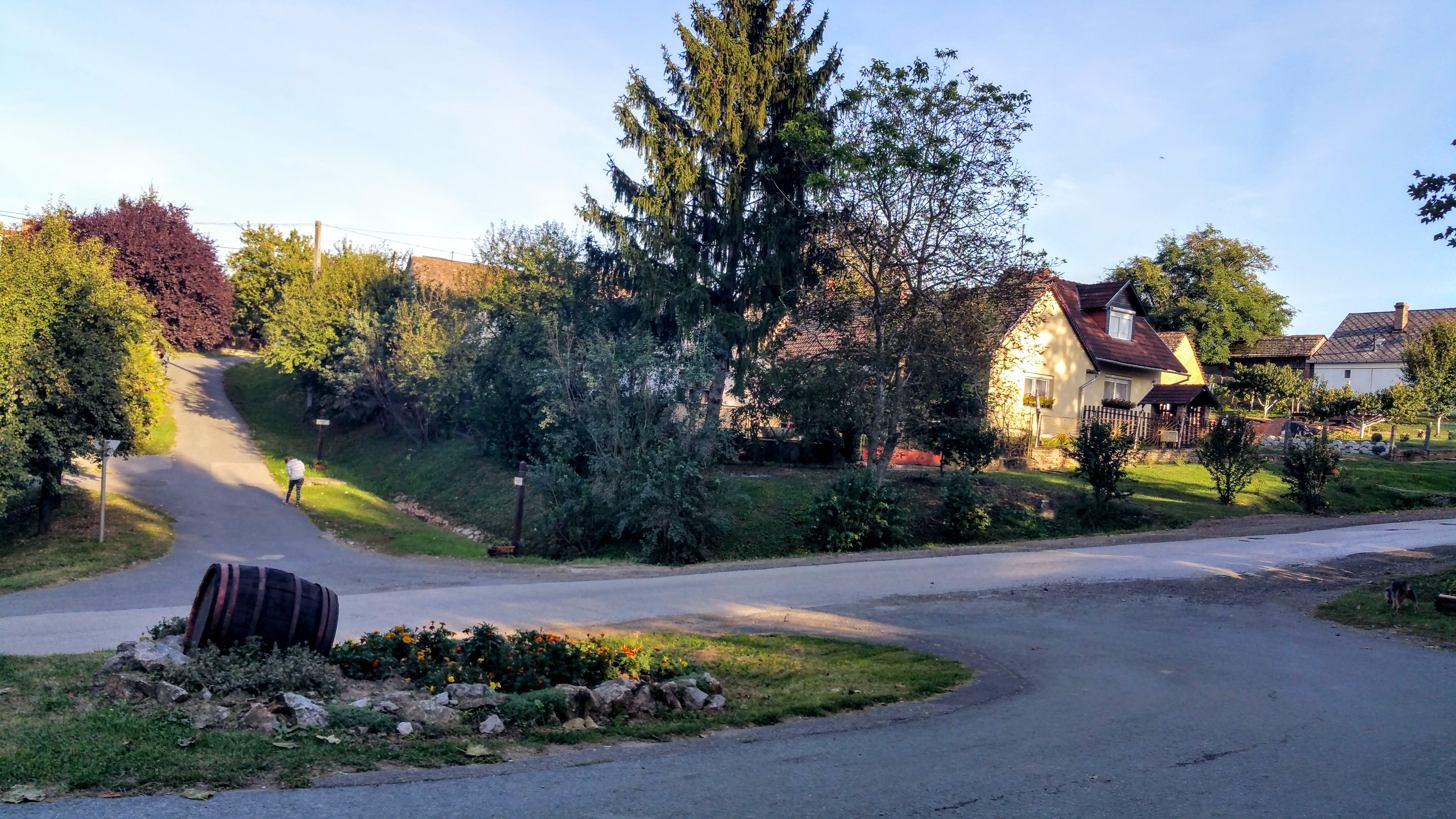
- Interactive map of Szőkéd
- Coordinates: 45°58′N 18°17′E
- Country: Hungary
- County: Baranya
- Time zone: UTC+1 (CET)
  - Summer (DST): UTC+2 (CEST)

Szőkéd is a village in Baranya county, Hungary.
