= Apátvarasd =

Apátvarasd _{Warasch}
- Village
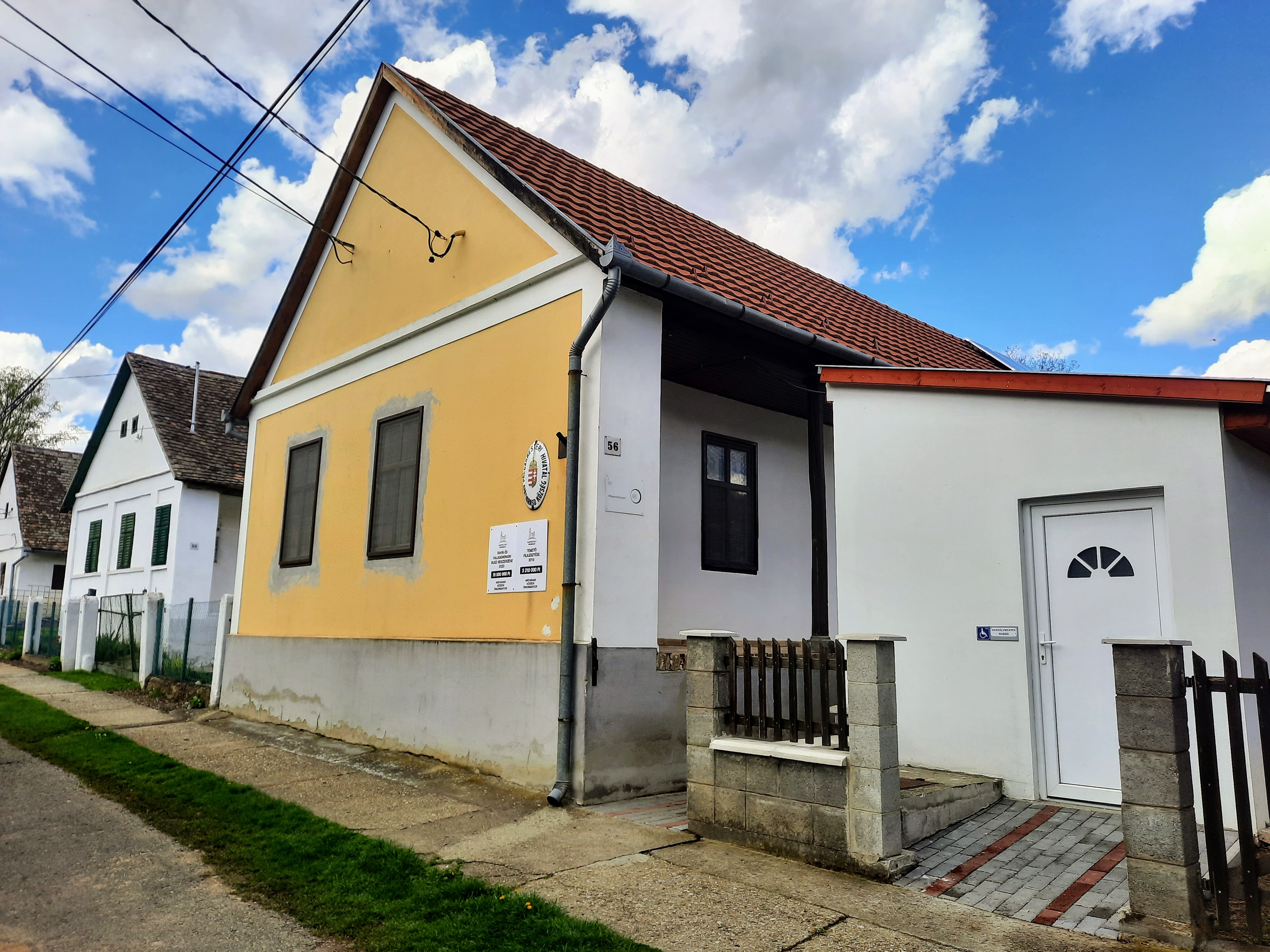
- Village hall

- Location within Hungary
- Coordinates: 46°11′N 18°29′E
- Country: Hungary
- County: Baranya

Area
  - Total: 3.14 sq mi (8.14 km^{2})

Population (2015)
  - Total: 129
  - Density: 41.0/sq mi (15.8/km^{2})
- Time zone: UTC+1 (CET)
  - Summer (DST): UTC+2 (CEST)

Apátvarasd (German: Warasch) is a village in Baranya county, southern Hungary.
