= Birján =

- Village
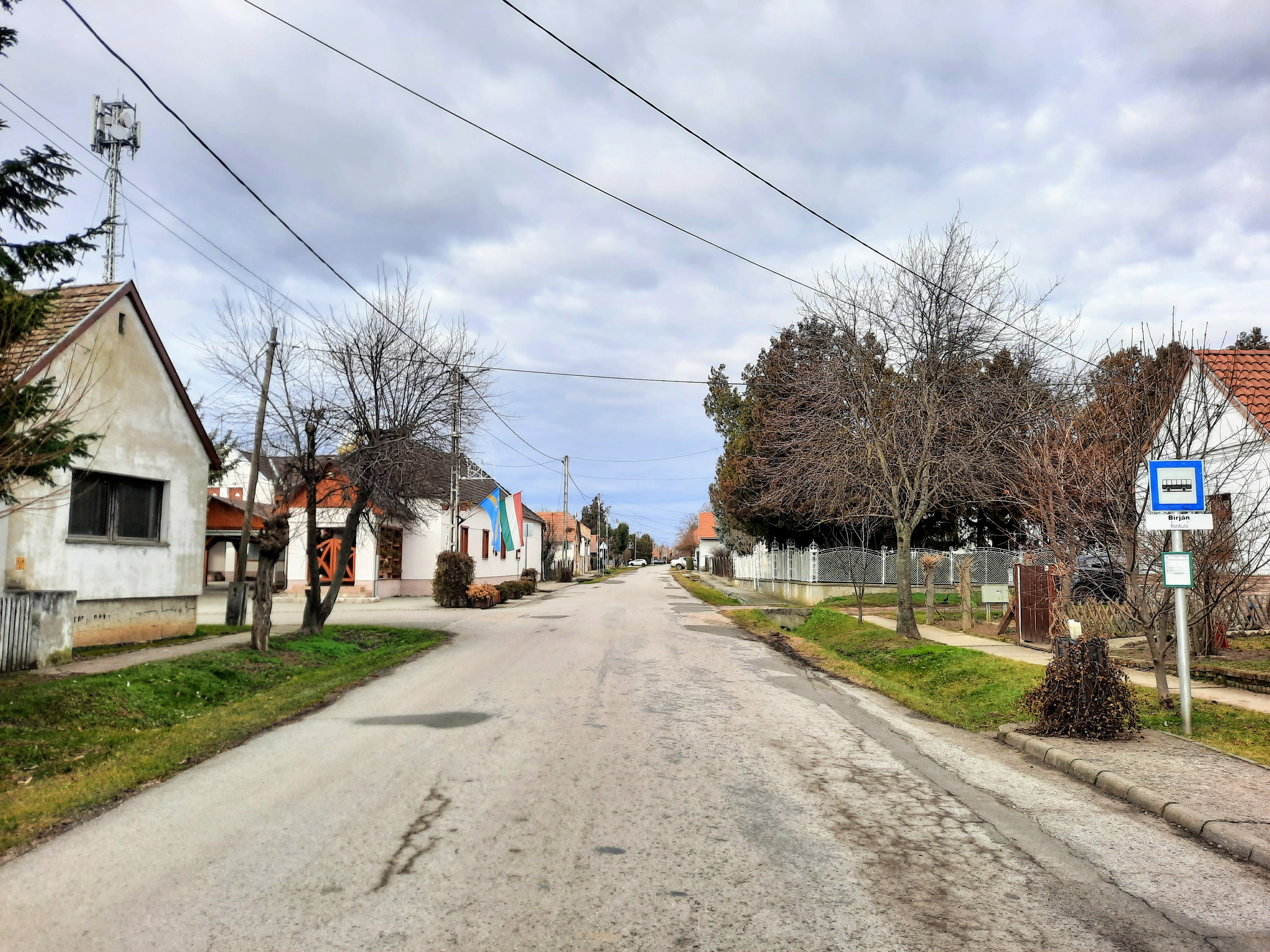

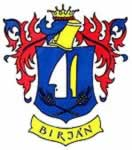
- Seal
- Interactive map of Birján
- Coordinates: 46°00′N 18°22′E
- Country: Hungary
- County: Baranya
- Time zone: UTC+1 (CET)
  - Summer (DST): UTC+2 (CEST)

Birján is a village in Baranya county, Hungary.
