= Erdősmecske =

- Village
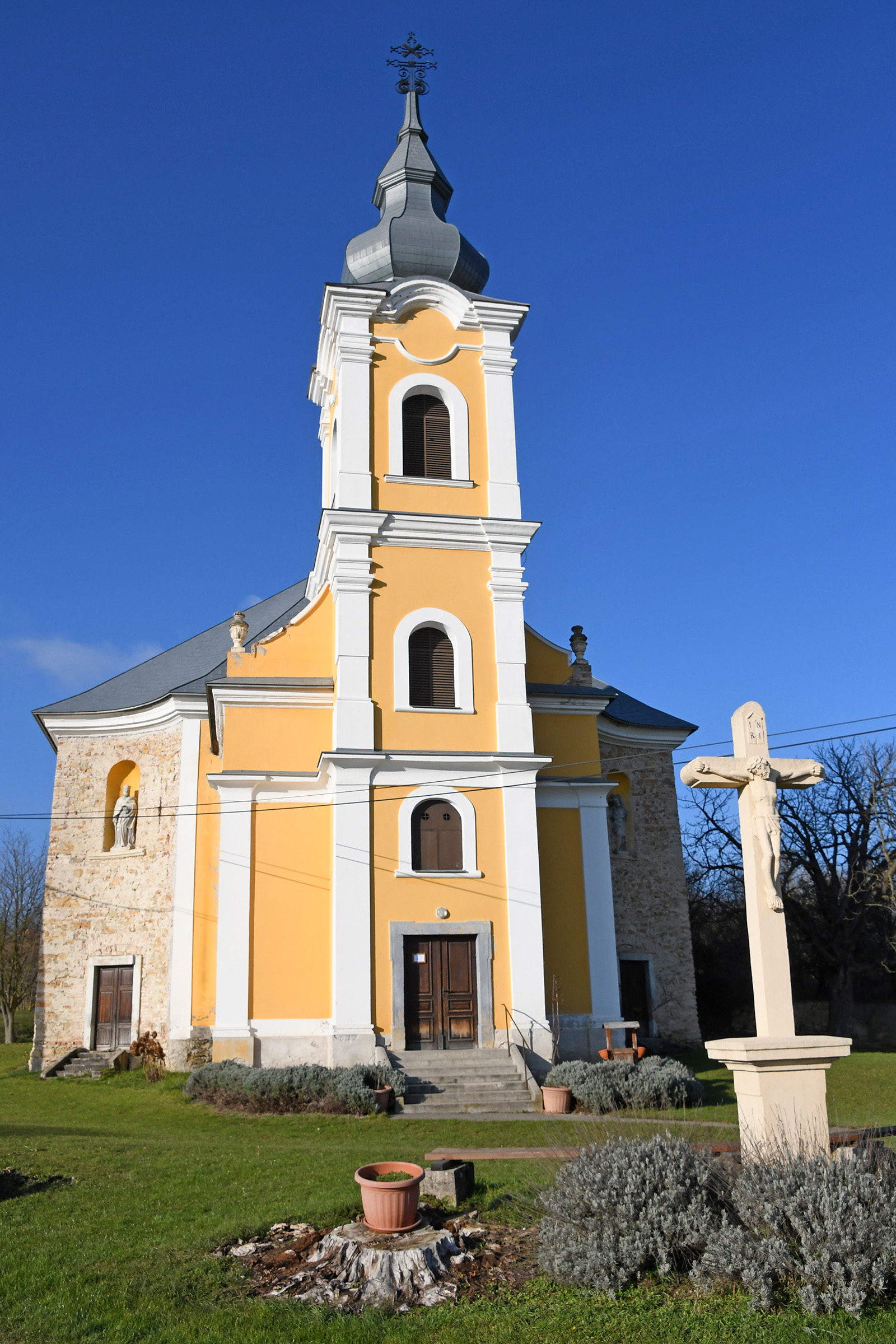
- Erdősmecske, római katolikus templom
- Interactive map of Erdősmecske
- Coordinates: 46°11′N 18°31′E
- Country: Hungary
- County: Baranya
- Time zone: UTC+1 (CET)
  - Summer (DST): UTC+2 (CEST)

Erdősmecske (until 1948: Rácmecske; German: Ratzmetschke, Metschge; Serbian: Српска Мечка / Srpska Mečka, Рацмечка / Racmečka; Croatian: Mečka) is a village in Baranya county, Hungary. The residents' majority is Magyar, with a minority of Serbs. Until the end of World War II, the inhabitants were Danube Swabians. Most of the former German settlers were expelled to Germany and Austria in 1945–1948, pursuant to the Potsdam Agreement.
