= Hidas =

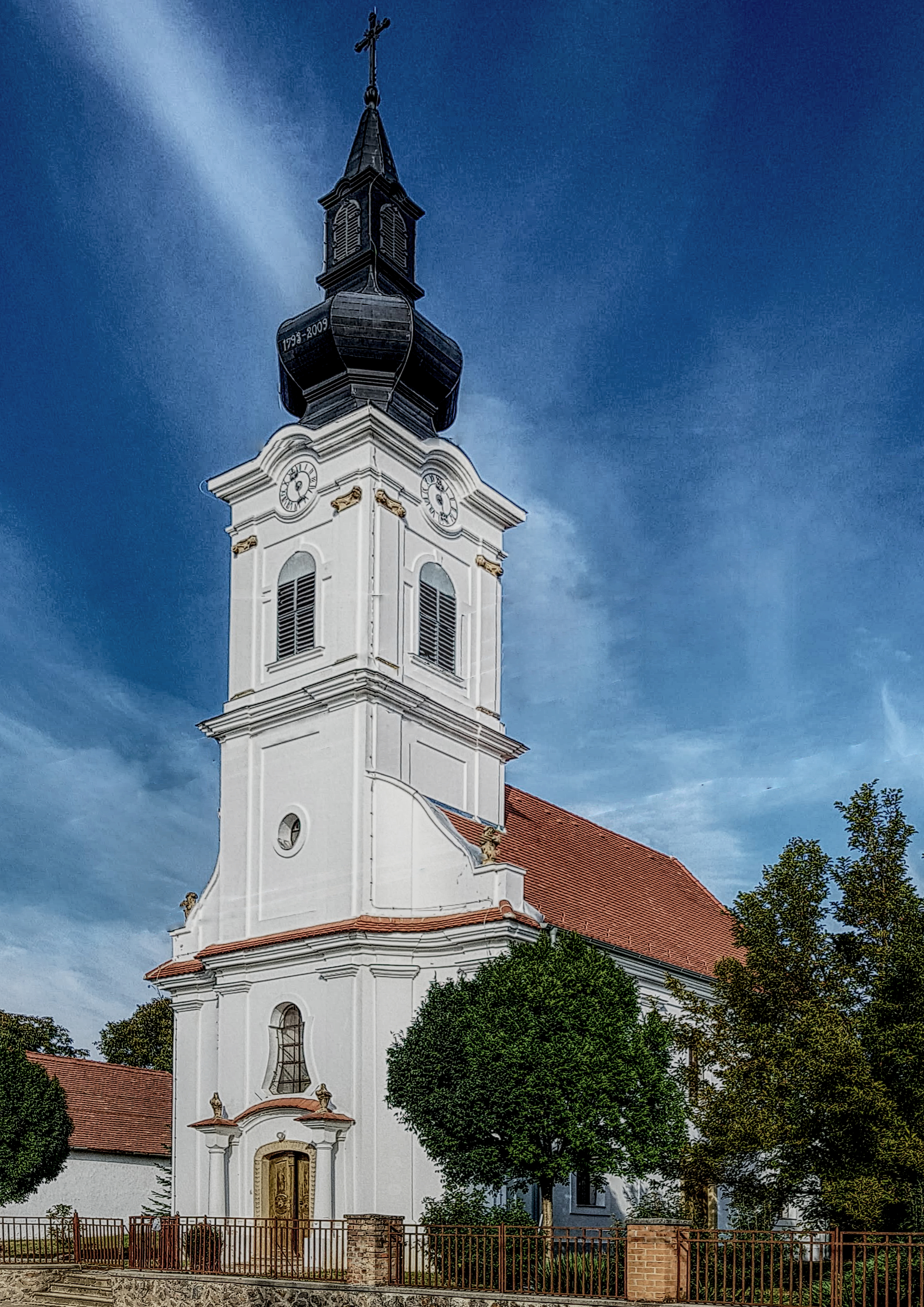
- Protestant church

- Coat of arms

- Location of Hidas
- Coordinates: 46.25640°N 18.49179°E
- Country: Hungary
- County: Baranya

Area
  - Total: 19.06 km^{2} (7.36 sq mi)

Population (2015)
  - Total: 2,046
  - Density: 107.3/km^{2} (278.0/sq mi)
- Time zone: UTC+1 (CET)
  - Summer (DST): UTC+2 (CEST)
- Postal code: 7696
- Area code: 72

Hidas (Croatian: Idoš) is a village in Baranya county, Hungary.
