= Martonfa =

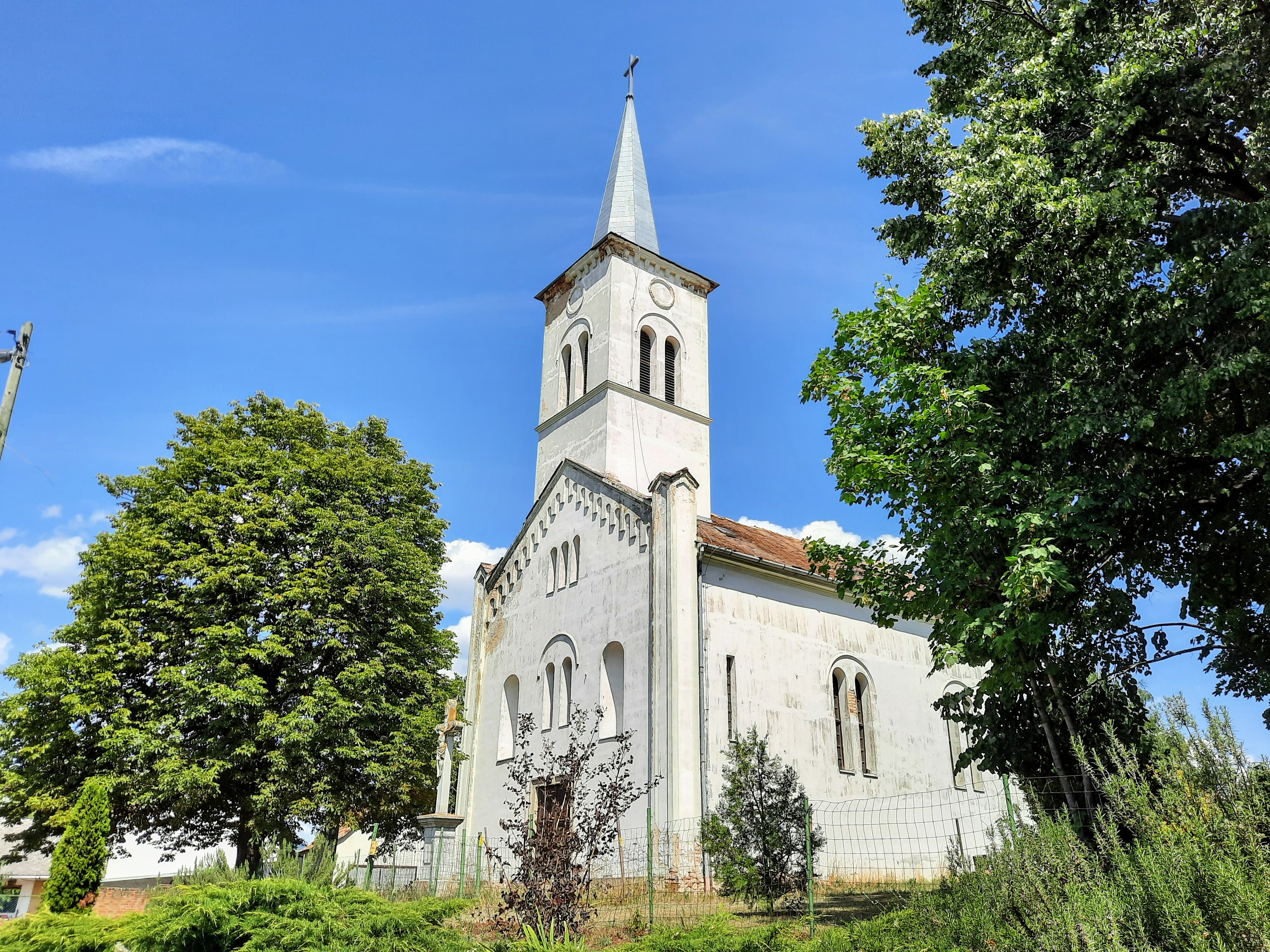

- Location of Baranya county in Hungary

- Location of Martonfa
- Coordinates: 46.11595°N 18.37404°E
- Country: Hungary
- County: Baranya

Area
  - Total: 5.69 km^{2} (2.20 sq mi)

Population (2004)
  - Total: 192
  - Density: 33.74/km^{2} (87.4/sq mi)
- Time zone: UTC+1 (CET)
  - Summer (DST): UTC+2 (CEST)
- Postal code: 7720
- Area code: 72

Martonfa (Croatian: Martofa, Mortona) is a village in Baranya county, Hungary.
