= Szebény =

- Village (Falva)
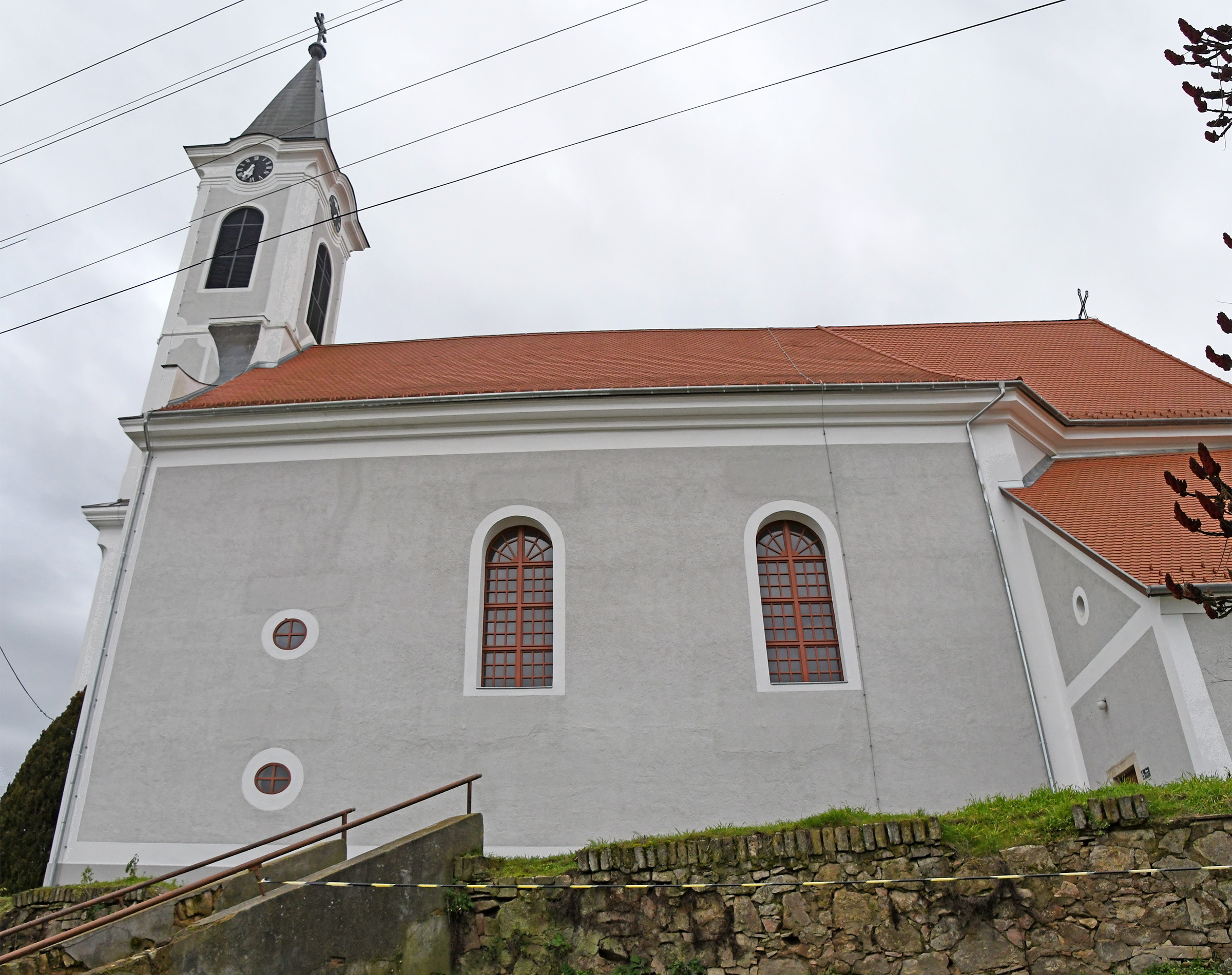
- Interactive map of Szebény
- Coordinates: 46°08′N 18°36′E
- Country: Hungary
- County: Baranya

Population (2025)
  - Total: 288
- Time zone: UTC+1 (CET)
  - Summer (DST): UTC+2 (CEST)

Szebény is a village in Baranya county, Hungary.
