= Lovászhetény =

- Village
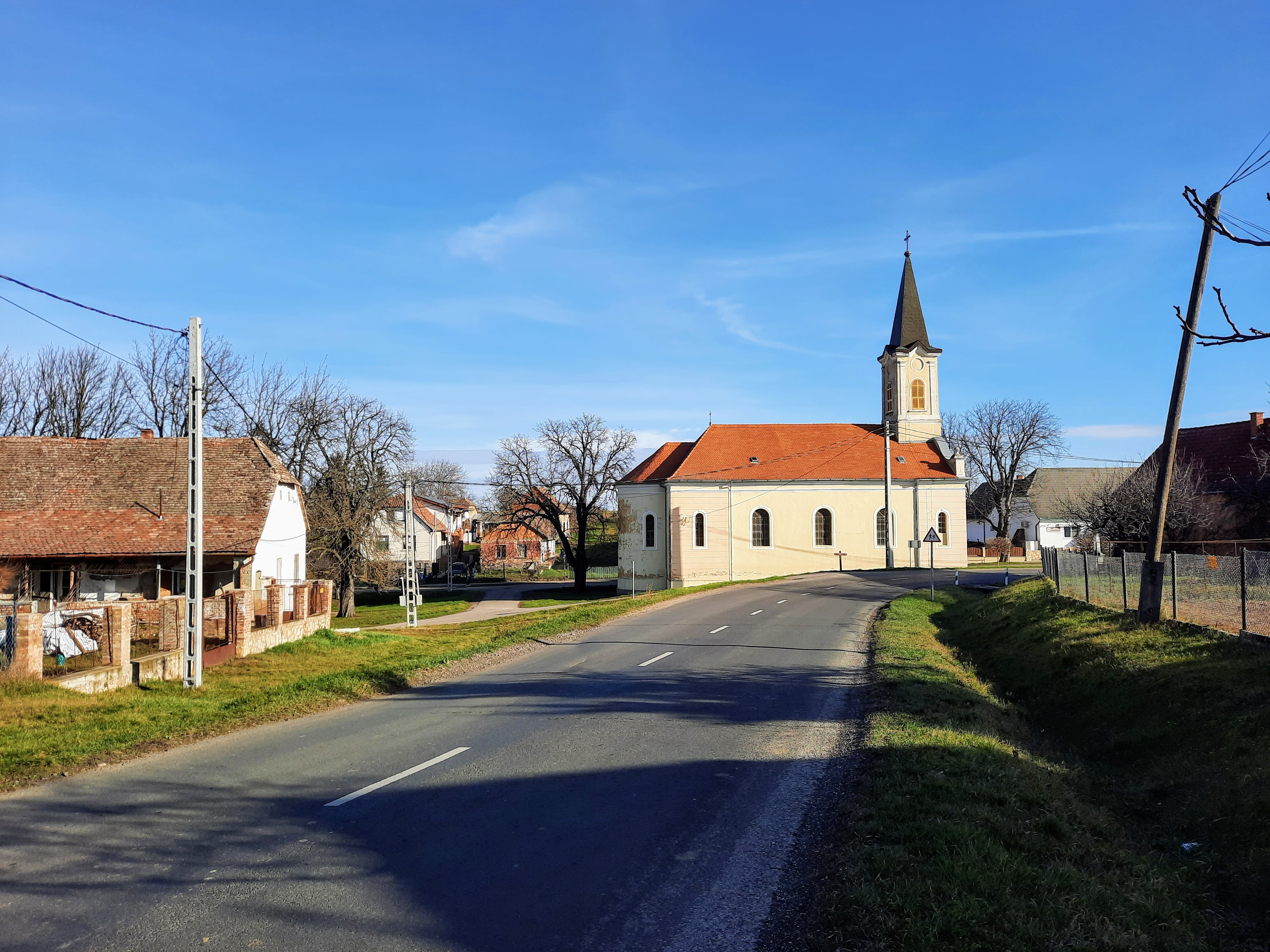
- Interactive map of Lovászhetény
- Coordinates: 46°10′N 18°29′E
- Country: Hungary
- County: Baranya

Population (2025)
  - Total: 261
- Time zone: UTC+1 (CET)
  - Summer (DST): UTC+2 (CEST)

Lovászhetény is a village in Baranya county, Hungary.
