= Magyaregregy =

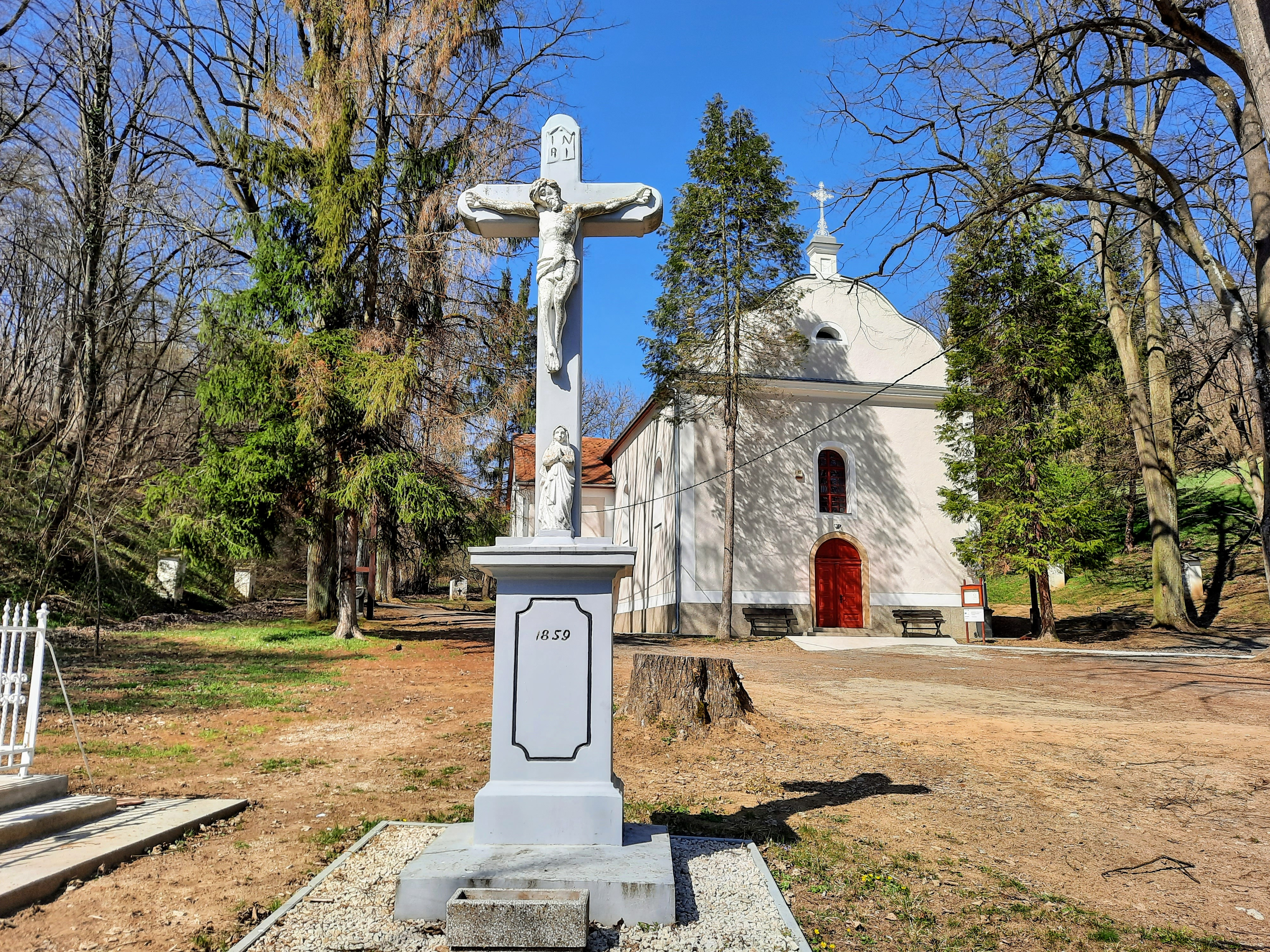

- Location of Baranya county in Hungary

- Location of Magyaregregy
- Coordinates: 46.25136°N 18.30798°E
- Country: Hungary
- County: Baranya

Area
  - Total: 26.81 km^{2} (10.35 sq mi)

Population (2004)
  - Total: 824
  - Density: 30.73/km^{2} (79.6/sq mi)
- Time zone: UTC+1 (CET)
  - Summer (DST): UTC+2 (CEST)
- Postal code: 7332
- Area code: 72

Magyaregregy (Croatian: Gređa) is a village in Baranya county, Hungary.

== Sightseeing ==
The local tourist attraction Castle Máré (Hungarian: Máré vár or Máré vára) is situated on the top of the hill next to Magyaregregy. There is a well marked path to the castle, from the municipal swimming pool just to the South of the village.
