= János Hargitai =

Hungarian jurist and politician

Member of the National Assembly
- Incumbent
- Assumed office 18 June 1998

Personal details
- Born: April 24, 1958 (age 68) Mohács, Hungary
- Party: Fidesz; KDNP
- Spouse: Dr Klára Hargitainé Pilári
- Children: Linda
- Profession: jurist

Dr. János Hargitai (born 24 April 1958) is a Hungarian jurist and politician (Fidesz then KDNP), who has been a member of the National Assembly since 1998. In this capacity, he represented Mohács (Baranya County Constituency V then III) from 1998 to 2026.

== Career ==
He served as chairman of the council then mayor of Nagynyárád from 1985 to 1994 and from 2002 to 2010. He also functioned as President of the General Assembly of Baranya County between 2006 and 2010. He was appointed Director of the Government Office of Baranya County in January 2011, holding the office until May 2014. He became Chairman of the Committee on Immunity in September 2017.

Hargitai was elected MP for Mohács seven times (1998, 2002, 2006, 2010, 2014, 2018, 2022). He was a member of the parliament's Budget and Finance Committee from 1998 to 2011 (he briefly chaired the committee in May 2002) and from 2014 to 2026 (vice-chairman until 2022). Beside that he was also involved in the Human Rights, Minority and Religious Affairs Committee from 1998 to 2006. He functioned as a deputy leader of the KDNP parliamentary group from 2006 to 2014. He was a member of the Ad hoc committee for the preparation of the Constitution between 2010 and 2011. He served as chairman of the Immunity Committee between 2017 and 2026. Hargitai was defeated by Tisza candidate Áron Rózsahegyi in Mohács constituency during the 2026 Hungarian parliamentary election. Nevertheless, he was selected as MP via the national list of Fidesz–KDNP by the party presidium. He was appointed a vice-chairman of the Immunity Committee.

== Personal life ==
He is married. His wife is Dr Klára Hargitainé Pilári. They have a daughter, Linda.
