= Maráza =

- Village
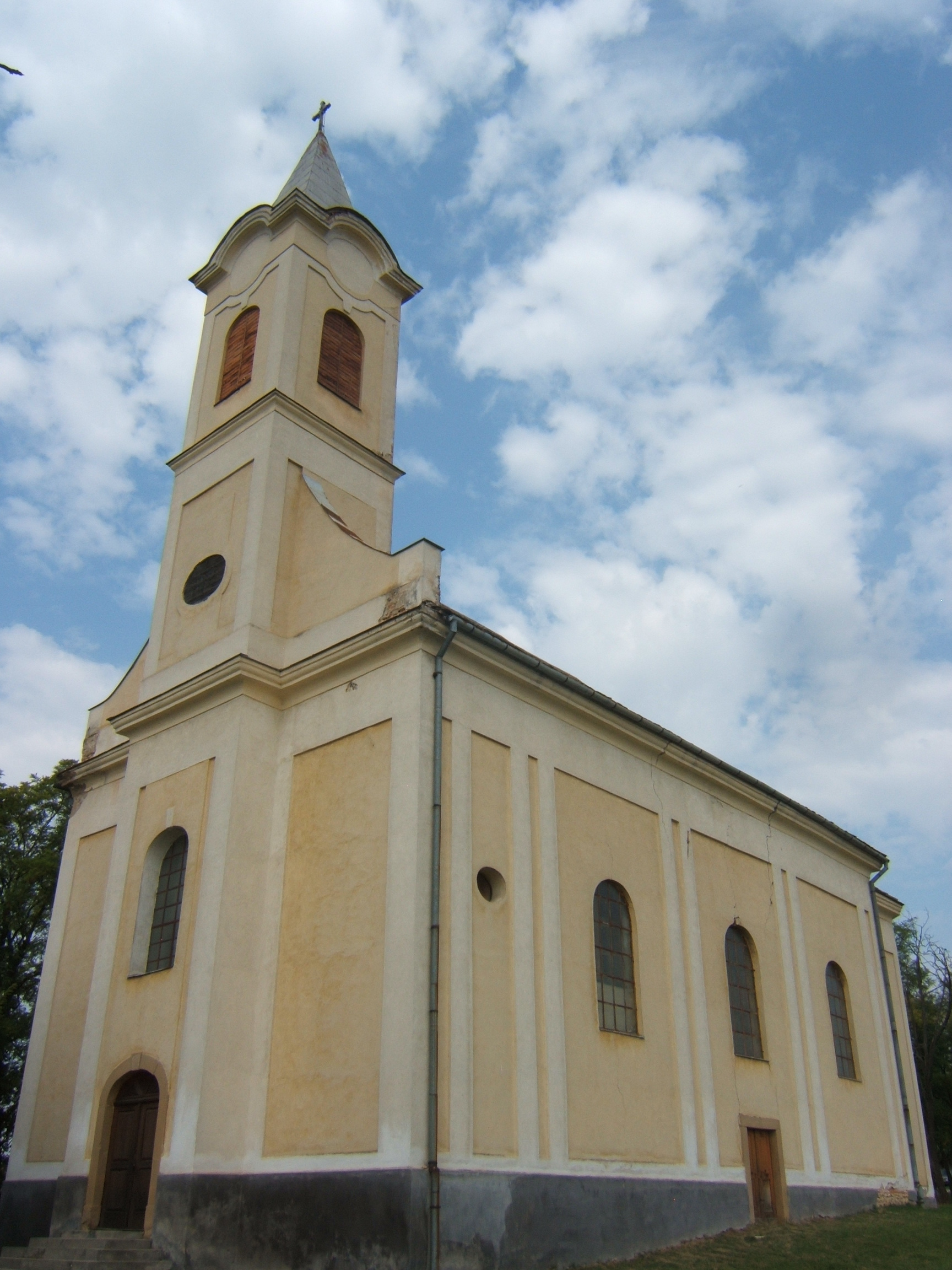
- Maráza, templom

- Coat of arms
- Interactive map of Maráza
- Coordinates: 46°04′33″N 18°30′37″E
- Country: Hungary
- County: Baranya
- Time zone: UTC+1 (CET)
  - Summer (DST): UTC+2 (CEST)

Maráza is a village in Baranya county, Hungary.

== Gallery ==
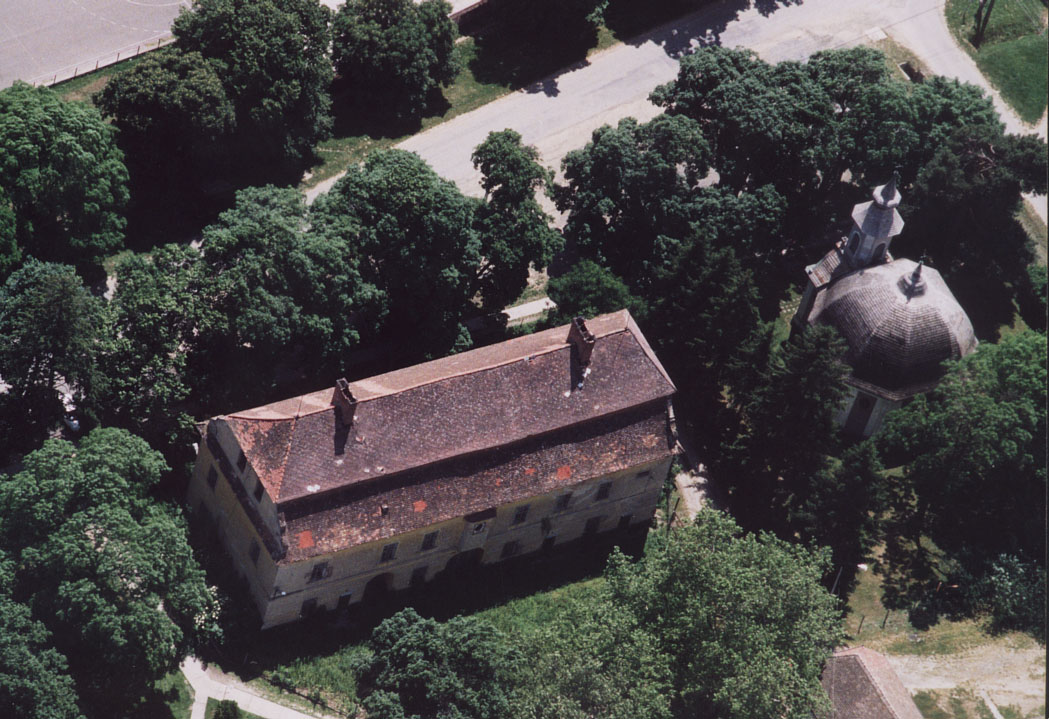
Aerial photo: Mecseknádasd - Palace

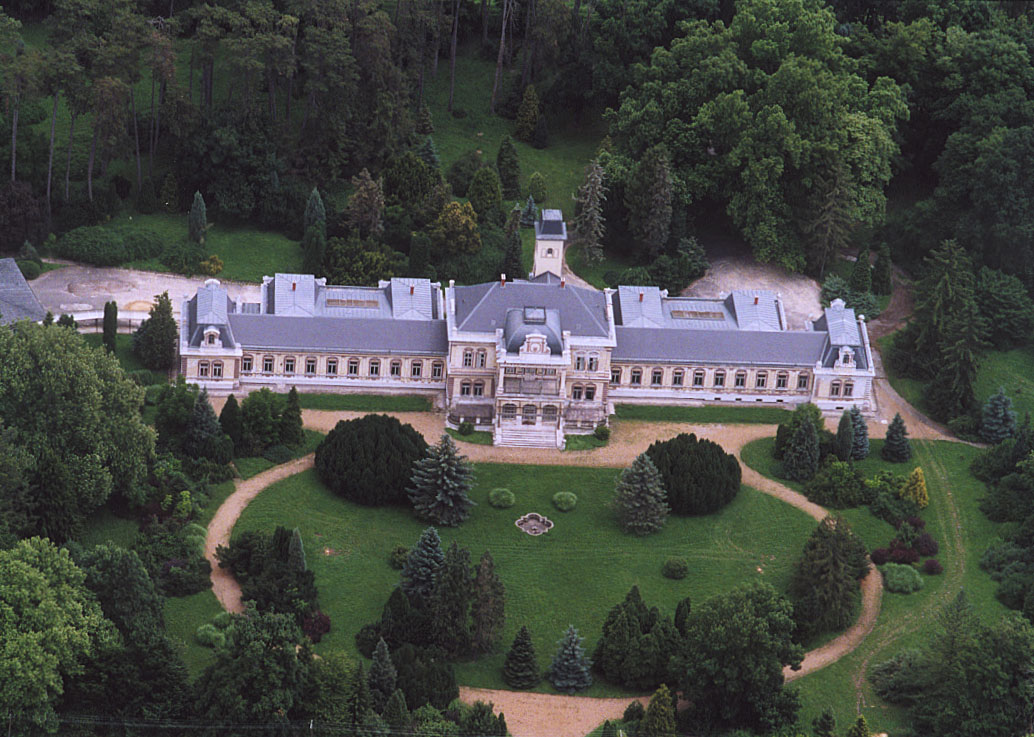
Szentegát - Biedermann-Palace from above

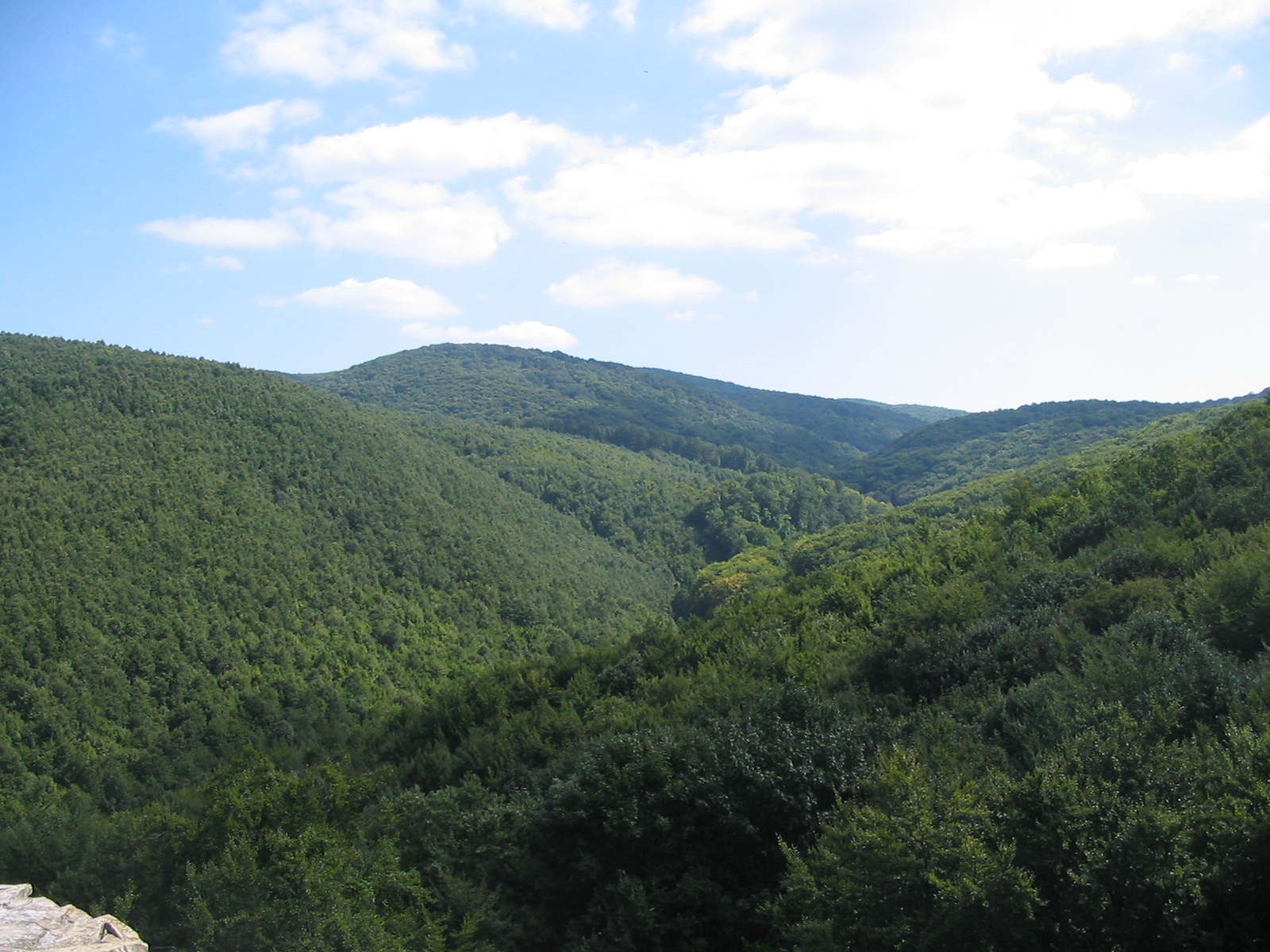
Mecsek Mountains, in the northern area of the county

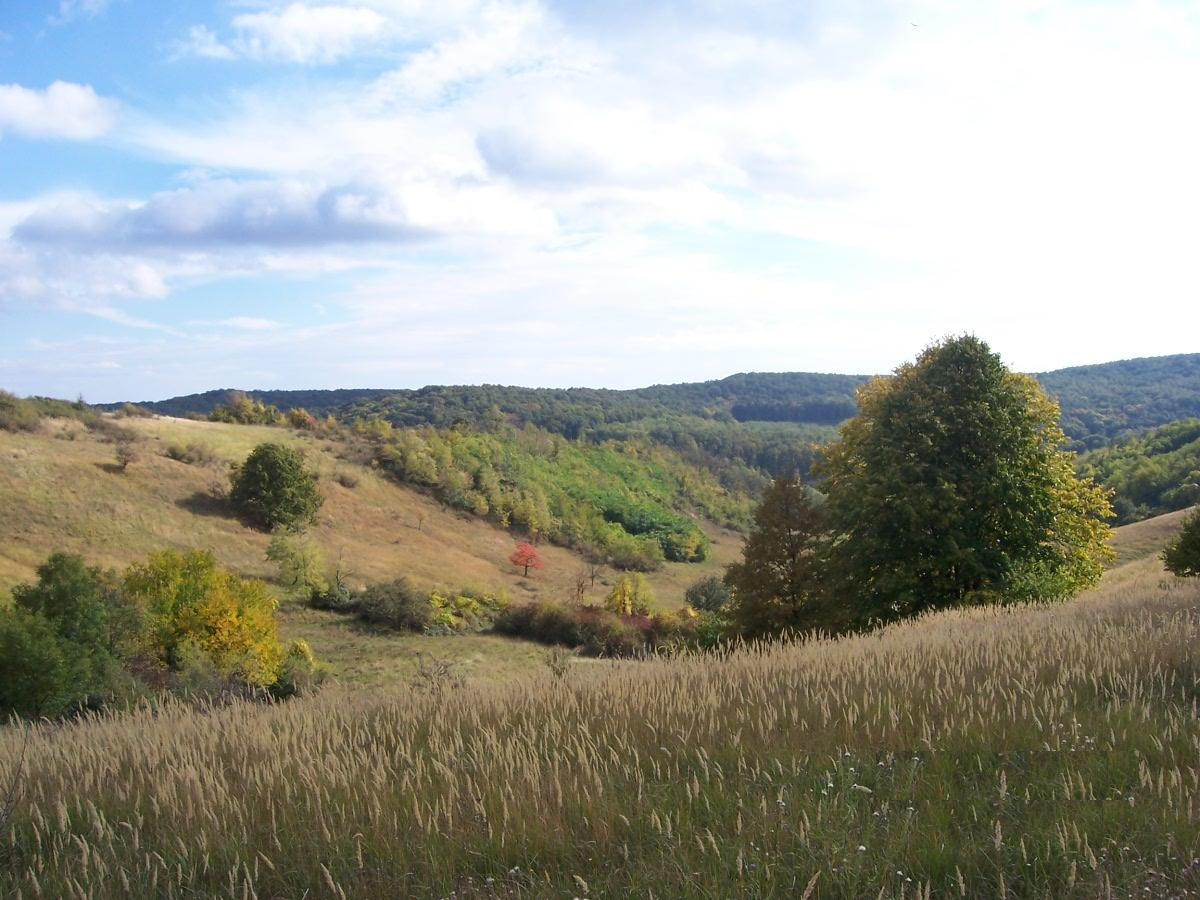
Hills in the northeast
