= Újpetre =

- Village (Falva)
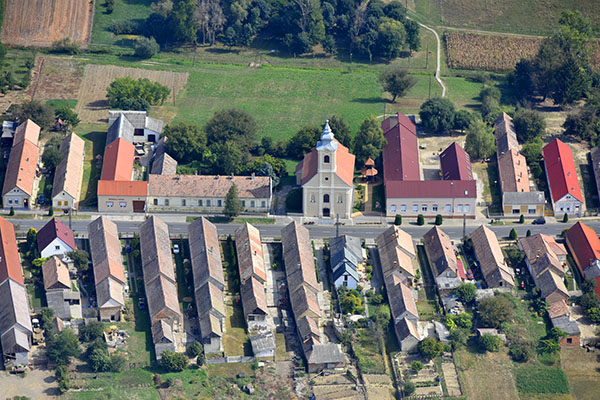
- Interactive map of Újpetre
- Coordinates: 45°56′N 18°22′E
- Country: Hungary
- County: Baranya
- Time zone: UTC+1 (CET)
  - Summer (DST): UTC+2 (CEST)

Újpetre is a village in Baranya county, Hungary. Until the end of World War II, the inhabitants were Danube Swabians, also called locally as Stifolder, because their ancestors arrived around 1720 from Fulda (district). Most of the former German settlers were expelled to Allied-occupied Germany and Allied-occupied Austria in 1945–1948, following the Potsdam Agreement. Only a few Germans of Hungary live there, the majority today are the descendants of Hungarians from the Czechoslovak–Hungarian population exchange. They occupied the houses of the former Danube Swabian inhabitants.
