= Kistapolca =

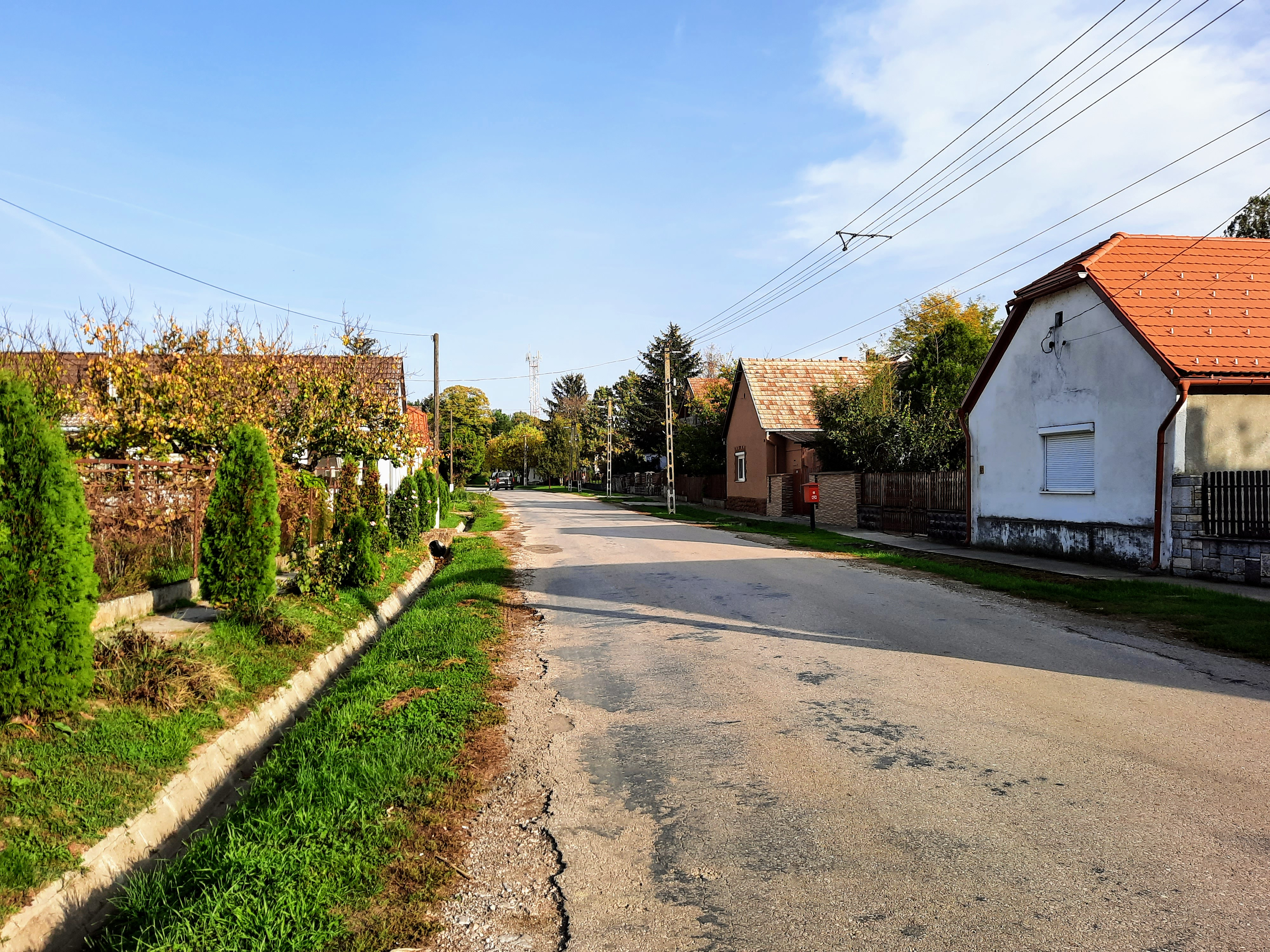

- Location of Baranya county in Hungary

- Location of Kistapolca
- Coordinates: 45.82120°N 18.38462°E
- Country: Hungary
- County: Baranya

Area
  - Total: 3.57 km^{2} (1.38 sq mi)

Population (2004)
  - Total: 215
  - Density: 60.22/km^{2} (156.0/sq mi)
- Time zone: UTC+1 (CET)
  - Summer (DST): UTC+2 (CEST)
- Postal code: 7823
- Area code: 72

Kistapolca (Croatian: Tapoca) is a village in Baranya county, Hungary.
