= Kisjakabfalva =

Kisjakabfalva Jackfall
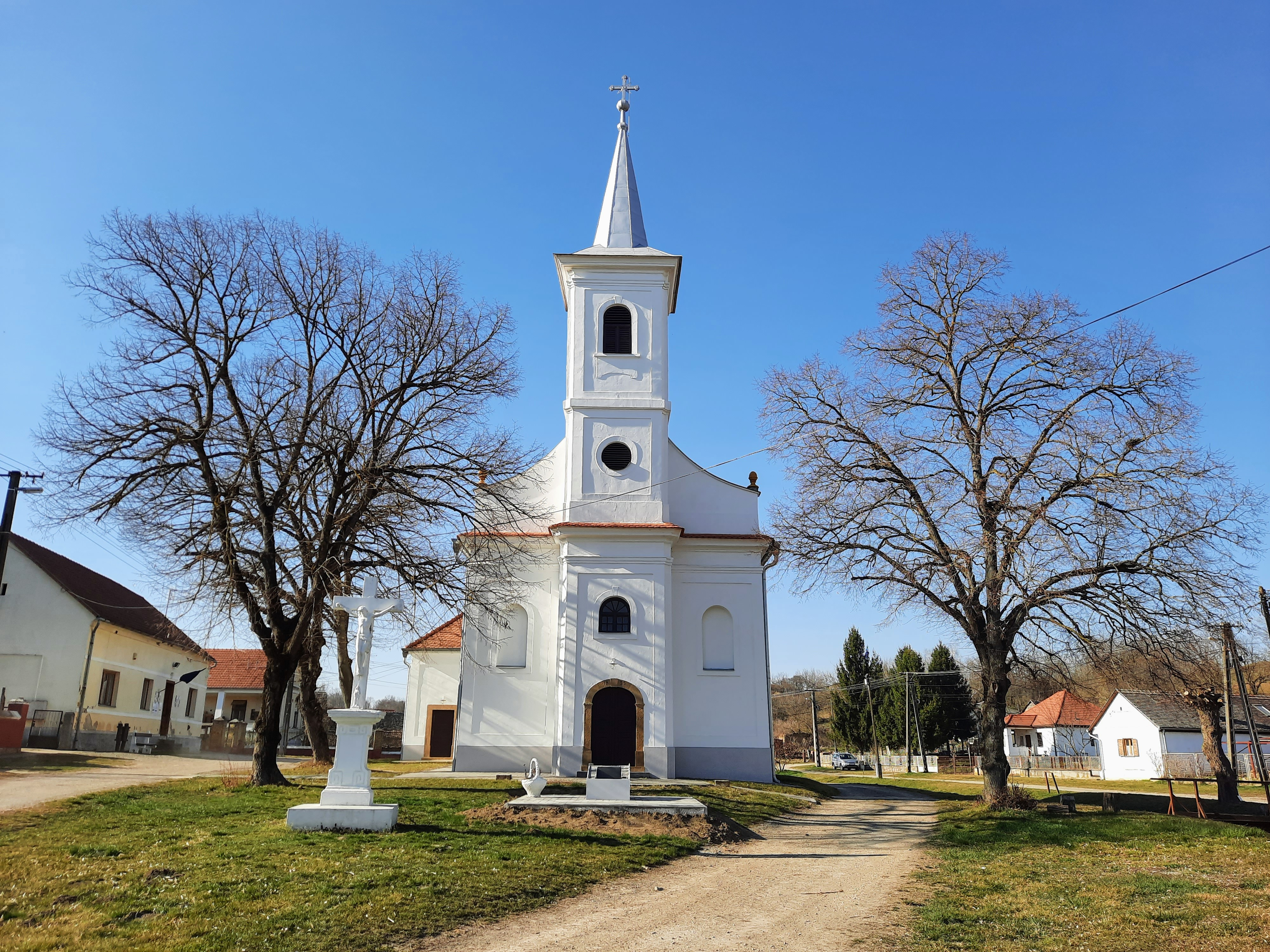

- Location of Baranya county in Hungary

- Location of Kisjakabfalva
- Coordinates: 45.89603°N 18.43625°E
- Country: Hungary
- County: Baranya

Area
  - Total: 6.62 km^{2} (2.56 sq mi)

Population (2004)
  - Total: 157
  - Density: 23.71/km^{2} (61.4/sq mi)
- Time zone: UTC+1 (CET)
  - Summer (DST): UTC+2 (CEST)
- Postal code: 7773
- Area code: 72

Kisjakabfalva (German: Jackfall; Croatian: Jakubovo) is a village in Baranya county, Hungary. Until the end of World War II, the majority of the inhabitants were Danube Swabians, also called locally as Stifolder, because their ancestors arrived in the 17th and 18th centuries from Fulda (district). Most of the former German settlers were expelled to Allied-occupied Germany and Allied-occupied Austria in 1945–1948, as a result of the Potsdam Agreement. Only a few Germans of Hungary live there, the majority today are the descendants of Hungarians from the Czechoslovak–Hungarian population exchange. They occupied the houses of the former Danube Swabian inhabitants.
