= Lapáncsa =

Lapáncsa Lappantsch
- Village
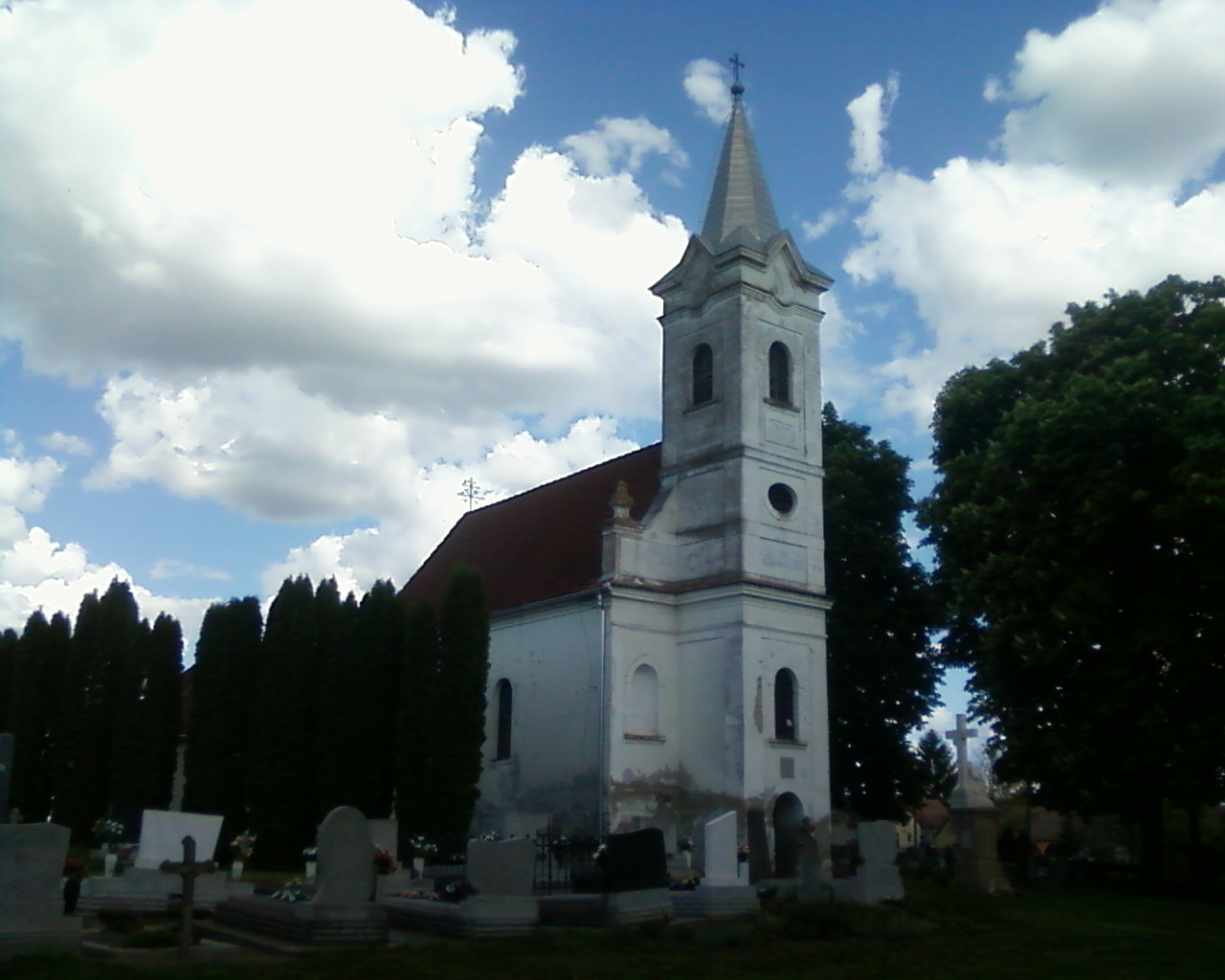
- Interactive map of Lapáncsa
- Location within Hungary
- Coordinates: 45°49′N 18°30′E
- Country: Hungary
- County: Baranya

Area
  - Total: 0.65 sq mi (1.68 km^{2})
  - Land: 0.65 sq mi (1.68 km^{2})
- Time zone: UTC+1 (CET)
  - Summer (DST): UTC+2 (CEST)
- Postal code: 7775

Lapáncsa (German: Lappantsch) is a village in Baranya county, Hungary.

== History ==
Prior to Lapáncsa, the village of Gathwege is mentioned as being in the area as early as 1349. The village was destroyed during the Battle of Mohács.

Lapáncsa proper was established by 18 German families in 1760 from Bavaria. The origin of its name is unknown. Until the end of World War II, the inhabitants were all Roman Catholic Danube Swabians, locally called stifulder, because the majority of their ancestors arrived from Fulda during the 17th and 18th centuries. Most of the former German Settlers were expelled to Allied-occupied Germany and Allied-occupied Austria from 1945-1948 as a result of the Potsdam Agreement. Only a few Germans of Hungary currently live there; the majority of the population today are the descendants of Hungarians from the Czechoslovak–Hungarian population exchange.

== Geography ==
Lapáncsa has a total area of 1.68 km^{2}. Three rivers run through the village, one of them being the Karašica River. The only Catholic church in the village, Katolikus Templom, is one of the main sights to see.

== Demographics ==
As of January 2021, Lapáncsa had a population of 176.

According to a 2011 census, 84.7% of the residents identified themselves as Hungarian, 7.9% as Gypsy, 1.5% as German, and 15.3% did not declare. (Due to dual identities, the total may be greater than 100%.) The religious distribution was 58.6% Roman Catholic, 3% Reformed, 1% Greek Catholic, 4.4% non-denominational, and 33% did not declare.
