= Kislippó =

- Village
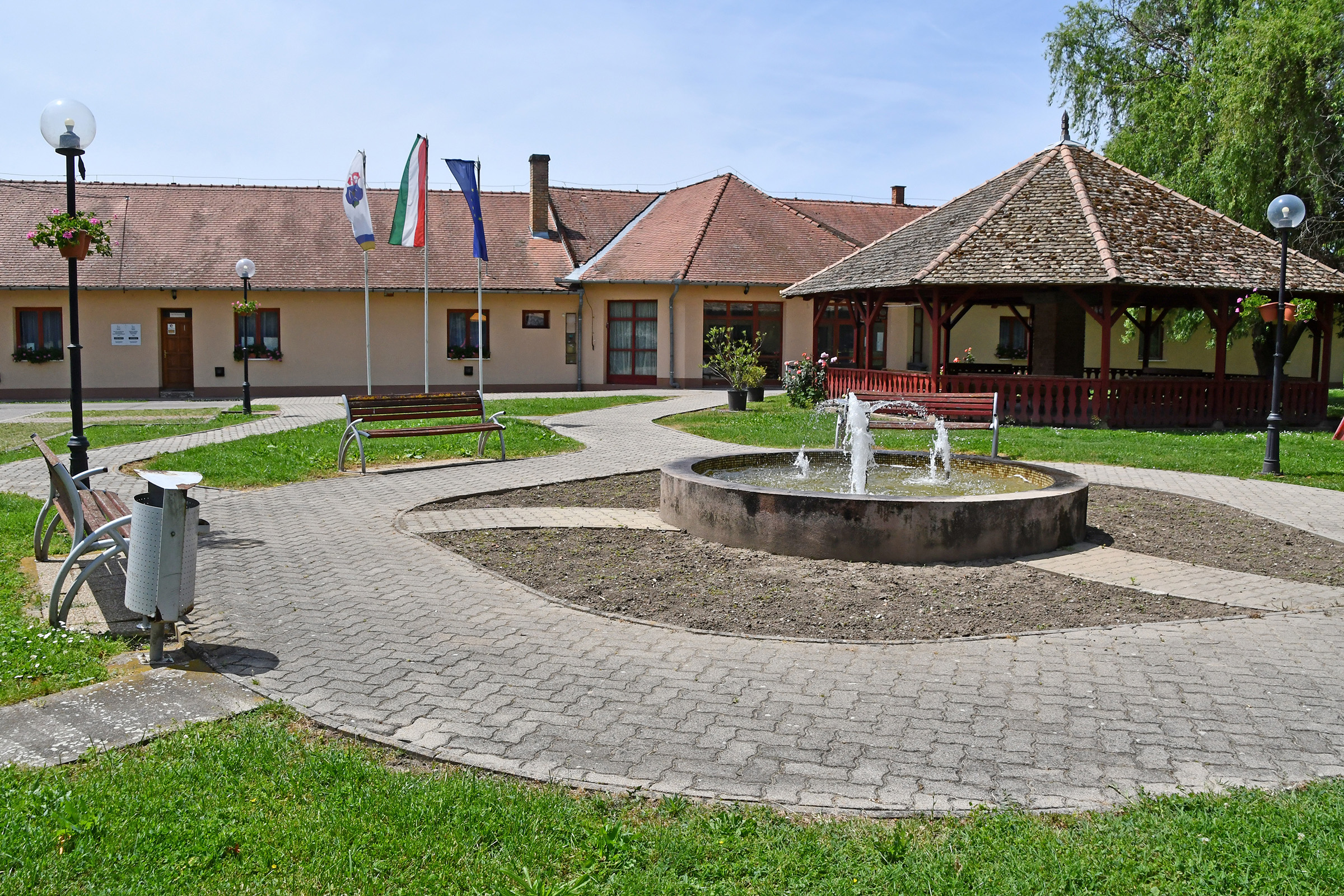
- Town hall

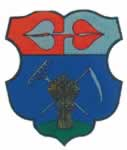
- Coat of arms
- Interactive map of Kislippó
- Location of Kislippó
- Coordinates: 45°49′37″N 18°31′53″E
- Country: Hungary
- County: Baranya

Area
  - Total: 3.23 sq mi (8.37 km^{2})

Population (2014)
  - Total: 273
  - Density: 83.9/sq mi (32.38/km^{2})
- Time zone: UTC+1 (CET)
  - Summer (DST): UTC+2 (CEST)
- Postal Code: 7775
- Area code: 72

Kislippó (Croatian: Lipovica) is a village in Baranya county, Hungary.
