= Kásád =

Kásád Kašad
- Village
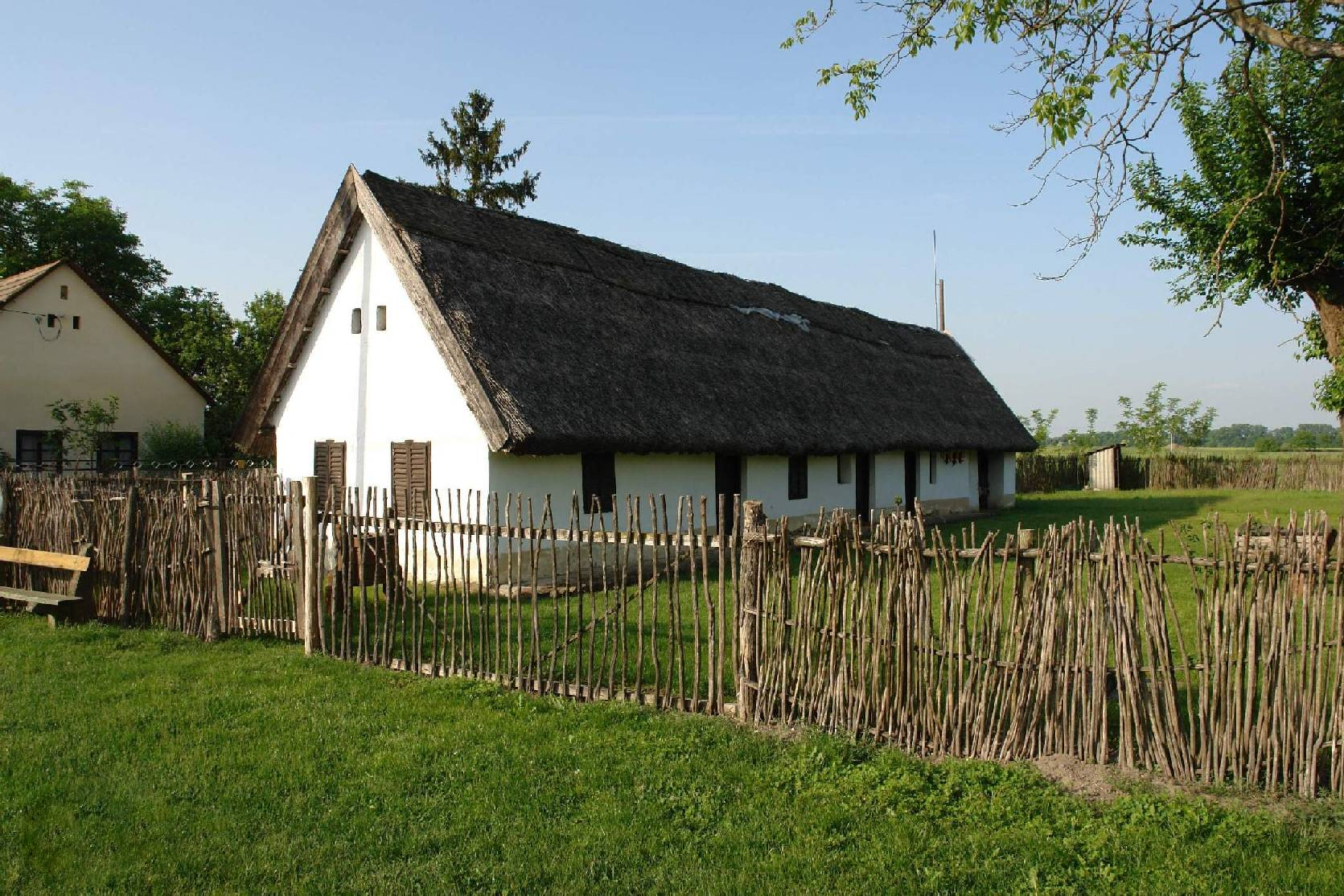
- Interactive map of Kásád
- Coordinates: 45°47′N 18°24′E
- Country: Hungary
- County: Baranya
- Time zone: UTC+1 (CET)
  - Summer (DST): UTC+2 (CEST)

Kásád (Croatian: Kašad) is a village in Baranya County, Hungary. It is the southernmost settlement of the country.
