= Pécsdevecser =

- Village
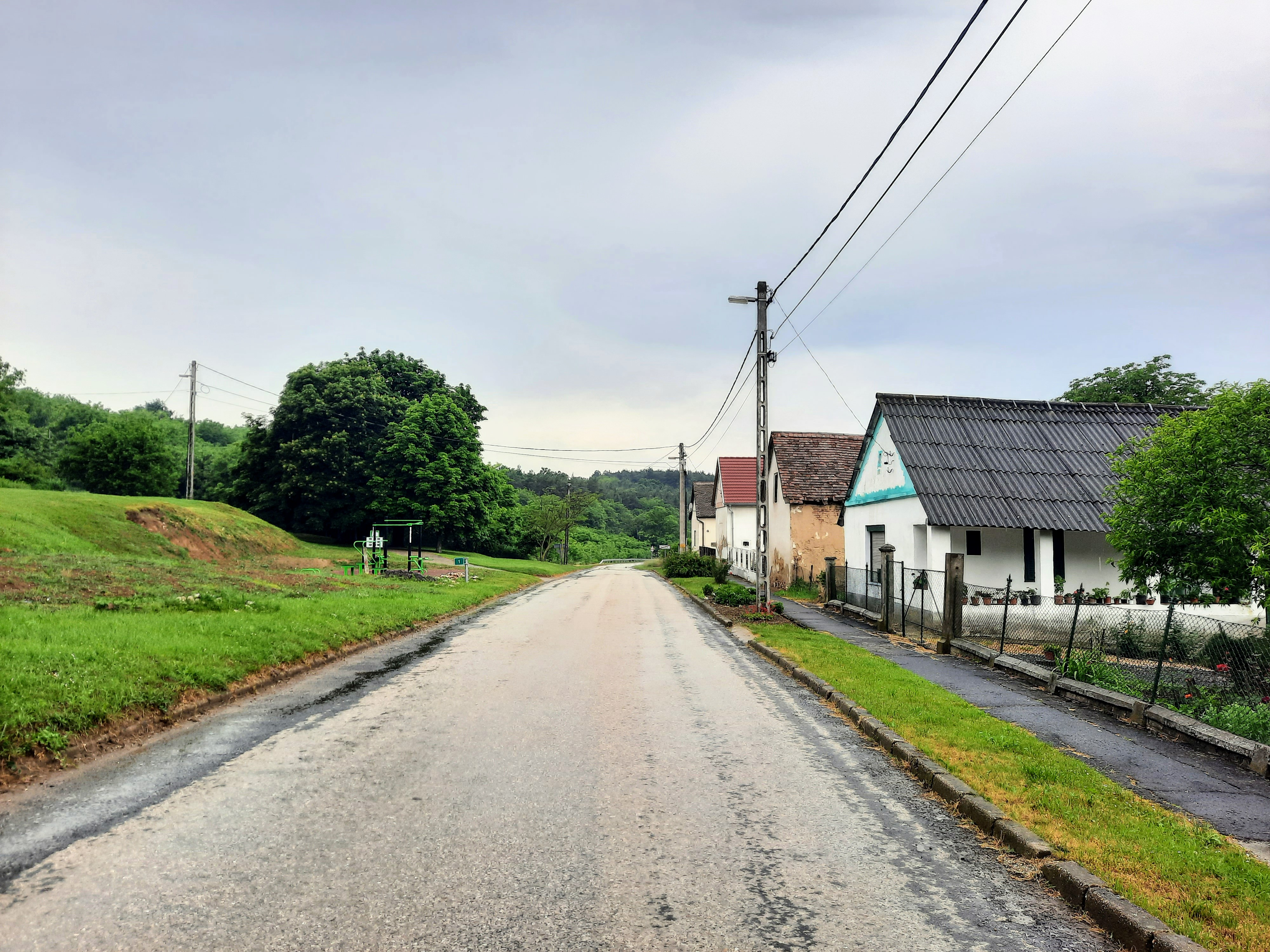
- Interactive map of Pécsdevecser
- Coordinates: 45°57′N 18°23′E
- Country: Hungary
- County: Baranya

Population (2025)
  - Total: 87
- Time zone: UTC+1 (CET)
  - Summer (DST): UTC+2 (CEST)

Pécsdevecser is a village in Baranya county, Hungary.
