= Egyházasharaszti =

- Village
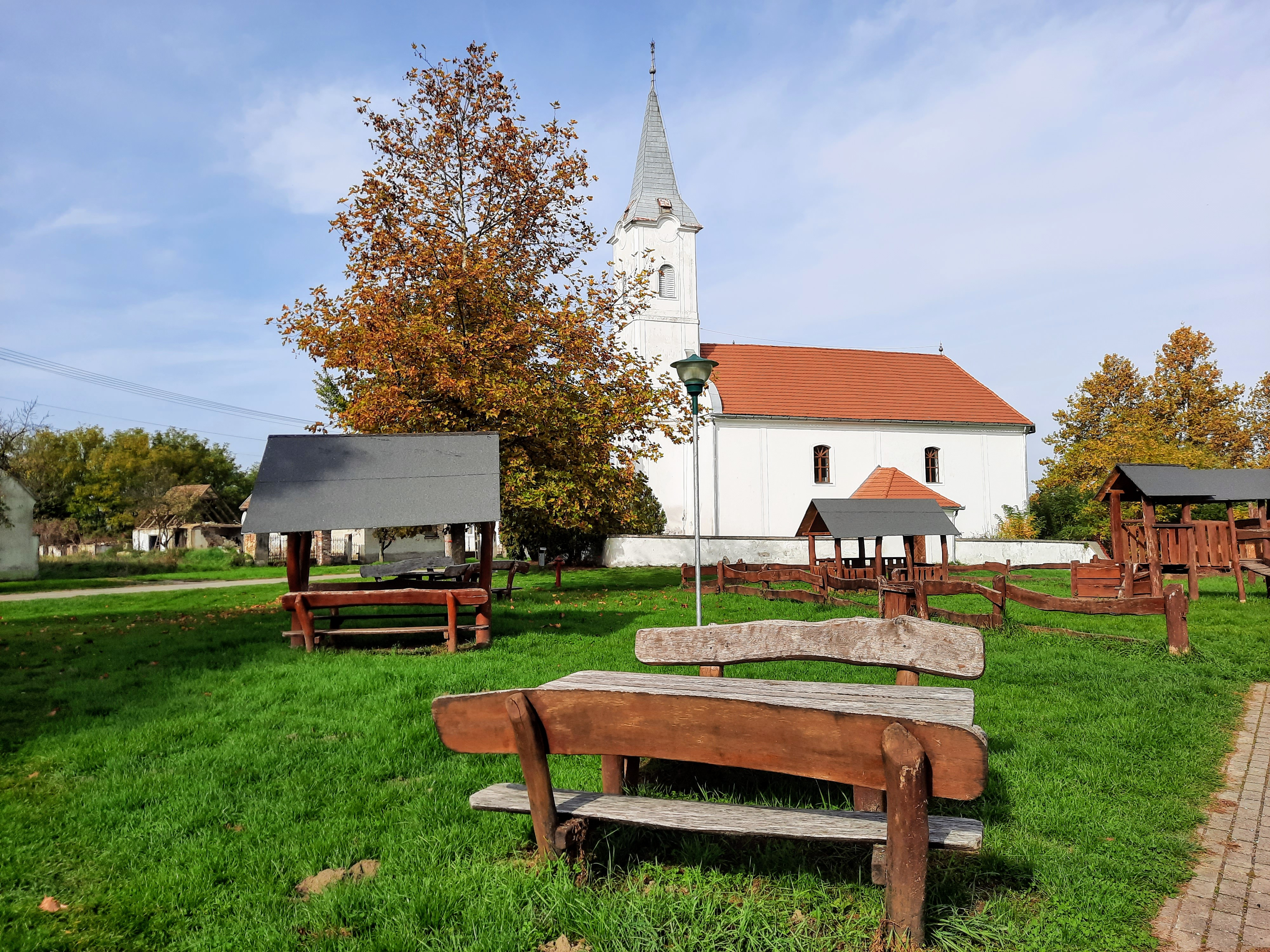
- Park and church
- Interactive map of Egyházasharaszti
- Coordinates: 45°49′N 18°20′E
- Country: Hungary
- County: Baranya
- Time zone: UTC+1 (CET)
  - Summer (DST): UTC+2 (CEST)

Egyházasharaszti is a village in Baranya county, Hungary.
