= Old, Hungary =

Old
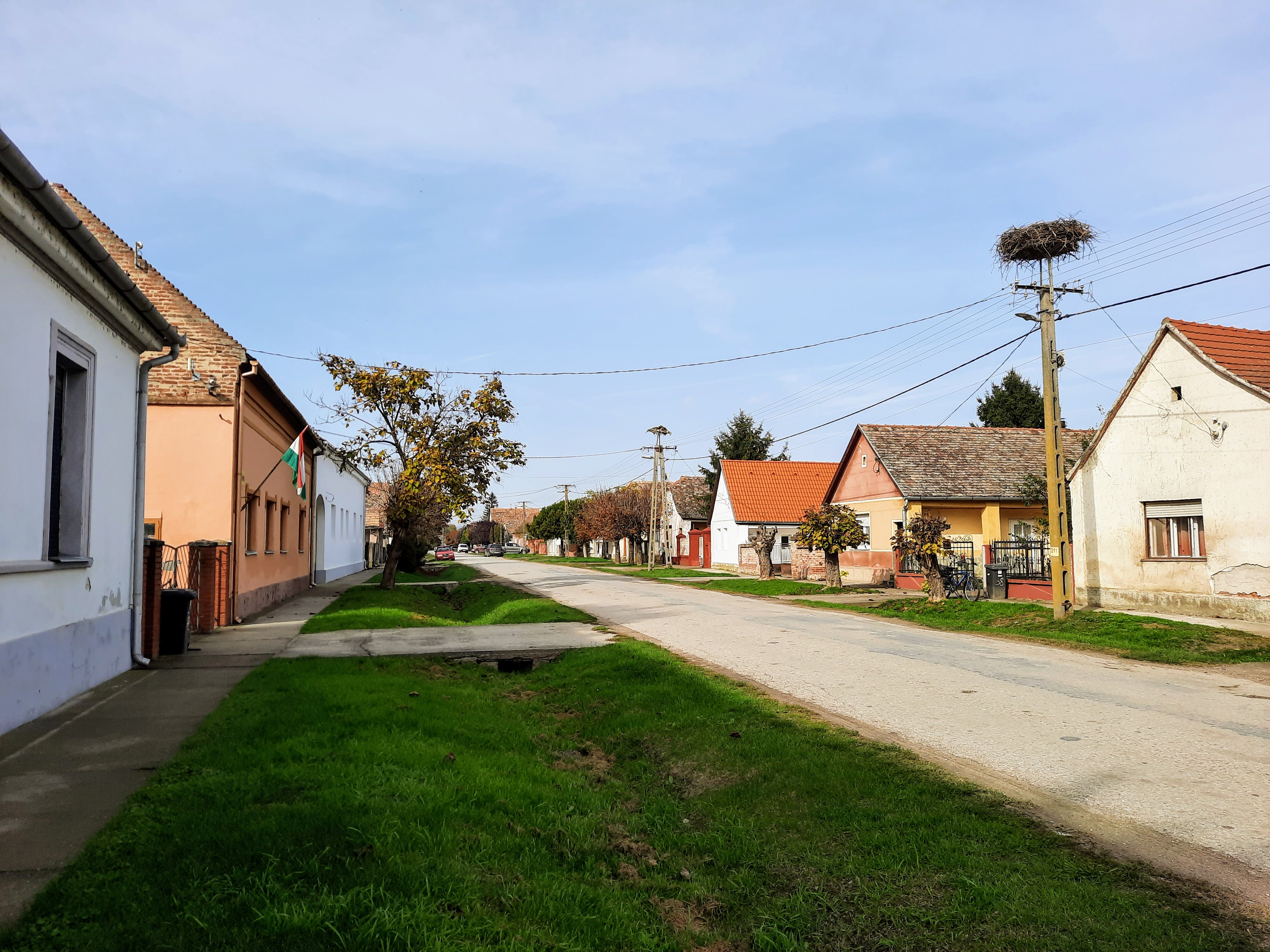

- Location of Old, Hungary
- Coordinates: 45.78968°N 18.35148°E
- Country: Hungary
- County: Baranya

Area
  - Total: 14.07 km^{2} (5.43 sq mi)

Population (2022)
  - Total: 312
  - Density: 22.2/km^{2} (57.4/sq mi)
- Time zone: UTC+1 (CET)
  - Summer (DST): UTC+2 (CEST)
- Postal code: 7824
- Area code: 72

Old (Croatian: Oldince, Olnica) is a village in Baranya county, Hungary. As 2022, Old has a population of 312.
