= Peterd =

- Location of Baranya county in Hungary

- Location of Peterd
- Coordinates: 45.97327°N 18.36253°E
- Country: Hungary
- County: Baranya

Area
  - Total: 10.6 km^{2} (4.1 sq mi)

Population (2004)
  - Total: 215
  - Density: 20.28/km^{2} (52.5/sq mi)
- Time zone: UTC+1 (CET)
  - Summer (DST): UTC+2 (CEST)
- Postal code: 7766
- Area code: 72

Peterd (Croatian: Peterda) is a village in Baranya county, Hungary.

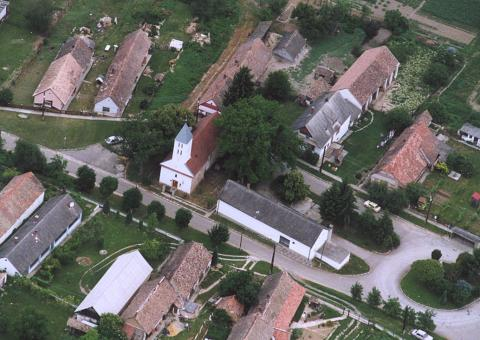
Peterd, aerial view
