= Palkonya =

Palkonya Palkan
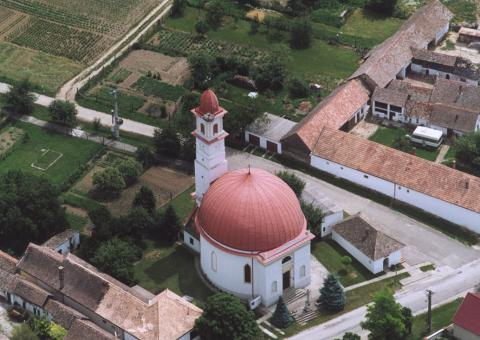
- Aerial photography: Palkonya, temple

- Location of Baranya county in Hungary

- Location of Palkonya
- Coordinates: 45.89769°N 18.39137°E
- Country: Hungary
- County: Baranya

Area
  - Total: 10 km^{2} (3.9 sq mi)

Population (2004)
  - Total: 308
  - Density: 30.8/km^{2} (80/sq mi)
- Time zone: UTC+1 (CET)
  - Summer (DST): UTC+2 (CEST)
- Postal code: 7771
- Area code: 72

Palkonya (German: Palkan; Croatian: Plakinja or Palkonija) is a village in Baranya County, Hungary. This village was once settled by Turks in Hungary until 1699 and the church was once a mosque. Until the end of World War II, the majority of the inhabitants was Danube Swabian, also called locally as Stifolder, because their ancestors arrived in the 17th and 18th centuries from Fulda (district). Most of the former German settlers were expelled to Allied-occupied Germany and Allied-occupied Austria in 1945–1948, consequent to the Potsdam Agreement. Only a few Germans of Hungary live there, the majority today are the descendants of Hungarians from the Czechoslovak–Hungarian population exchange. They got the houses of the former Danube Swabian inhabitants.
