= Magyarbóly =

- Village
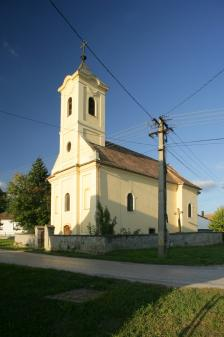
- Magyarbóly
- Interactive map of Magyarbóly
- Coordinates: 45°51′N 18°29′E
- Country: Hungary
- County: Baranya
- Time zone: UTC+1 (CET)
  - Summer (DST): UTC+2 (CEST)

Magyarbóly (Serbian: Маџарбоја, romanized: Madžarboja), (German: Ungarisch-Bohl) is a village in Baranya county, Hungary. The actor István Iglódi was born here. Majority residents are Magyars, with minority of Serbs.

At the end of World War II, the Danube Swabian (Schwowe) inhabitants of this village were expelled to Allied-occupied Germany and Allied-occupied Austria in 1945-1948, pursuant to the Potsdam Agreement.
