= Nagytótfalu =

- Village
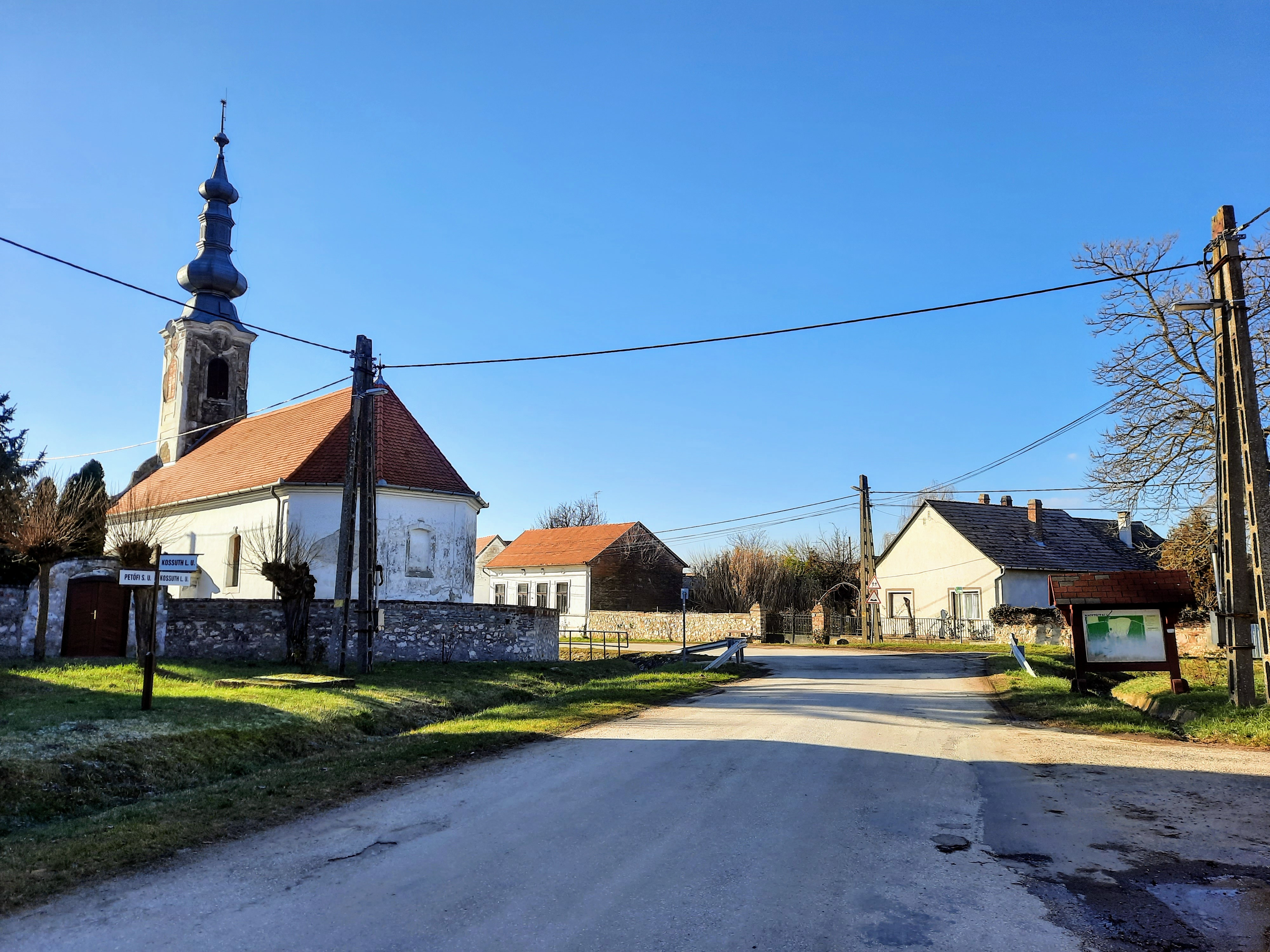
- Interactive map of Nagytótfalu
- Coordinates: 45°52′N 18°21′E
- Country: Hungary
- County: Baranya

Population (2025)
  - Total: 315
- Time zone: UTC+1 (CET)
  - Summer (DST): UTC+2 (CEST)

Nagytótfalu is a village in Baranya county, Hungary.
