= Kisharsány =

- Village
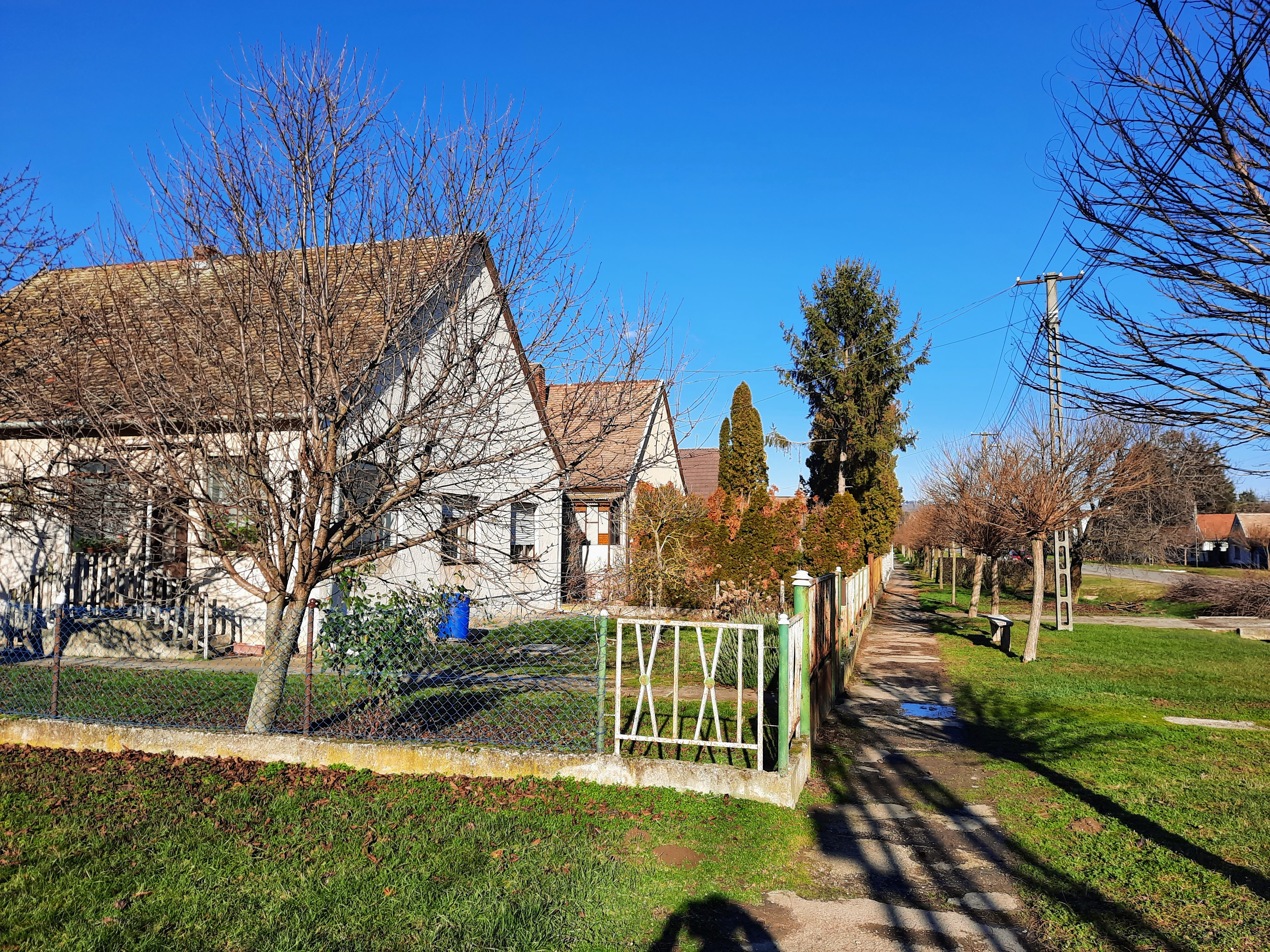

- Coat of arms
- Interactive map of Kisharsány
- Coordinates: 45°52′N 18°22′E
- Country: Hungary
- County: Baranya

Population (2025)
  - Total: 444
- Time zone: UTC+1 (CET)
  - Summer (DST): UTC+2 (CEST)

Kisharsány is a village in Baranya county, Hungary.
