= Villánykövesd =

Villánykövesd Gowisch
- Village (Falva)
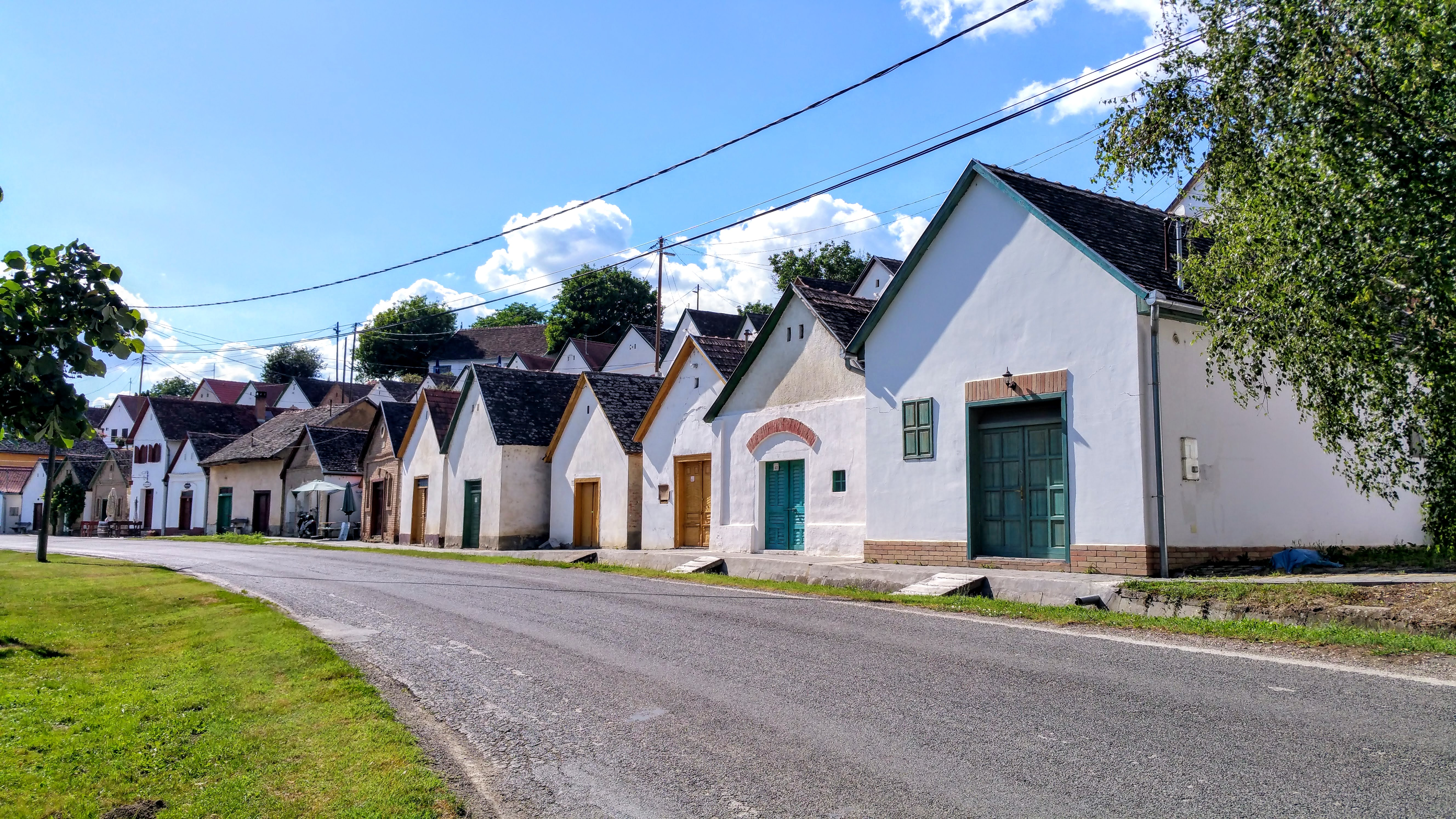
- Interactive map of Villánykövesd
- Coordinates: 45°53′N 18°26′E
- Country: Hungary
- County: Baranya
- Time zone: UTC+1 (CET)
  - Summer (DST): UTC+2 (CEST)

Villánykövesd (German: Gowisch) is a wine-village in Baranya county, Hungary, established 1730 by German settlers. Until the end of World War II, the inhabitants were all Roman Catholic Danube Swabians (Schwowe), also called locally as Stifulder, because the majority of their ancestors had arrived in the 17th and 18th centuries from Fulda (district). Most of the former German settlers were expelled to Allied-occupied Germany and Allied-occupied Austria in 1945–1948, consequent to the Potsdam Agreement.
