= Kiskassa =

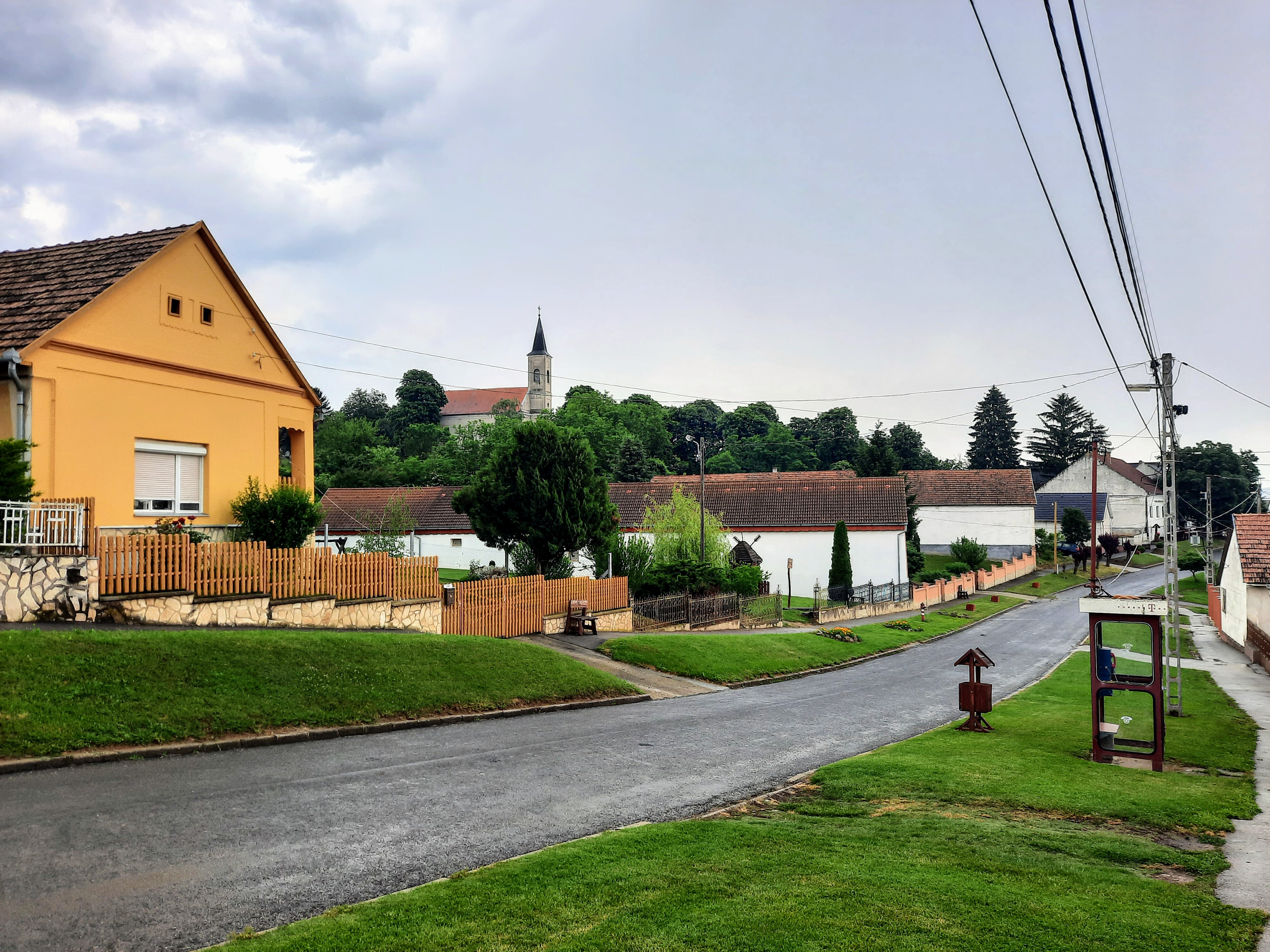

- Location of Baranya county in Hungary

- Location of Kiskassa
- Coordinates: 45.95299°N 18.39907°E
- Country: Hungary
- County: Baranya

Area
  - Total: 13.33 km^{2} (5.15 sq mi)

Population (2004)
  - Total: 282
  - Density: 21.15/km^{2} (54.8/sq mi)
- Time zone: UTC+1 (CET)
  - Summer (DST): UTC+2 (CEST)
- Postal code: 7766
- Area code: 72

Kiskassa (Croatian: Kaša) is a village in Baranya county, Hungary. It is located 17 kilometers to the south-east of the city Pécs, the capital city of Baranya. Until the end of World War II, the majority of the inhabitants was Danube Swabian, also called locally as Stifolder, because their ancestors had arrived in the 17th and 18th centuries from Fulda (district). Most of the former German settlers were expelled to Allied-occupied Germany and Allied-occupied Austria in 1945–1948, under the Potsdam Agreement. Only a few Germans of Hungary live there, the majority today are the descendants of Hungarians from the Czechoslovak–Hungarian population exchange. They got the houses of the former Danube Swabian inhabitants.
