= Baranya County (former) =

County of the Kingdom of Hungary

Baranya County Comitatus Baranyiensis (Latin) Baranya vármegye (Hungarian) Komitat Baranya (German) Baranjska županija (Croatian) Барањска жупанија (Serbian)
- County of the Kingdom of Hungary (1000-1541, 1699-1946)
- Coat of arms

- Capital: Pécs
- Area
  - Coordinates: 46°5′N 18°14′E
  - 1910: 5,176 km^{2} (1,998 sq mi)
  - 1930: 4,033 km^{2} (1,557 sq mi)
- Population
  - 1910: 352,478
  - 1930: 311,660
- History
  - Established: 1000
  - Ottoman conquest: 1541
  - County recreated: 1699
  - Treaty of Trianon: 4 June 1920
  - Recover remaining parts of Baranya County: 11 April 1941
  - Monarchy abolished: 1 February 1946
- Today part of: Hungary (4,033 km^{2}); Croatia (1,143 km^{2})

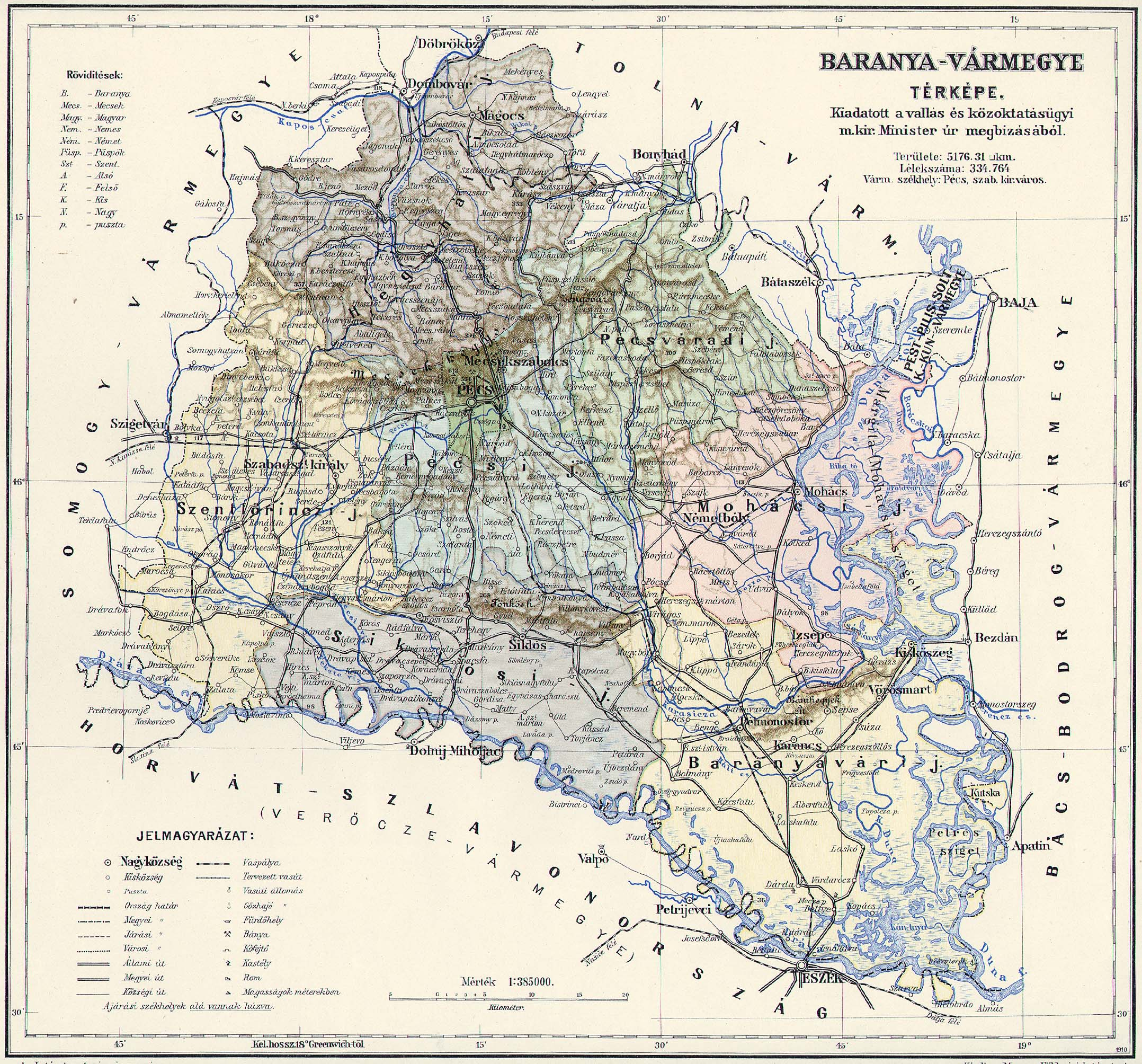
Baranya County in the 20th century

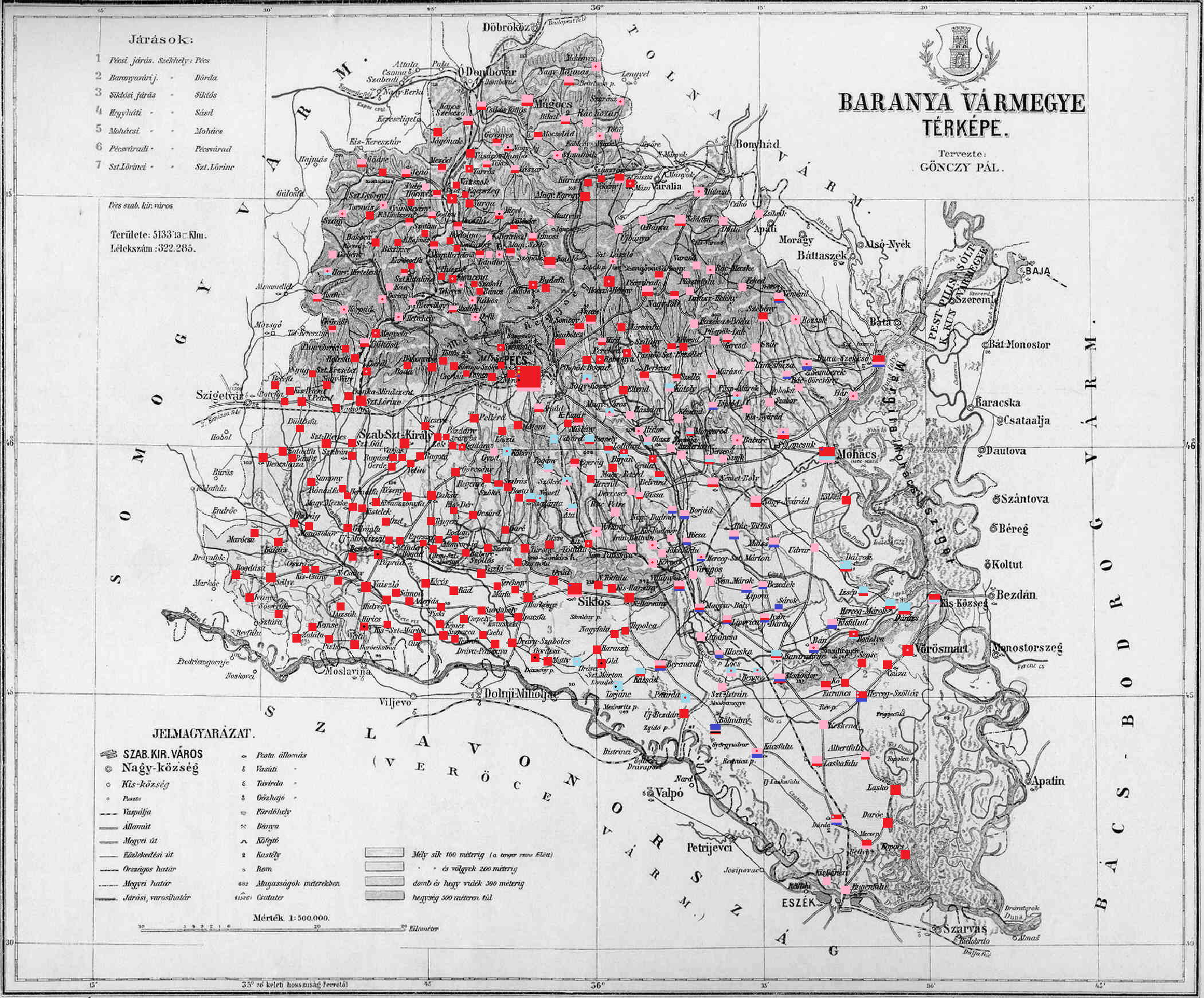
Ethnic map of the county with data of the 1910 census (see the key in the description)

Baranya (Hungarian: Baranya, Croatian: Baranja, Serbian: Барања / Baranja, German: Branau) was an administrative county (comitatus) of the Kingdom of Hungary. Its territory is now divided between present-day Baranya County of Hungary and Osijek-Baranja County of Croatia. The capital of the county was Pécs.

== Geography ==
Baranya county was located in Baranya region. It shared borders with the Hungarian counties Somogy, Tolna, Bács-Bodrog and Verőce (the latter county was part of Croatia-Slavonia). The county stretched along the rivers Drava (north bank) and Danube (west bank), up to their confluence. Its area was 5,176 km^{2} around 1910.

== Historical background ==
Baranya county arose as one of the first counties of the Kingdom of Hungary, in the 11th century. Stephen I of Hungary founded an episcopal seat here. In the 15th century, Janus Pannonius was the Bishop of Pécs. In the 16th century, the Ottoman Empire conquered Baranya, and included it in the sanjak of Mohács, an Ottoman administrative unit, with the seat Turks in Hungary in the city of Mohács.

== History ==
At the end of the 17th century, Baranya was captured by the Habsburg monarchy, and was included in the Habsburg Kingdom of Hungary after the Battle of Mohács (1687). Under the Habsburg rule, German settlers were taken from different parts of Germany, the so-called Danube Swabians.

The Stifolder or Stiffoller Shvove are a Roman Catholic subgroup of the so-called Danube Swabians. Their ancestors arrived ca. 1717–1804 from the Hochstift Fulda and surroundings, (Roman Catholic Diocese of Fulda), and settled in Baranya. They held their own German dialect and culture until the end of WW II; after the war, the majority of Danube Swabians was expelled to Allied-occupied Germany and Allied-occupied Austria subsequent to the Potsdam Agreement. Only a few people can speak the old Stiffolerisch Schvovish dialect. Also a salami is named after these people.

In 1918, the entire Baranya was captured by Serbian troops and was administered by the newly created Kingdom of Serbs, Croats and Slovenes, but as a Republic, see: Baranya-Baja Republic.

By the Treaty of Trianon of 1920, the territory of the county was divided between the Kingdom of Serbs, Croats and Slovenes (renamed to Yugoslavia in 1929) and Hungary. The south-east of the county was assigned to the Kingdom of Serbs, Croats and Slovenes, while the remainder was assigned to Hungary.

The former Yugoslav part of the pre-1920 county was occupied and annexed by Hungary during World War II and the pre-1920 borders of Baranya county were restored in 1941. The post-1920 borders were restored again after World War II and the territory of the county reduced again.

Until the end of World War II, the inhabitants were all Catholic Danube Swabians, also called locally as Stifolder, because the majority of their ancestors arrived in the 17th and 18th centuries from Fulda (district). Most of the former German settlers were expelled to Allied-occupied Germany and Allied-occupied Austria in 1945–1948, consequent to the Potsdam Agreement. Anyway a big Germans of Hungary Minority live in Baranya today.

Since 1991, when Croatia became independent from Yugoslavia, the Yugoslav part of pre-1920 Baranya county is part of Croatia. Between 1991 and 1995 it was under occupation of rebel Croatian Serbs, while from 1995 through 1998 the United Nations administered that area (United Nations Transitional Administration for Eastern Slavonia, Baranja and Western Sirmium) as a transitional body. In modern times there is a Magyar and Serb minority in Croatian Baranja and a Croatian minority in Hungarian Baranya. Roma minority is present in both parts, as well as Germans (mostly until 1945). Today, the present Hungarian county of Baranya also include some lands in the west that were not part of the historic Baranya county (after World War II most of the district of Szigetvár – previously part of Somogy county – and some other localities was transferred to Baranya county).

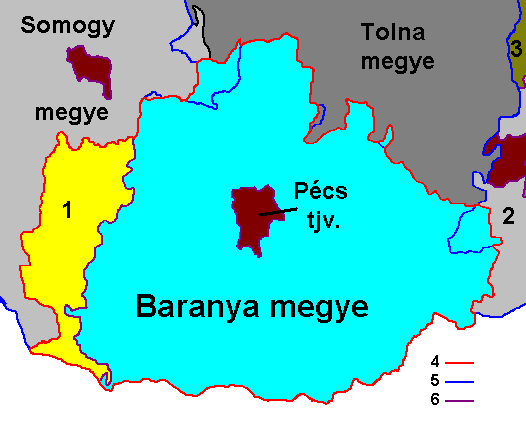
The formation of modern Baranya County. (1) Territory assigned from Somogy County to Baranya County in 1950.

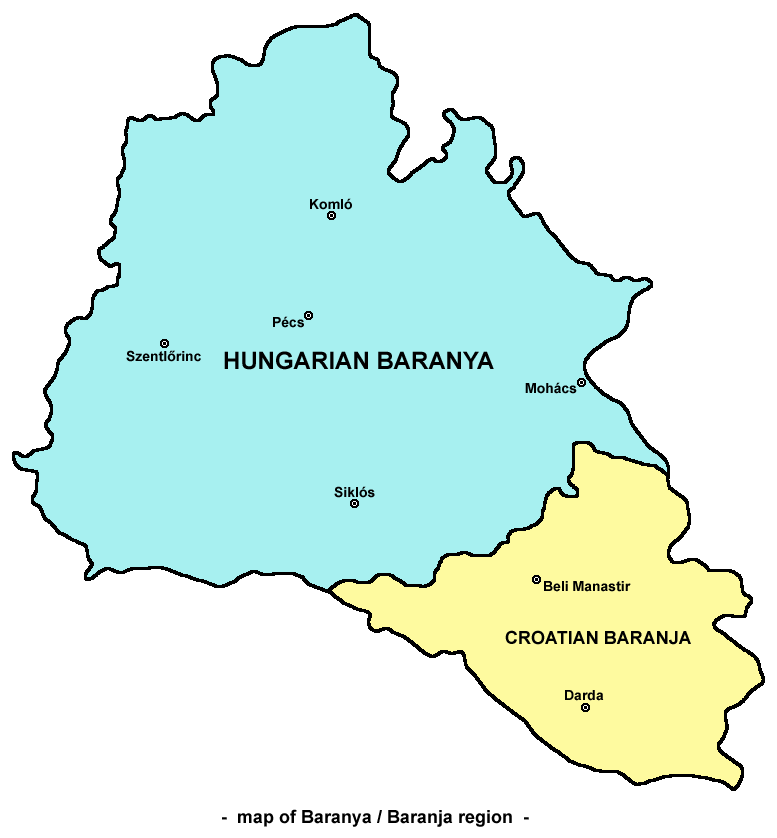

== Demographics ==
In 1900, the county had a population of 334,764 people and was composed of the following linguistic communities:

Total:

- Hungarian: 183,042 (54.7%)
- Danube Swabians: 111,051 (33.2%)
- Croatian: 15,431 (4.6%)
- Serbian: 12,856 (3.8%)
- Slovak: 482 (0.1%)
- Romanian: 47 (0.0%)
- Ruthenian: 10 (0.0%)
- Other or unknown: 11,845 (3.6%)

According to the census of 1900, the county was composed of the following religious communities:

Total:

- Roman Catholic (term): 253,686 (75.8%)
- Calvinist: 43,014 (12.9%)
- Lutheran: 14,252 (4.3%)
- Greek Orthodox: 13,520 (4.0%)
- Jewish: 9,260 (2.8%)
- Greek Catholic: 201 (0.0%)
- Unitarian: 105 (0.0%)
- Other or unknown: 726 (0.2%)

In 1910, the county had a population of 352,478 people and was composed of the following linguistic communities:

- Hungarian: 199,659 (56.6%)
- Danube Swabians German: 112,297 (31.9%)
- Serbian: 13,048 (3.7%)
- Croatian: 10,159 (2,9)
- Slovak: 392 (0.1%)
- Romanian: 54 (0.0%)
- Ruthenian: 5 (0.0%)
- Other: 16,864 (4.8%) (Note: Mostly Šokci)

According to the census of 1910, the county was composed of the following religious communities:

- Roman Catholic: 272,866 (77.4%)
- Calvinist: 41,201 (11.7%)
- Lutheran: 14,617 (4.2%)
- Greek Orthodox: 14,114 (4,0)
- Jewish: 8,828 (2.5%)
- Greek Catholic: 239 (0.0%)
- Unitarian: 89 (0.0%)
- Other: 524 (0.2%)

== Subdivisions ==
In the early 20th century, the subdivisions of Baranya county were:

Districts (járás)			Population by 1910 census	
District	Capital	Settlements	Population by ethnicity	Population by religion
Baranyavár District	Dárda	Albertfalu • Baranyabán • Baranyaszentistván • Baranyavár • Bellye • Benge • Bezedek • Bolmány • Csúza • Dárda • Hercegszentmárton • Hercegszőlős • Illocska • Ivándárda • Jenőfalva • Kácsfalu • Karancs • Keskend • Kisdárda • Kiskőszeg • Kislippó • Kopács • Kő • Lapáncsa • Laskafalu • Laskó • Lippó • Lőcs • Magyarbóly • Németmárok • Pélmonostor • Sárok • Sepse • Várdaróc • Villány • Virágos • Vörösmart	total: 49,135: 1. Germans of Hungary 19,804 (40.3%); 2. Hungarians 18,203 (37.0%); 3. Serbs in Hungary 7,226 (14.7%); 4. Šokci 2,753 (5.60%); 5. Croats of Hungary 486 (0.98%); 6. Romani people in Hungary 439 (0.89%); 7. Slovaks in Hungary 63 (0.12%); 8. Romanians in Hungary 6 (0.01%); 9. Others 155 (0.31%)	total: 49,135: 1. Roman Catholics 31,892 (64.9%); 2. Eastern orthodox 7,623 (15.5%); 3. Calvinists 6,701 (13.6%); 4. Lutherans 1,961 (3.99%); 5. Jewish 719 (1.46%); 6. Eastern catholics 31 (0.06%); 7. Unitarians 3 (0.00%); 8. Others 205 (0.41%)
Hegyhát District	Sásd	Abaliget • Ág • Alsómocsolád • Bakóca • Bános • Baranyajenő • Baranyaszentgyörgy • Barátúr • Bikal • Császta • Csikóstőttős • Egyházbér • Felsőegerszeg • Felsőmindszent • Gerényes • Godisa • Gödre • Gödreszentmárton • Gyümölcsény • Hegyhátmaróc • Hetvehely • Hörnyék • Husztót • Jágónak • Kán • Kaposszekcső • Karácodfa • Kárász • Kisbattyán • Kisbeszterce • Kisbodolya • Kishajmás • Kishertelend • Kisvaszar • Komló • Kovácsszénája • Köblény • Liget • Mágocs • Magyaregregy • Magyarhertelend • Magyarszék • Mánfa • Mecsekjánosi • Mecsekpölöske • Mecsekrákos • Mecsekszakál • Mekényes • Meződ • Nagyhajmás • Németszék • Okorvölgy • Orfű • Oroszló • Palé • Pécsbudafa • Ráckozár • Sásd • Szágy • Szalatnak • Szárász • Szászvár • Szatina • Szentkatalin • Szopok • Tarrós • Tekeres • Tékes • Tófű • Tormás • Varga • Vásárosdombó • Vázsnok • Vékény	total: 46,882: 1. Hungarians 23,256 (49.6%); 2. Germans of Hungary 22,972 (49.0%); 3. Romani people in Hungary 386 (0.82%); 4. Croats of Hungary 72 (0.15%); 5. Slovaks in Hungary 25 (0.05%); 6. Serbs in Hungary 9 (0.01%); 7. Romanians in Hungary 3 (0.00%); 8. Others 159 (0.33%)	total: 46,882: 1. Roman Catholics 38,949 (83.1%); 2. Lutherans 7,187 (15.3%); 3. Jewish 528 (1.12%); 4. Calvinists 168 (0.35%); 5. Eastern orthodox 15 (0.03%); 6. Eastern catholics 9 (0.01%); 7. Unitarians 5 (0.01%); 8. Others 21 (0.04%)
Mohács District	Mohács	Babarc • Bár • Baranyakisfalud • Borjád • Cseledoboka • Dályok • Darázs • Dunaszekcső • Hercegmárok • Hercegszabar • Izsép • Kisnyárád • Kölked • Lánycsók • Liptód • Majs • Mohács • Nagybodolya • Nagynyárád • Németbóly • Pócsa • Rácgörcsöny • Ráctőttős • Somberek • Szajk • Udvar • Versend	total: 56,909: 1. Germans of Hungary 21,951 (38.6%); 2. Hungarians 20,699 (36.4%); 3. Šokci 9,219 (16.2%); 4. Serbs in Hungary 4,312 (7.57%); 5. Croats of Hungary 421 (0.73%); 6. Romani people in Hungary 136 (0.23%); 7. Slovaks in Hungary 24 (0.04%); 8. Romanians 2 (0.00%); 9. Others 145 (0.25%)	total: 56,909: 1. Roman Catholics 48,028 (84.4%); 2. Eastern orthodox 4,535 (7.96%); 3. Calvinists 2,338 (4.10%); 4. Jewish 1,319 (2.31%); 5. Lutherans 571 (1.00%); 6. Eastern catholics 32 (0.05%); 7. Unitarians 3 (0.00%); 8. Others 83 (0.14%)
Pécs District	Pécs			
Pécsvárad District	Pécsvárad			
Siklós District	Siklós			
Szentlőrinc District	Szentlőrinc			
Urban counties (törvényhatósági jogú város)
Pécs
