= Komló District =

Coordinates: 46.192361853655406°N 18.2516546524172°E

Komló District Komlói járás
- Districts of Hungary
- Coat of arms

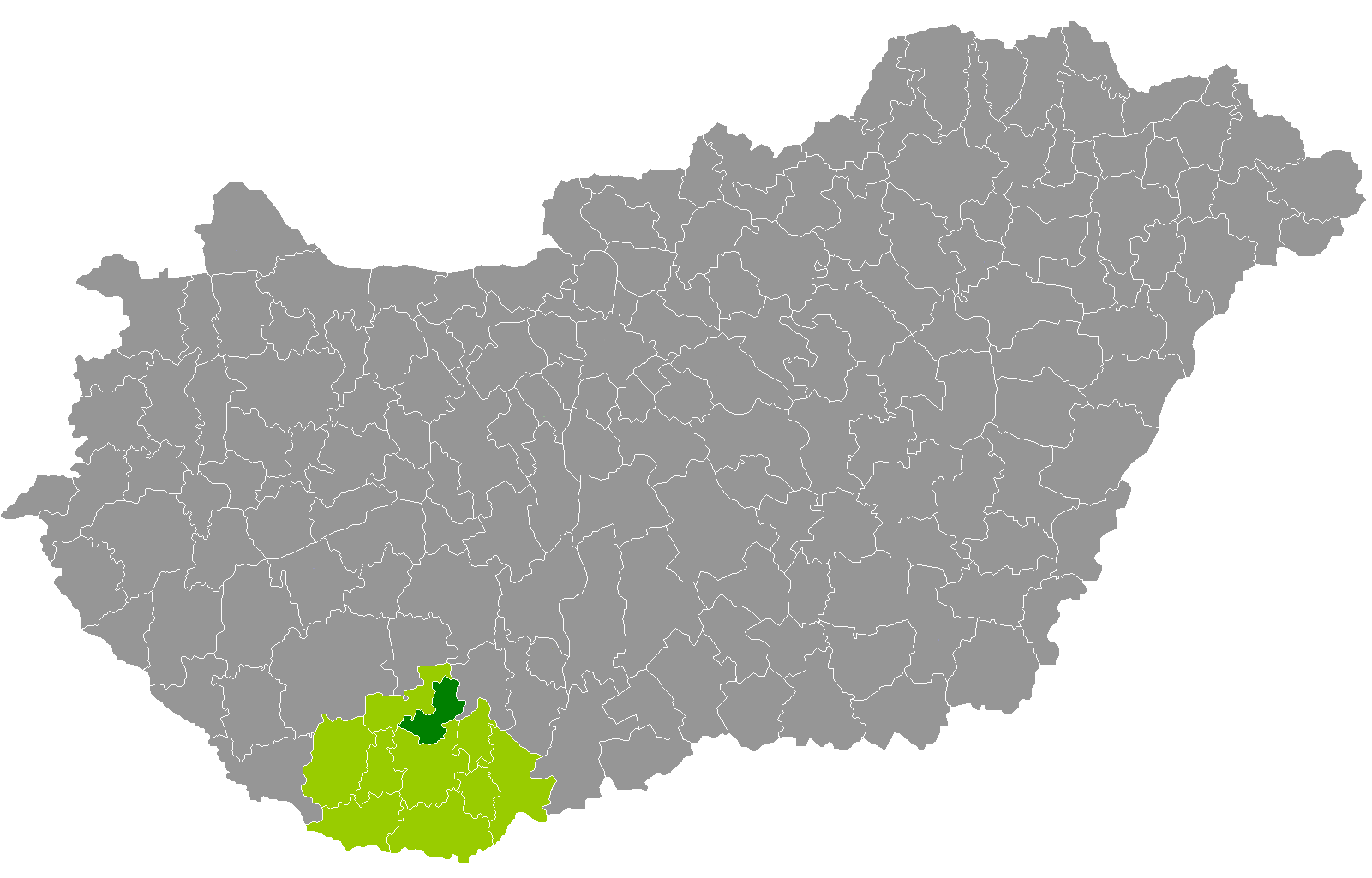
- Komló District within Hungary and Baranya County.
- Country: Hungary
- County: Baranya
- District seat: Komló

Area
  - Total: 292.48 km^{2} (112.93 sq mi)
  - Rank: 7th in Baranya

Population (2011 census)
  - Total: 35,489
  - Rank: 3rd in Baranya
  - Density: 121/km^{2} (310/sq mi)

Komló (Hungarian: Komlói járás) is a district in northern part of Baranya County, in Hungary. Komló is also the name of the town where the district seat is located. The district lies in the Southern Transdanubia Statistical Region.

== Geography ==
Komló District borders with Bonyhád District (Tolna County) to the east, Pécs District to the south, Hegyhát District to the west and north. The number of the inhabited places in Komló District is 20.

== Municipalities ==
The district has 1 town, 1 large village and 18 villages. (ordered by population, as of 1 January 2012)

- Bikal (743)
- Bodolyabér (222)
- Egyházaskozár (792)
- Hegyhátmaróc (133)
- Kárász (317)
- **Komló** (25,020) – district seat
- Köblény (227)
- Liget (419)
- Magyaregregy (717)
- Magyarhertelend (627)
- Magyarszék (1,085)
- Mánfa (843)
- Máza (1,226)
- Mecsekpölöske (412)
- Oroszló (313)
- Szalatnak (330)
- Szárász (25)
- Szászvár (2,334)
- Tófű (110)
- Vékény (145)

The bolded municipality is city, italics municipality is large village.

== See also ==
- List of cities and towns in Hungary
