= Mohács District =

Mohács District Mohácsi járás
- Districts of Hungary
- Coat of arms

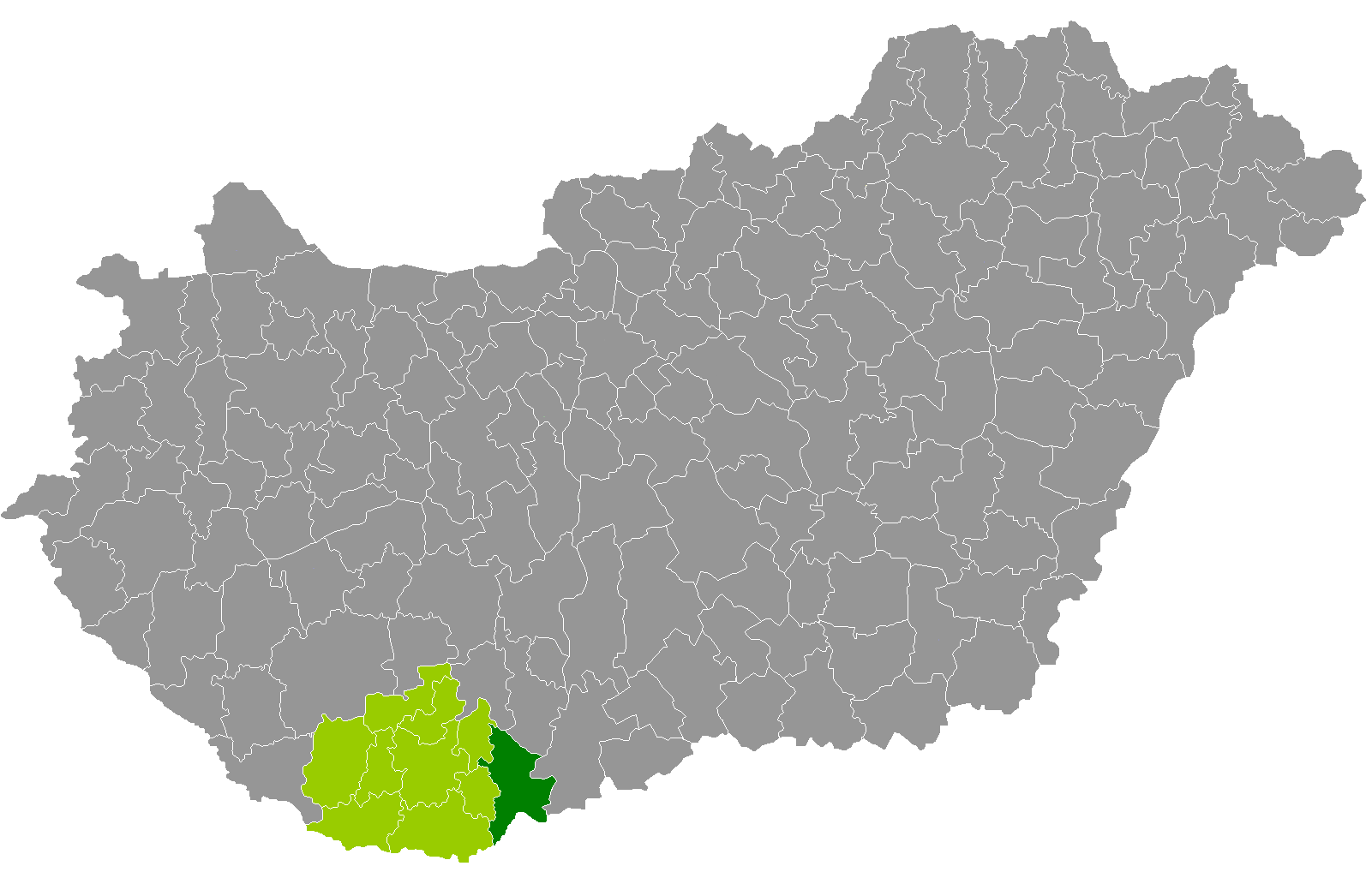
- Mohács District within Hungary and Baranya County.
- Coordinates: 46.0000°N 18.6800°E
- Country: Hungary
- County: Baranya
- District seat: Mohács

Area
  - Total: 600.98 km^{2} (232.04 sq mi)
  - Rank: 4th in Baranya

Population (2011 census)
  - Total: 35,164
  - Rank: 4th in Baranya
  - Density: 59/km^{2} (150/sq mi)

Mohács (Hungarian: Mohácsi járás) is a district in eastern part of Baranya County, Hungary. Mohács is also the name of the town where the district seat is located. The district is in the Southern Transdanubia Statistical Region.

== Geography ==
Mohács District borders with Bonyhád District and Szekszárd District (Tolna County) to the north, Baja District (Bács-Kiskun County) to the east, the Croatian county of Osijek-Baranja to the south, Siklós District, Bóly District and Pécsvárad District to the west. The number of the inhabited places in Mohács District is 26.

== Municipalities ==
The district has 1 town and 25 villages. (ordered by population, as of 1 January 2012)

- Bár (534)
- Bezedek (238)
- Dunaszekcső (1,932)
- Erdősmárok (89)
- Feked (165)
- Görcsönydoboka (387)
- Himesháza (1,078)
- Homorúd (620)
- Ivándárda (255)
- Kisnyárád (185)
- Kölked (1,033)
- Lánycsók (2,489)
- Lippó (446)
- Majs (939)
- Maráza (177)
- **Mohács** (18,604) – district seat
- Nagynyárád (719)
- Palotabozsok (913)
- Sárok (109)
- Sátorhely (642)
- Somberek (1,394)
- Szebény (373)
- Székelyszabar (586)
- Szűr (275)
- Udvar (152)
- Véménd (1,462)

The bolded municipality is city.

== See also ==
- List of cities and towns in Hungary
