= List of renamed places in Hungary =

A list of settlements in Hungary whose name was changed during the 19th or 20th century. This list contains only settlements within the present-day borders of Hungary.

The reasons for name changes are varied.

Original name	New name	Period
Alsóbodony + Felsőbodony	Kétbodony	1902
Balatonboglár + Balatonlelle	Boglárlelle	1979–1991
Bedeg + Magyarkér	Bedegkér	1939
Berektompaháza + Pórládony	Tompaládony	1941
Bernece + Baráti	Bernecebaráti	1928
Büdösfa	Rózsafa	1896
Csernelháza + Damonya	Chernelházadamonya	1925
Csév	Piliscsév	1954
Dautova	Dávod	1905
Dolány	Benczúrfalva	1927
Dunapentele	Dunaújváros	Between 1951 and 1961, Sztálinváros
Egyházasszecsőd + Németszecsőd	Magyarszecsőd	1937
Eszterháza	Fertőd	1950
Geresd + Püspöklak	Geresdlak	1968
Görögfalva	Beloiannisz	1952
Gyoma + Endrőd	Gyomaendrőd	1982
Győrszentmárton	Pannonhalma	1965
Hajdúhadház + Téglás	Hadháztéglás	1984–1987 Hadháztéglás; 1987–1991 Hajdúhadháztéglás
Harka	Magyarfalva	1947-1990 (original name restored in 1990)
Hercegfalva	Mezőfalva	1951
Hercegszabar	Székelyszabar	1950
Hete + Fejércse	Hetefejércse	1977
Hévízszentandrás + Egregy	Hévíz	1946
Jankovác	Jánoshalma	1904
Karácsonyszállás	Nagykarácsony	1952
Kerca + Szomoróc	Kercaszomor	1942
Kirva	Máriahalom	1936
Kisczell + Nemesdömölk	Celldömölk	1903
Koháryszentlőrinc	Nyárlőrinc	1950
Lesencenémetfalu	Lesencefalu	1940
Magyarújfalu + Németújfalu	Kétújfalu	1940
Mateovics	Mátételke	1904 (medieval name restored)
Merse + Belsővat	Mersevát	1906
Mogyorós	Mogyorósbánya	1907
Németbóly	Bóly	1950
Németegres	Somogyegres	1931
Németmárok	Márok	1950
Németpalkonya	Palkonya	1950
Németzsidány	Kiszsidány	1946
Őrbajánháza + Senyeháza	Bajánsenye	1939
Őrszentmiklós + Vácbottyán	Őrbottyán	1970
Permise + Ritkaháza	Kétvölgy	1944–1946 Vashegyalja; 1946–1950 Vashegyalja and Ritkaháza; 1950–1951 Ritkaháza; Since 1952 Kétvölgy
Pernyepuszta	Petőfibánya	1945–1948 Pernyebánya
Pestszenterzsébet	Pesterzsébet	Until 1924 Erzsébetfalva; 1924–1932 Pesterzsébet; 1932–1950 Pestszenterzsébet; 1950–1990 Pesterzsébet
Pestszentimre	Pestimre	Between 1950 and 1990, old name restored
Pestszentlőrinc	Pestlőrinc	Between 1950 and 1990, old name restored
Promontor	Budafok	1886
Pusztaszentmihály	Rákosszentmihály	1902
Püspökbogád	Bogád	1950
Püspöklele	Maroslele	1950
Püspökmárok	Erdősmárok	1950
Püspöknádasd	Mecseknádasd	1950
Püspökszenterzsébet	Erzsébet	1950
Püspöktamási + Rábamolnári	Püspökmolnári	1948
Rábakisfalud + Talapatka	Máriaújfalu	1934
Rácgörcsöny	Cselegörcsöny	1932 (now part of Görcsönydoboka)
Ráckozár	Egyházaskozár	1934
Rácmecske	Erdősmecske	1934
Rácpetre	Újpetre	1933
Ráctöttös	Töttös	between 1933 and 1950 Hercegtöttös
Riba	Ipolyszög	1906
Sövényháza	Ópusztaszer	1973
Szilasbalhás	Mezőszilas	1942
Szolgaegyháza	Szabadegyháza	1948
Tázlár	Prónayfalva	Between 1907-1947, old name restored
Tiszaszederkény	Tiszaújváros	Between 1970–1991 Leninváros
Tótszentpál	Somogyszentpál	1929
Trázs	Őrhalom	1906
Verőce + Kismaros	Verőcemaros	1975–1990
Zsidó	Vácegres	1943

== Uncategorised ==
- Aquincum → Budapest
- Fünfkirchen → Pécs
- Gran → Esztergom
- Ödenburg → Sopron
- Waitzen → Vác
