= Lesencefalu =

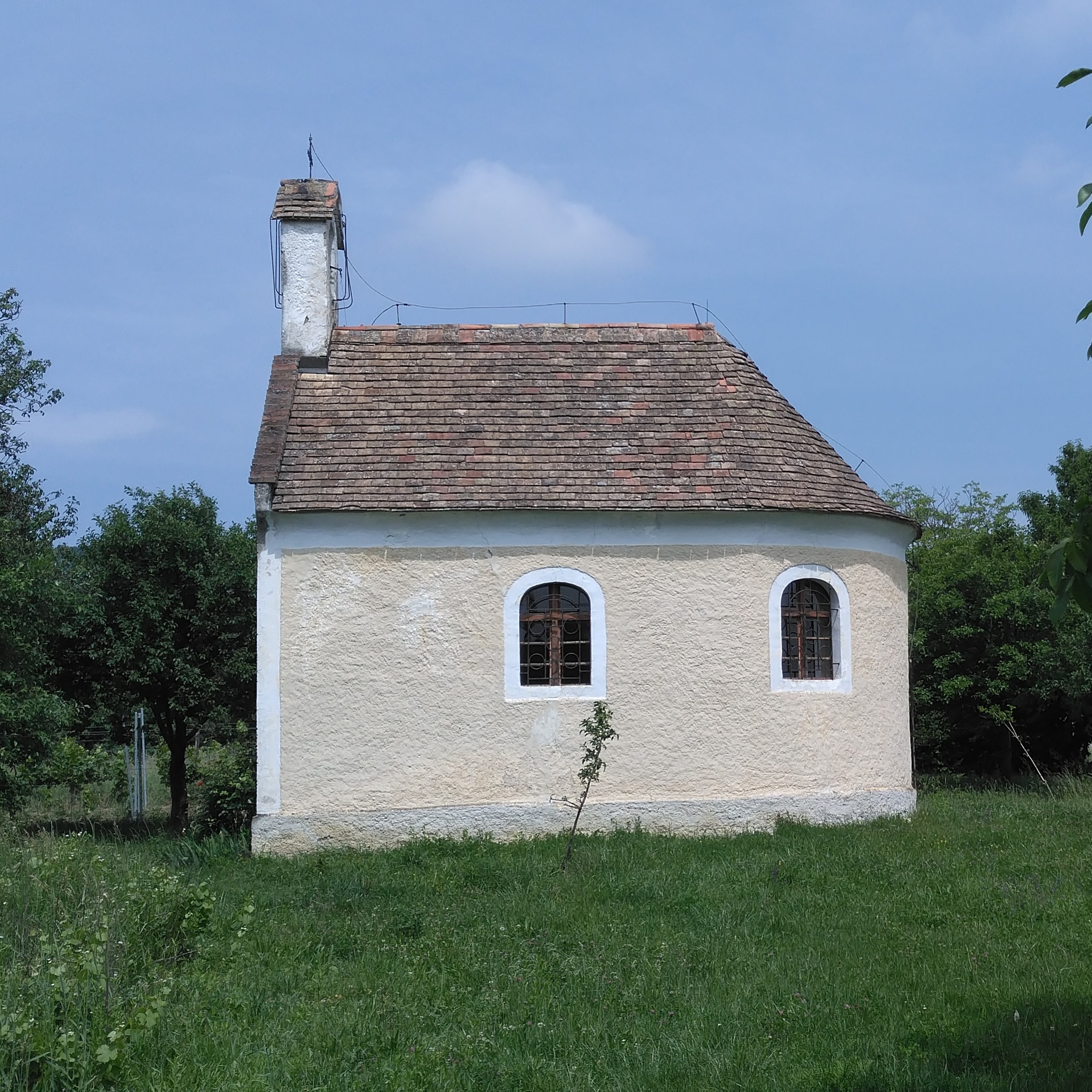
- St. Donat chapel

- Flag Coat of arms

- Location of Lesencefalu in Hungary
- Coordinates: 46.8443°N 17.3434°E
- Country: Hungary
- Region: Central Transdanubia
- County: Veszprém

Area
  - Total: 7.18 km^{2} (2.77 sq mi)

Population (2020)
  - Total: 300
  - Density: 42/km^{2} (110/sq mi)
- Time zone: UTC+1 (CET)
  - Summer (DST): UTC+2 (CEST)
- Postal code: 8318
- Area code: +36 87
- Website: https://lesencefalu.hu/

Lesencefalu is a village in Tapolca District, Veszprém county, Hungary. It is situated 8 km north of Lake Balaton between Lesencetomaj and Várvölgy. It has an area of 718 hectares and a resident population in 2020 of 300.

The village takes its name from the Lesence stream that runs through the village towards Lake Balaton. Falu is the Hungarian word for "village". Until 1940 the village was known as Lesencenémetfalu, német being the Hungarian for "German", and before 1898 it was called Németfalu.
