= Mánfa =

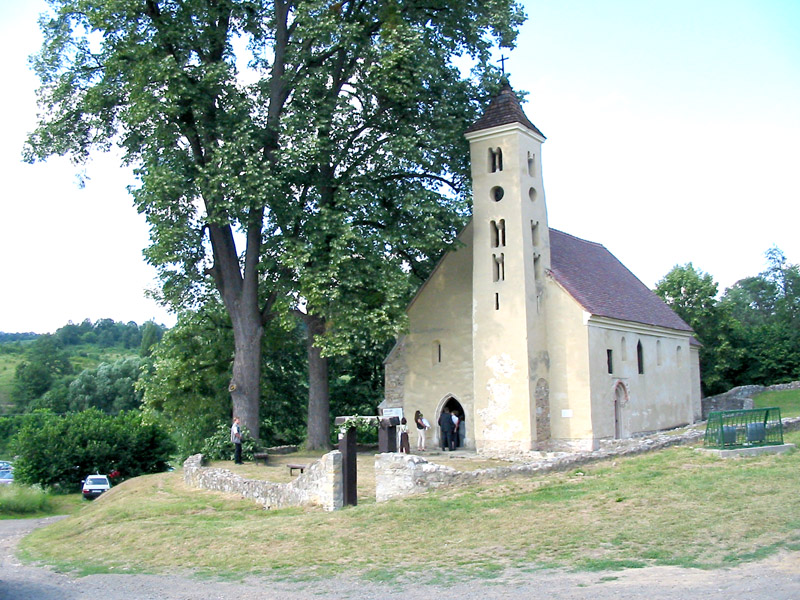
- Sarlós Boldogasszony Church of Mánfa

- Coat of arms

- Location of Mánfa in Hungary
- Coordinates: 46°09′30″N 18°14′26″E
- Country: Hungary
- Region: Southern Transdanubia
- County: Baranya
- Subregion: Komlói
- Rank: Village

Area
  - Total: 27.70 km^{2} (10.70 sq mi)

Population (1 January 2008)
  - Total: 896
  - Density: 32.3/km^{2} (83.8/sq mi)
- Time zone: UTC+1 (CET)
  - Summer (DST): UTC+2 (CEST)
- Postal code: 7304
- Area code: +36 72
- KSH code: 33923
- Website: www.manfa.hu

Mánfa is a village in Baranya county, Hungary.

== Geography ==
Mánfa is situated in the Mecsek Mountains in Southern Hungary. It can be reached by car along the No. 66 highway in the Kaposvár–Sásd–Magyarszék–Pécs line.

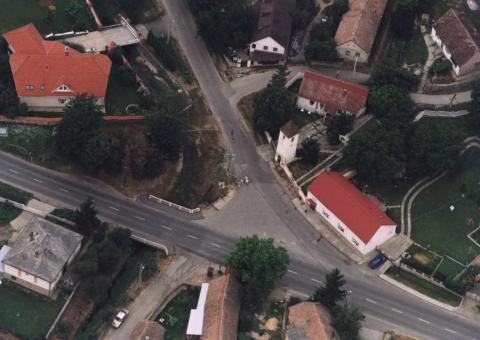
Mánfa: aerial photograph

== History ==
The village dates to the Árpád age. In 1949, it was officially combined with another village, Budafa, and the united village was attached to the town of Komló, a mining town near Pécs. In 1991, the people of Mánfa voted to separate from Komló, again making Mánfa an independent village.

== Landmarks ==
- The Árpád age romanesque church consecrated to Our Lady (Sarlós Boldogasszony)
