= Vékény =

- Village (Falva)
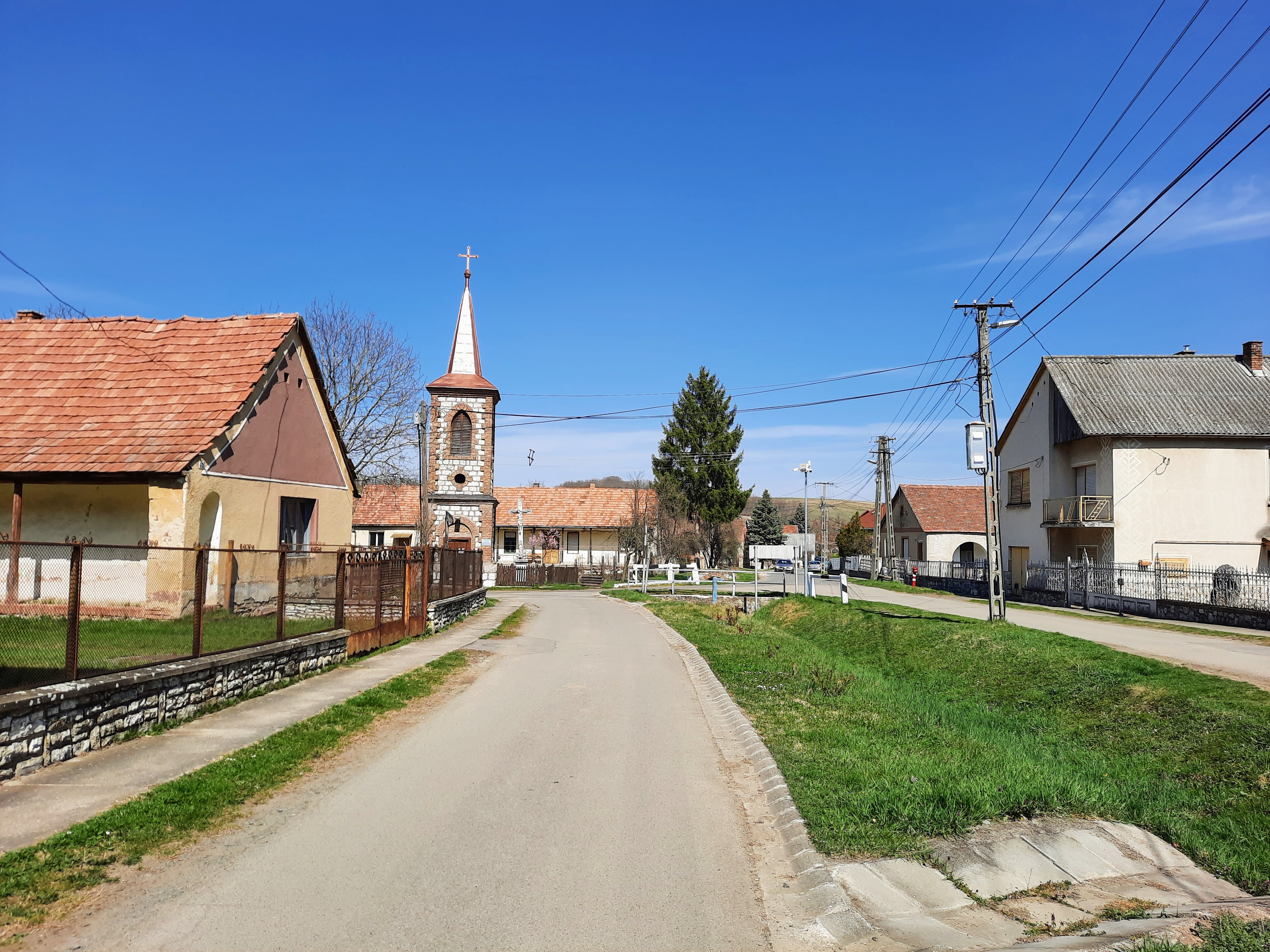

- Flag Seal

- Location of Vékény
- Coordinates: 46°16′N 18°21′E
- Country: Hungary
- County: Baranya
- District: Komló

Government
  - Type: Village
  - Mayor: Tibor Endrődi (Ind.)

Area
  - Total: 3.61 sq mi (9.36 km^{2})

Population (2015)
  - Total: 139
  - Density: 38.5/sq mi (14.9/km^{2})
- Time zone: UTC+1 (CET)
  - Summer (DST): UTC+2 (CEST)
- Postal code: 7333
- Area code: 72
- KSH code: 24402
- Website: http://www.vekeny.hu/

Vékény is a village in Baranya county, Hungary, west of Szászvár in the Komló District. As of 2015, its population was 139.
