= Hetvehely =

Hetvenhely
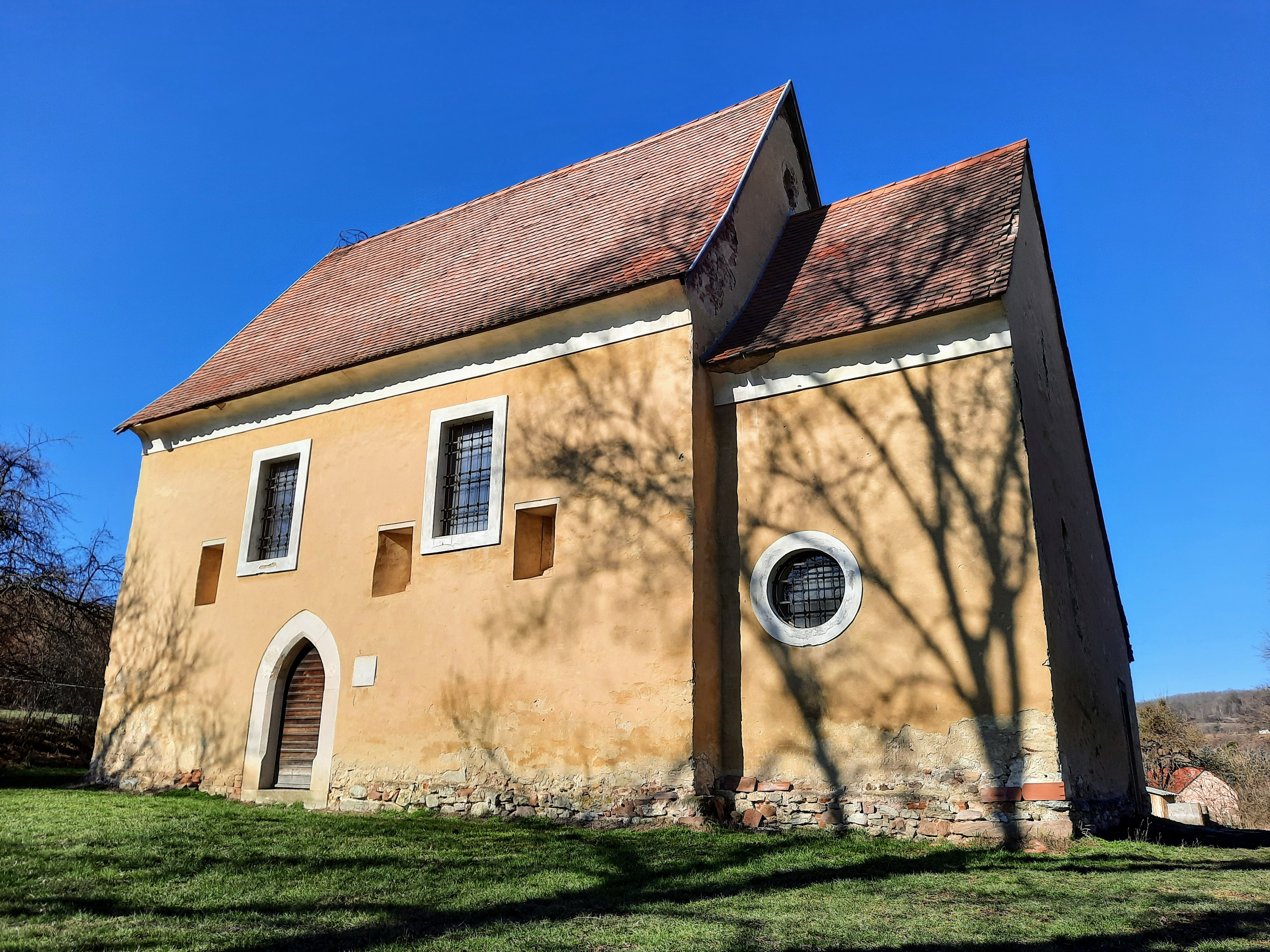

- Location of Baranya county in Hungary

- Location of Hetvenhely
- Coordinates: 46.13392°N 18.04542°E
- Country: Hungary
- County: Baranya

Area
  - Total: 21.38 km^{2} (8.25 sq mi)

Population (2004)
  - Total: 498
  - Density: 23.29/km^{2} (60.3/sq mi)
- Time zone: UTC+1 (CET)
  - Summer (DST): UTC+2 (CEST)
- Postal code: 7681
- Area code: 73

Hetvehely (Croatian: Tević) is a village in Baranya county, Hungary.
