= Görcsönydoboka =

- Village
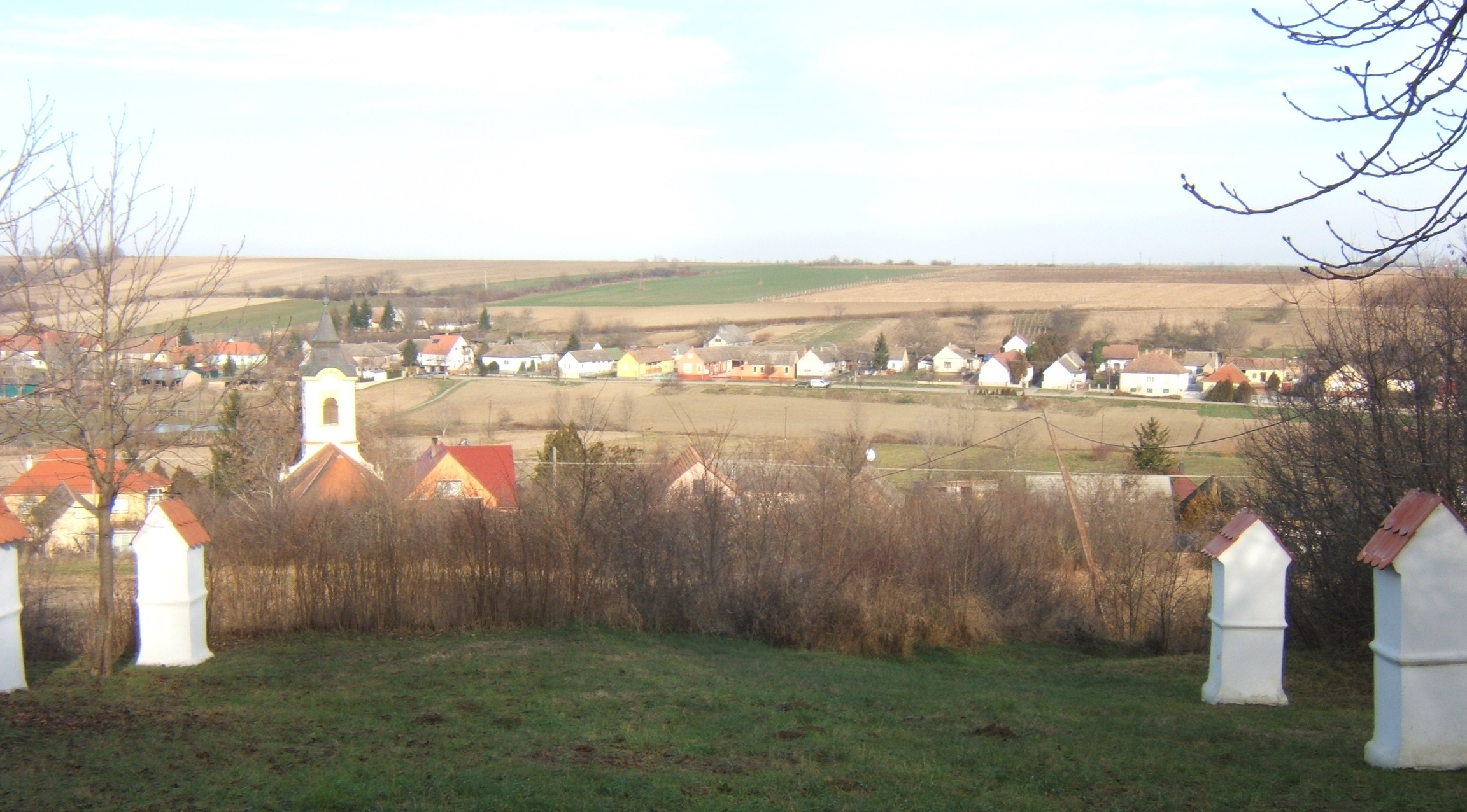
- Görcsönydoboka, látkép
- Interactive map of Görcsönydoboka
- Coordinates: 46°04′N 18°38′E
- Country: Hungary
- County: Baranya
- Time zone: UTC+1 (CET)
  - Summer (DST): UTC+2 (CEST)

Görcsönydoboka is a village in Baranya county, Hungary.
