= Köblény =

- Village
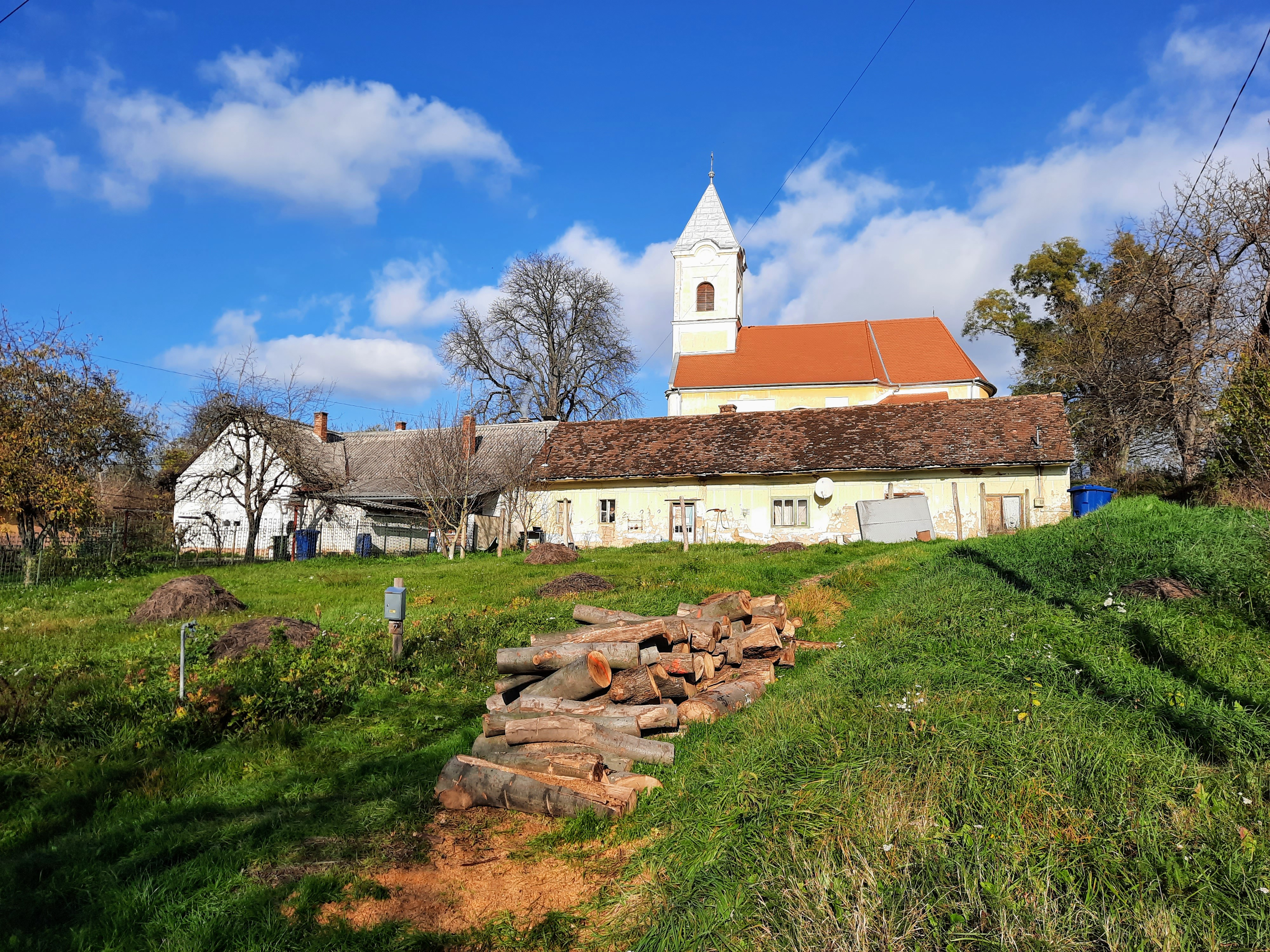
- Interactive map of Köblény
- Coordinates: 46°18′N 18°18′E
- Country: Hungary
- County: Baranya

Population (2025)
  - Total: 190
- Time zone: UTC+1 (CET)
  - Summer (DST): UTC+2 (CEST)

Köblény is a village in Baranya county, Hungary.
