= Kárász =

- Village
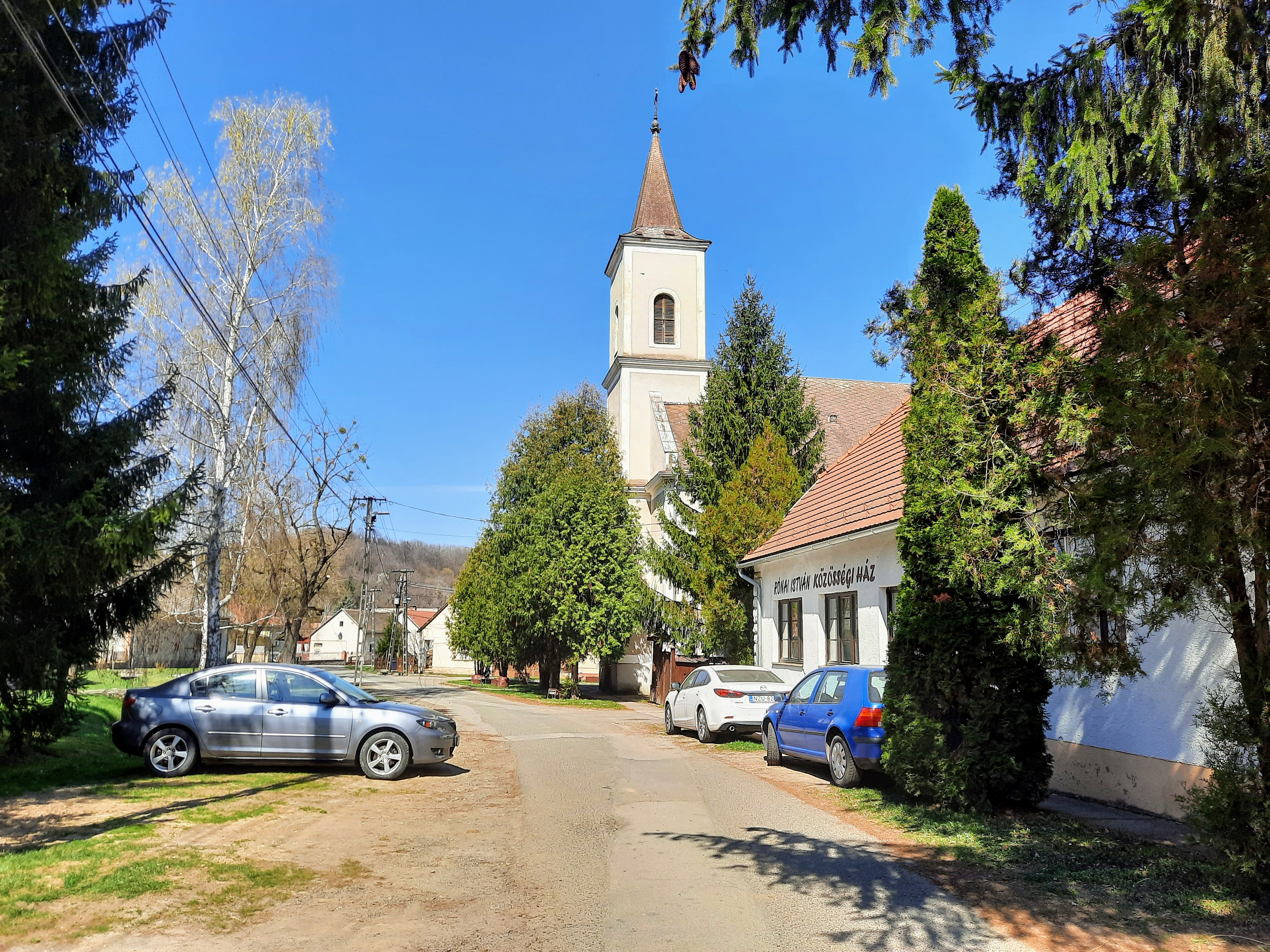
- Interactive map of Kárász
- Coordinates: 46°16′02″N 18°19′05″E
- Country: Hungary
- County: Baranya

Area
  - Total: 8.02 km^{2} (3.10 sq mi)
- Elevation: 220 m (720 ft)

Population
  - Total: 289
- Time zone: UTC+1 (CET)
  - Summer (DST): UTC+2 (CEST)
- Area code: 72

Kárász (Hungarian pronunciation: [ˈkaːraːs]) is a village in Baranya county, Hungary. Its population was 289 people, as of 2021, split into 151 homes. The geographic size is 802 hectares.

== History ==
The village was established prior to 1325 and is mentioned in reference to the village of Bóda. It is therefore speculated that the village was first created under the Árpád era. Another nearby community was established in 1778 by German artisans. The village expanded when the Dombóvár-Bátaszék railway line was built in the 1870s.
