= Márok =

- Village
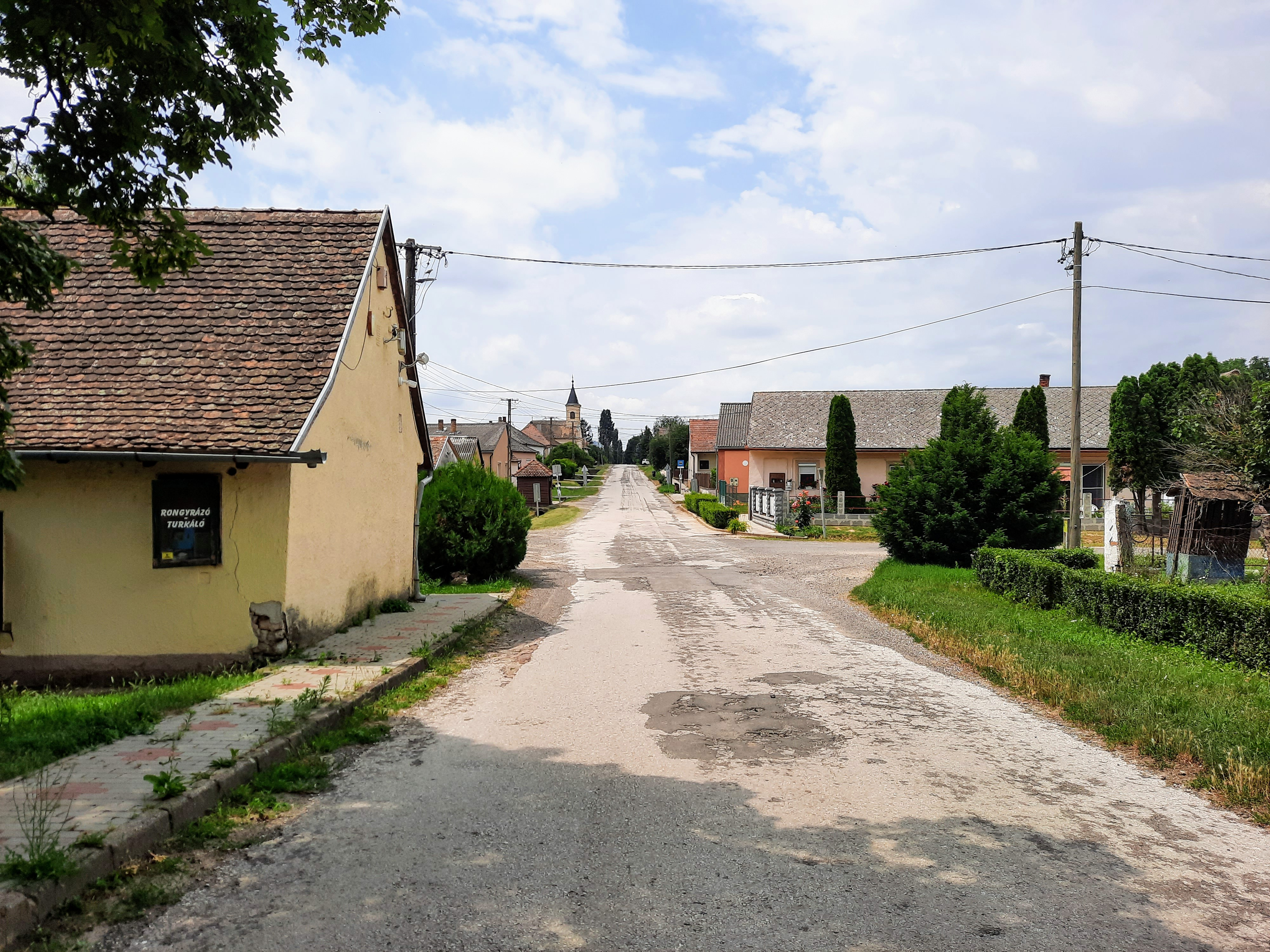
- Interactive map of Márok
- Coordinates: 45°52′N 18°31′E
- Country: Hungary
- County: Baranya
- Time zone: UTC+1 (CET)
  - Summer (DST): UTC+2 (CEST)

Márok is a village in Baranya county, Hungary. Until the end of World War II, the inhabitants were Danube Swabians. Most of the former German settlers were expelled to Germany and Austria around 1945–1948. More about the Potsdam Agreement.
