= Tófű =

- Village (Falva)
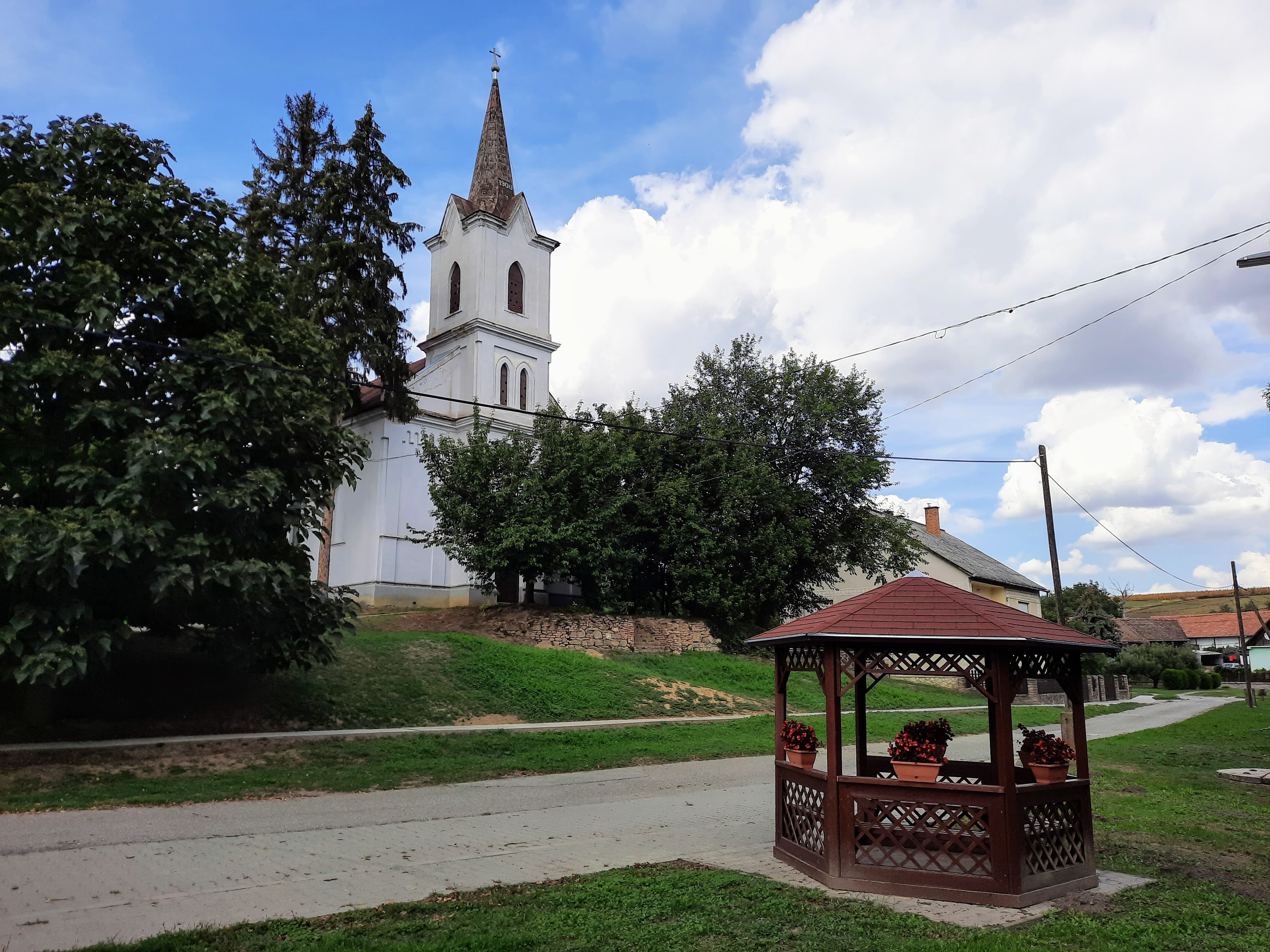

- Seal

- Location of Tófű
- Coordinates: 46°19′N 18°22′E
- Country: Hungary
- County: Baranya
- District: Komló

Government
  - Type: Village
  - Mayor: Zsolt Walke

Area
  - Total: 1.68 sq mi (4.34 km^{2})

Population (2015)
  - Total: 116
  - Density: 69.2/sq mi (26.7/km^{2})
- Time zone: UTC+1 (CET)
  - Summer (DST): UTC+2 (CEST)
- Postal Code: 7348
- Area code: 72
- KSH code: 04048

Tófű (German: Tofi) is a village in Baranya County, Hungary, northeast of Pécs in the Komló District. As of 2015, its population was 166.

== History ==
The name Tófű was first mentioned in 1382 in the form of Thofew. The village was probably named for the nearby lake.

After the expulsion of the Turks, the area was settled by Serbs, and later by Germans in the early 18th century. Following the Second World War, the German inhabitants were evacuated and replaced by Hungarians from Upper Hungary in the Czechoslovak–Hungarian population exchange.
