= Kisnyárád =

Kisnyárád Kischnaarad
- Village
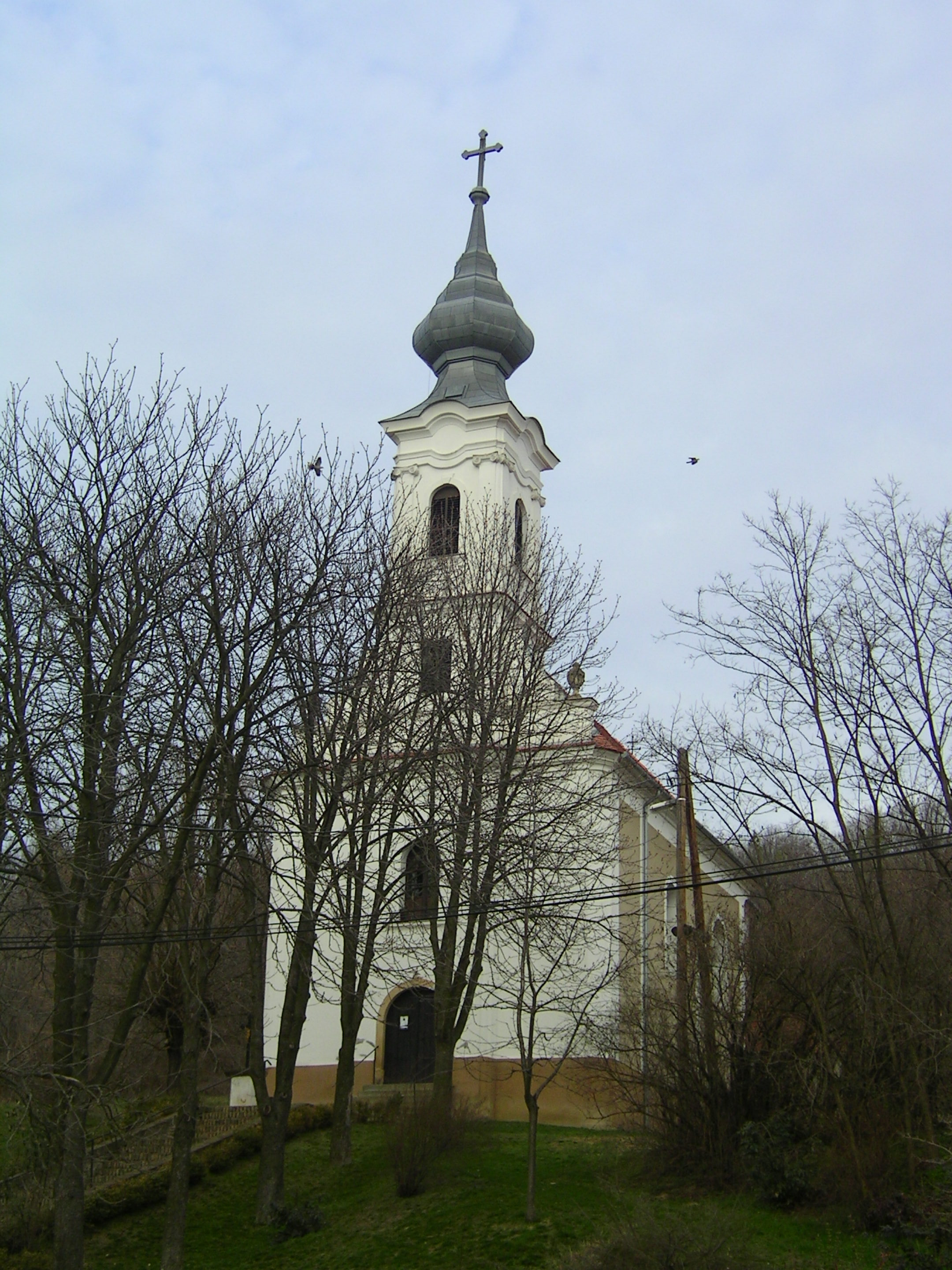
- Árpád-házi Szent Erzsébet (Saint Elizabeth) Roman Catholic Church in Kisnyárád, 2010
- Interactive map of Kisnyárád
- Coordinates: 46°02′N 18°34′E
- Country: Hungary
- County: Baranya

Population (2025)
  - Total: 154
- Time zone: UTC+1 (CET)
  - Summer (DST): UTC+2 (CEST)

Kisnyárád (German: Kischnaarad) is a village in Baranya County, Hungary.
