= Erdősmárok =

- Village
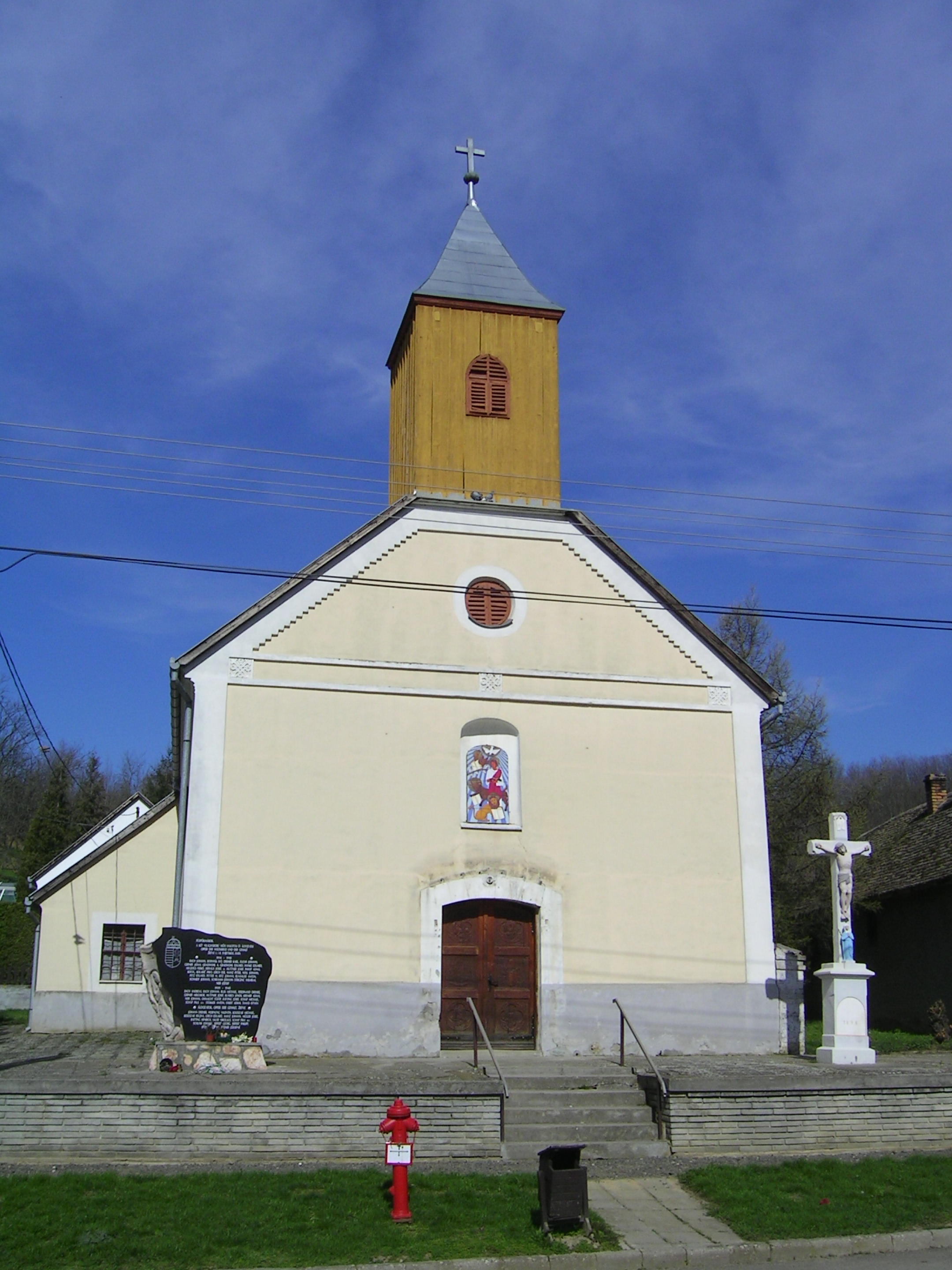
- In front of Saint Luke Catholic church
- Interactive map of Erdősmárok
- Coordinates: 46°03′22″N 18°32′43″E
- Country: Hungary
- County: Baranya
- Time zone: UTC+1 (CET)
  - Summer (DST): UTC+2 (CEST)

Erdősmárok is a village in Baranya county, in southern Hungary.
