= Bezedek =

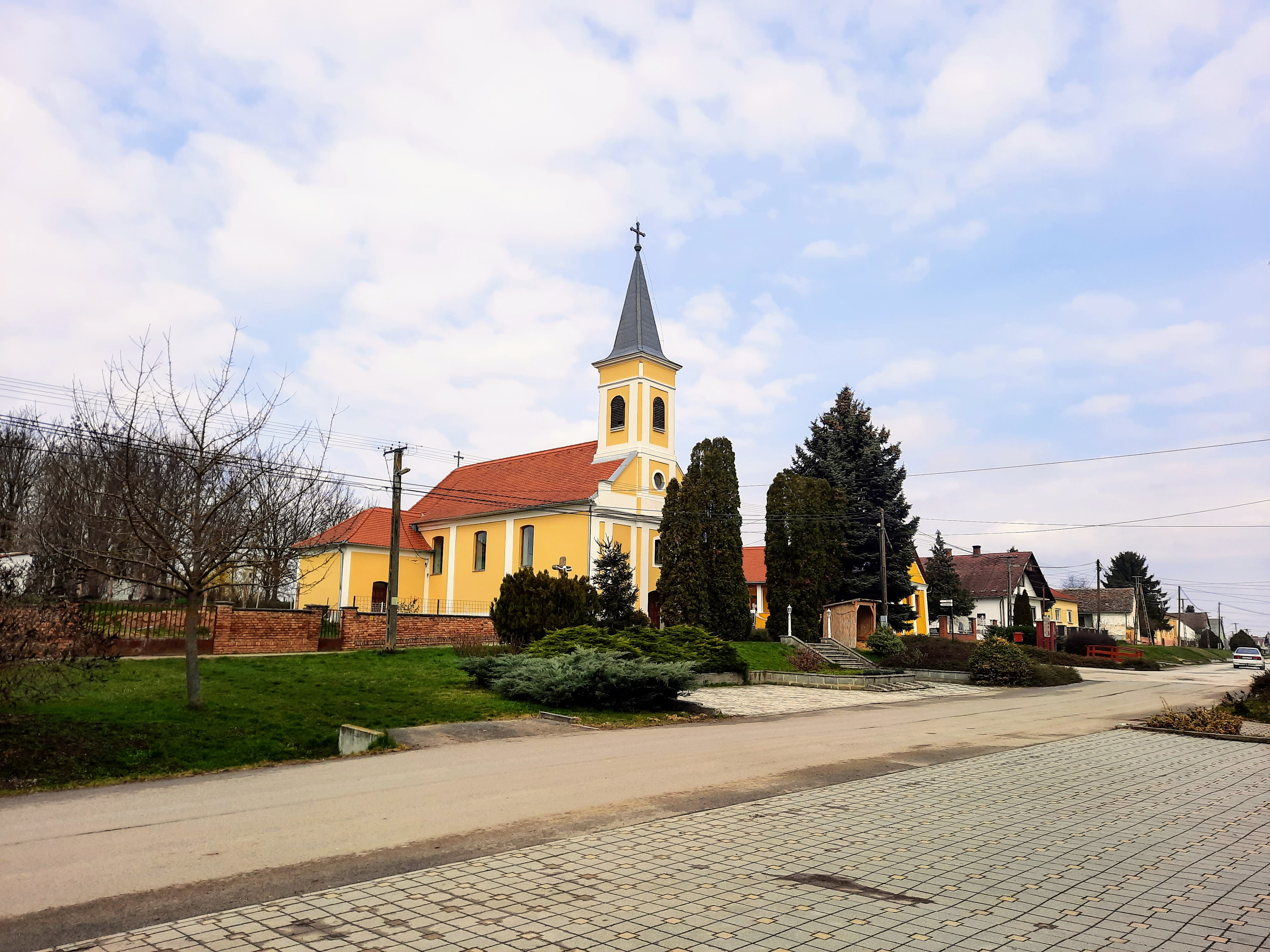

- Flag Coat of arms

- Location of Baranya county in Hungary

- Location of Bezedek
- Coordinates: 45.86552°N 18.58610°E
- Country: Hungary
- County: Baranya

Area
  - Total: 11.36 km^{2} (4.39 sq mi)

Population (2015)
  - Total: 223
  - Density: 19.6/km^{2} (50.8/sq mi)
- Time zone: UTC+1 (CET)
  - Summer (DST): UTC+2 (CEST)
- Postal code: 7782
- Area code: 69

Bezedek is a village in Baranya county, Hungary. Until the end of World War II, the inhabitants were Danube Swabians. Most of the former German settlers were expelled to Germany and Austria in 1945–1948, following the Potsdam Agreement. Only a few Germans of Hungary live there, the majority today are the descendants of Hungarians from the Czechoslovak–Hungarian population exchange. They got the houses of the former Danube Swabian Inhabitants.
