= Bár =

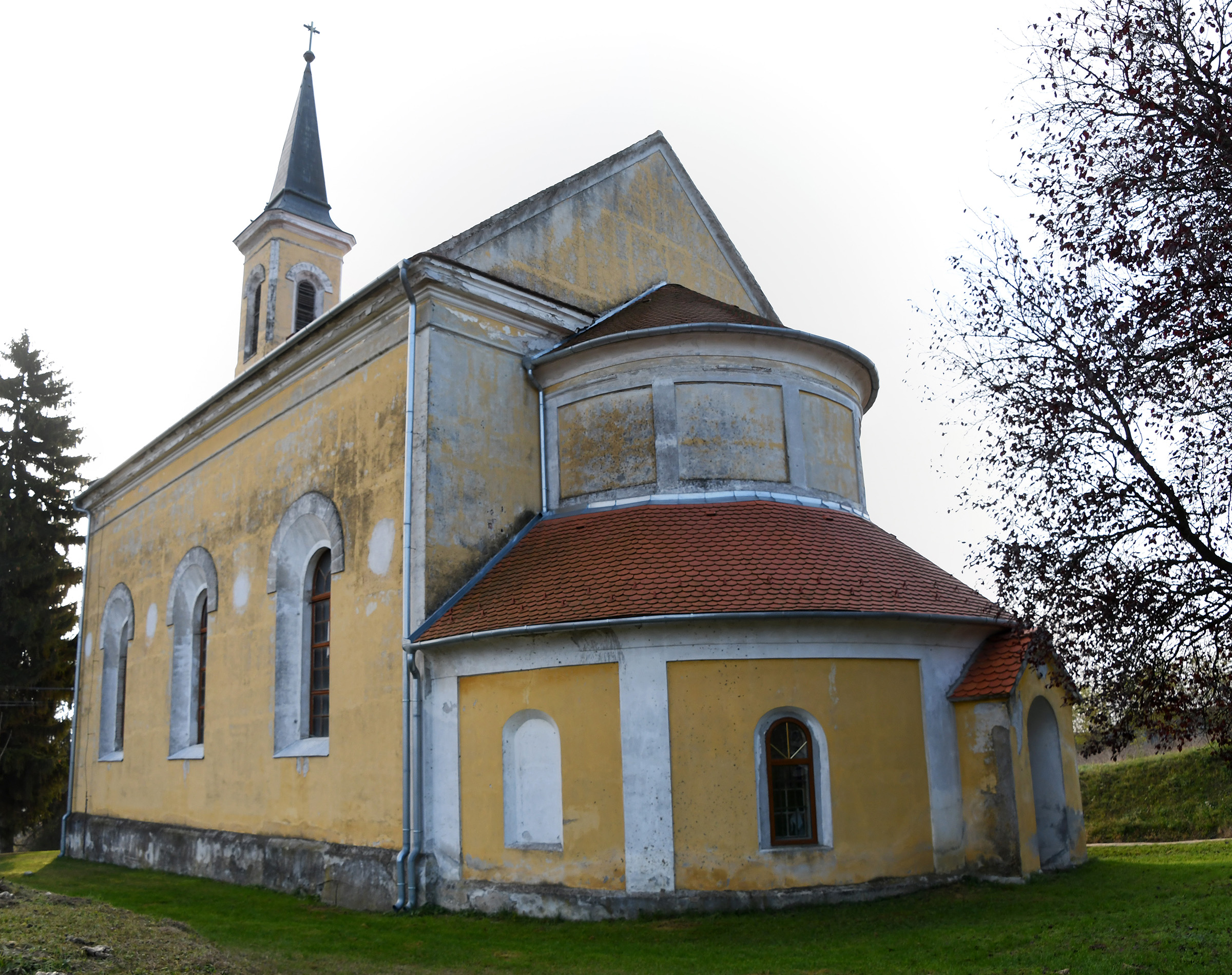

- Coat of arms

- Location of Baranya county in Hungary

- Location of Bár
- Coordinates: 46.05082°N 18.71562°E
- Country: Hungary
- County: Baranya

Area
  - Total: 9 km^{2} (3.5 sq mi)

Population (2015)
  - Total: 522
  - Density: 58/km^{2} (150/sq mi)
- Time zone: UTC+01:00 (CET)
  - Summer (DST): UTC+02:00 (CEST)
- Postal code: 7711
- Area code: 69

Bár (German: Baar, Croatian: Bar) is a village in Baranya County, Hungary.
