= Liget =

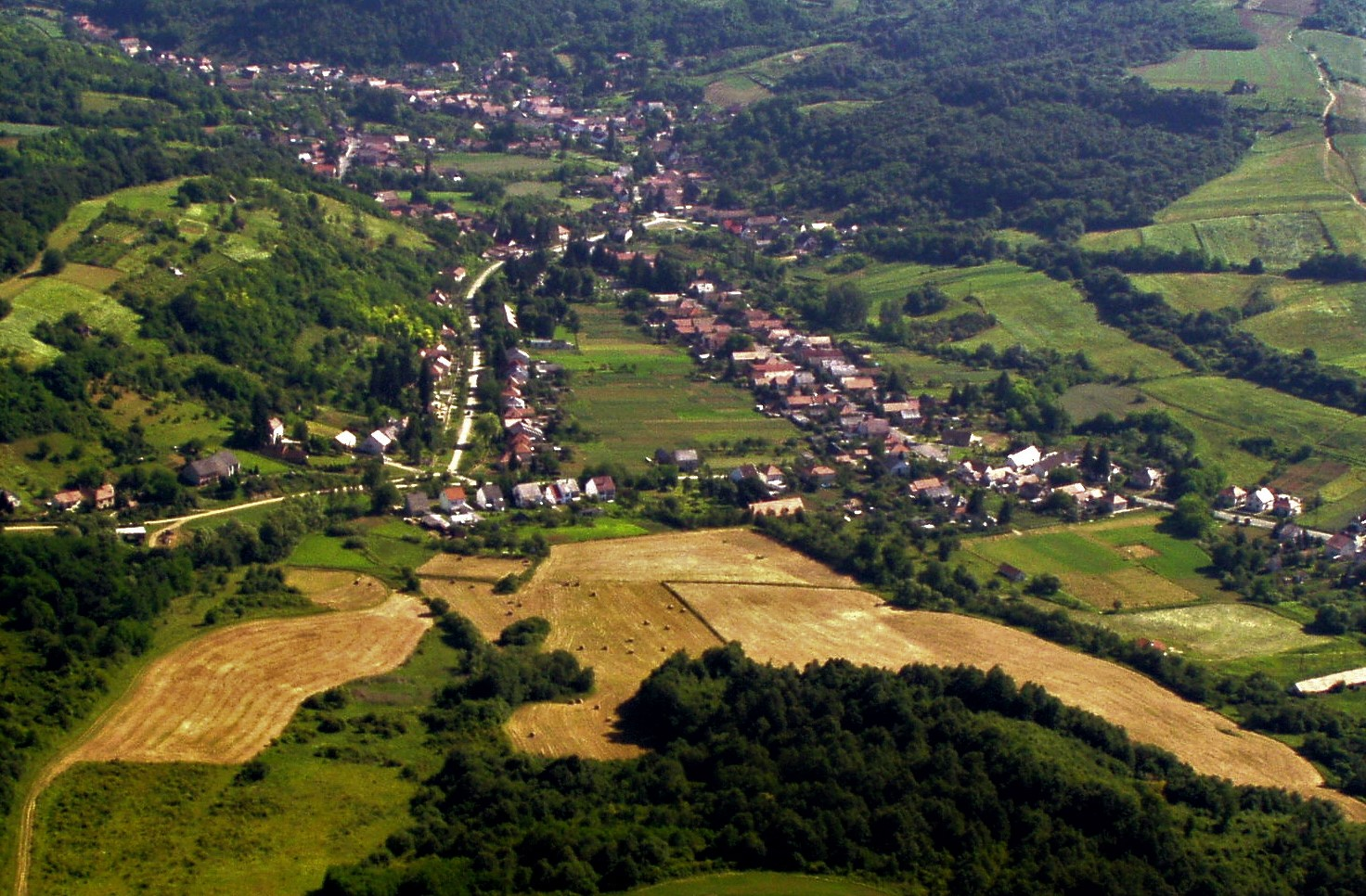

- Location of Baranya county in Hungary

- Location of Liget
- Coordinates: 46.23440°N 18.19208°E
- Country: Hungary
- County: Baranya

Area
  - Total: 12.07 km^{2} (4.66 sq mi)

Population (2025)
  - Total: 356
  - Density: 37.53/km^{2} (97.2/sq mi)
- Time zone: UTC+1 (CET)
  - Summer (DST): UTC+2 (CEST)
- Postal code: 7331
- Area code: 72

Liget is a village in Baranya county, Hungary. Liget had a population of 356 as of 2025. Liget coordinates: latitude is 46.2359700, and its longitude 18.1921000.
