= Szárász =

- Village (Falva)
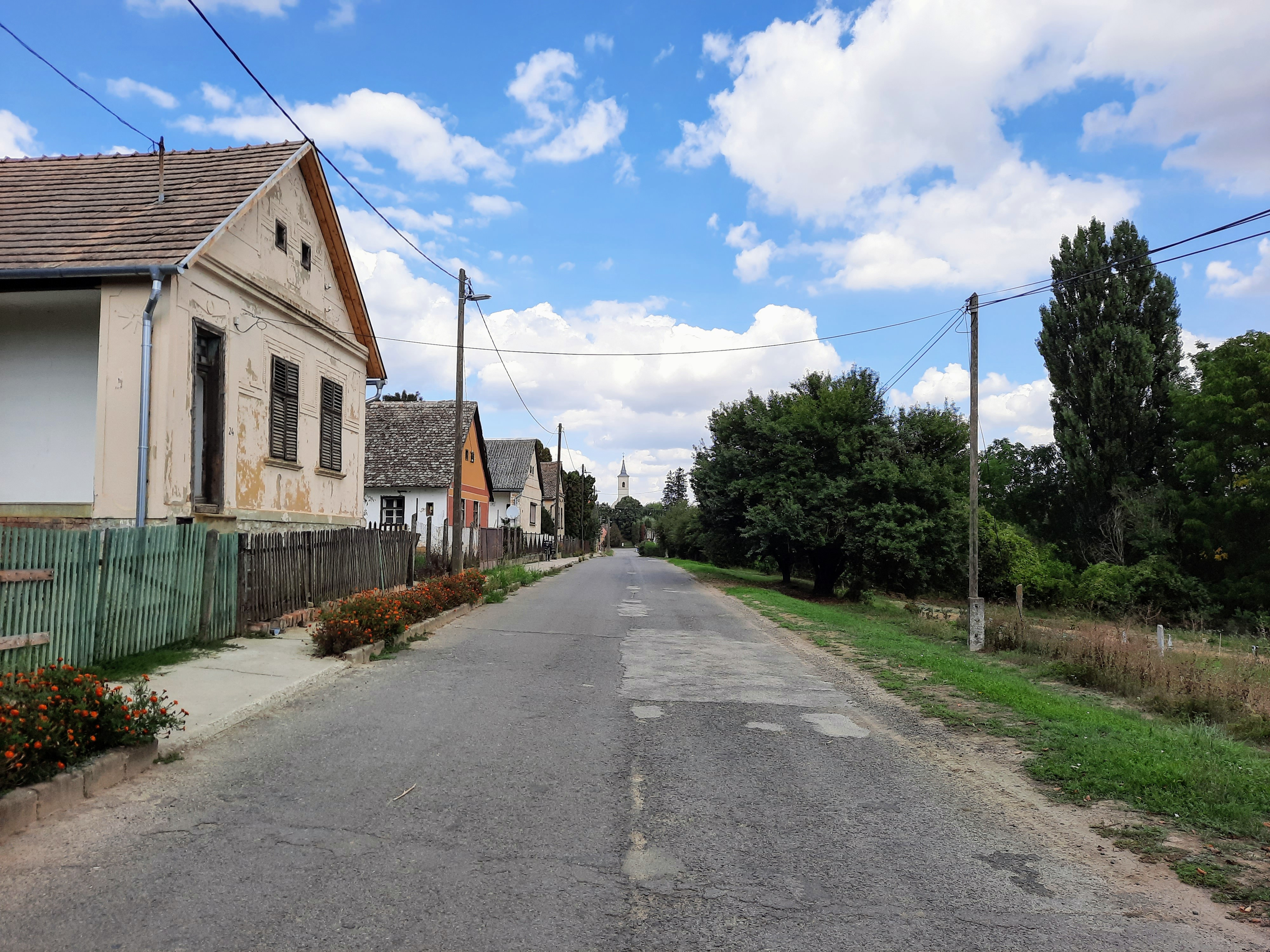
- Interactive map of Szárász
- Coordinates: 46°21′N 18°23′E
- Country: Hungary
- County: Baranya

Population (2025)
  - Total: 34
- Time zone: UTC+1 (CET)
  - Summer (DST): UTC+2 (CEST)

Szárász is a village in Baranya county, Hungary.
