= Szalatnak =

Szalatnak Salack
- Village (Falva)
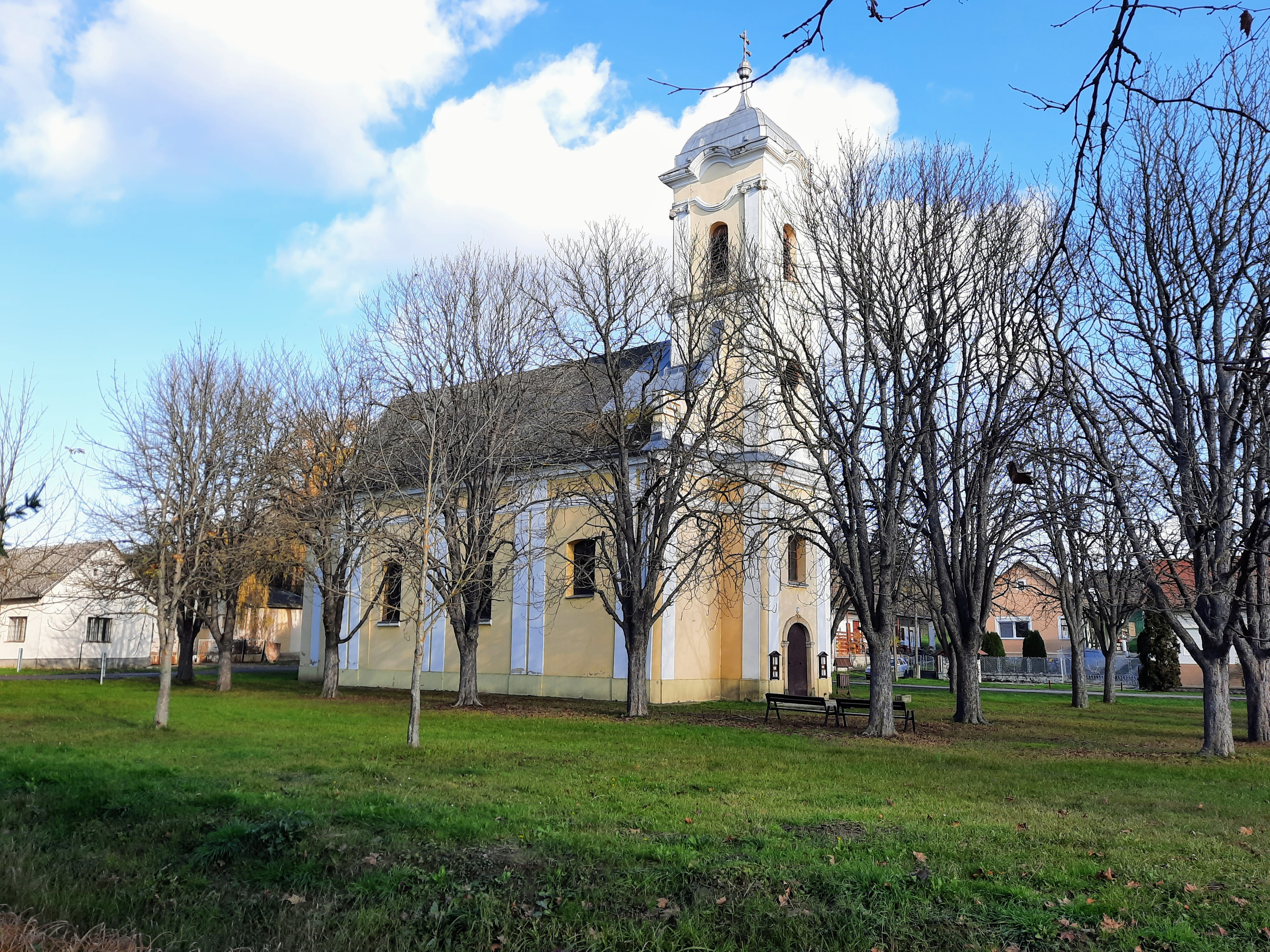

- Flag Seal

- Location of Baranya county in Hungary

- Location of Szalatnak
- Coordinates: 46.29032°N 18.28139°E
- Country: Hungary
- County: Baranya

Area
  - Total: 10.29 km^{2} (3.97 sq mi)

Population (2004)
  - Total: 405
  - Density: 39.35/km^{2} (101.9/sq mi)
- Time zone: UTC+1 (CET)
  - Summer (DST): UTC+2 (CEST)
- Postal code: 7334
- Area code: 72

Szalatnak (German: Salack; Croatian: Slatnik) is a village in Baranya County, Hungary.
