= Magyarhertelend =

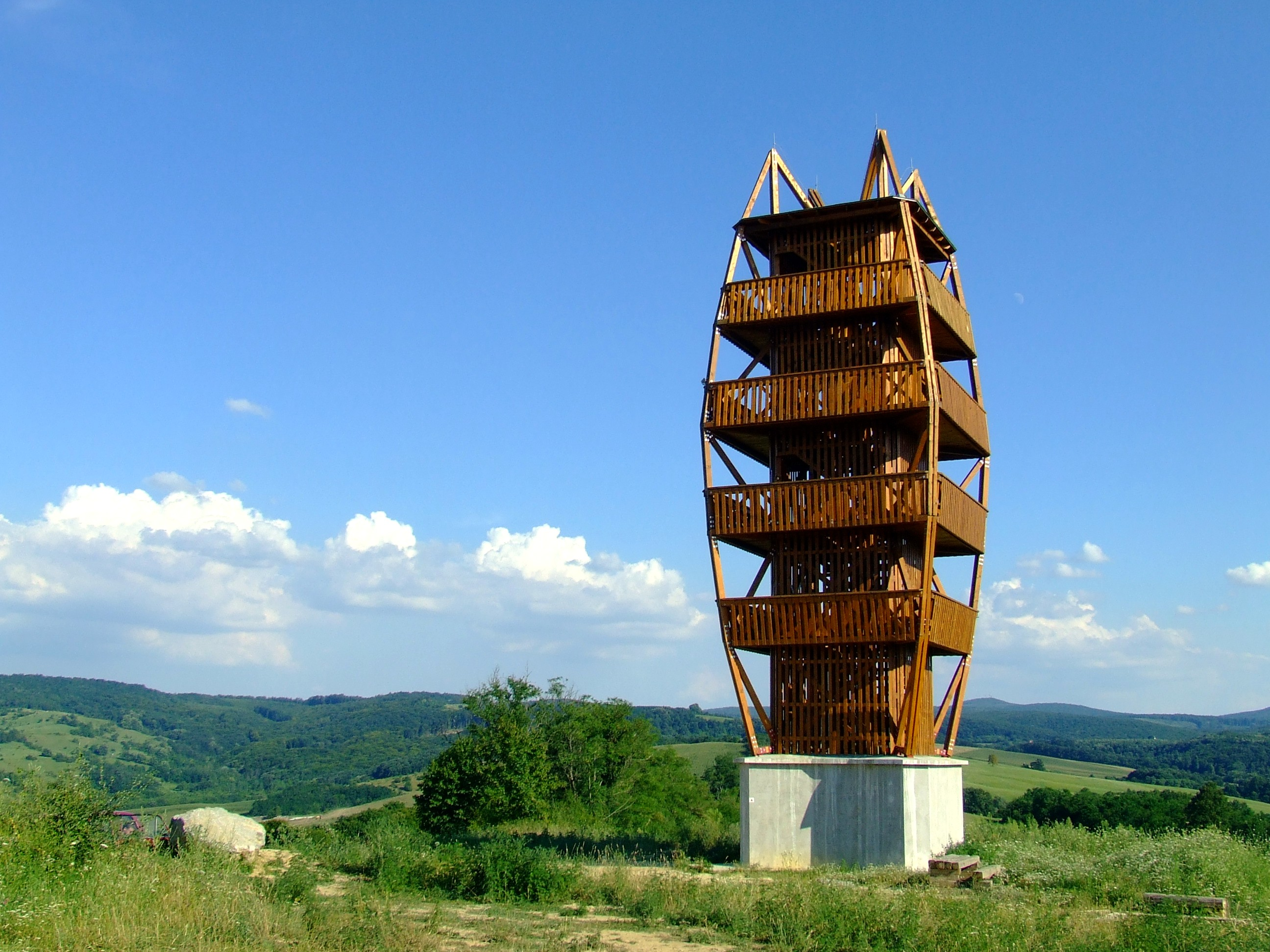

- Location of Baranya county in Hungary

- Location of Magyarhertelend
- Coordinates: 46.18575°N 18.15078°E
- Country: Hungary
- County: Baranya

Area
  - Total: 16.16 km^{2} (6.24 sq mi)

Population (2004)
  - Total: 670
  - Density: 41.46/km^{2} (107.4/sq mi)
- Time zone: UTC+1 (CET)
  - Summer (DST): UTC+2 (CEST)
- Postal code: 7394
- Area code: 72

Magyarhertelend is a village in Baranya county, Hungary.
