= Nagynyárád =

Nagynyárád Großnaarad
- Village
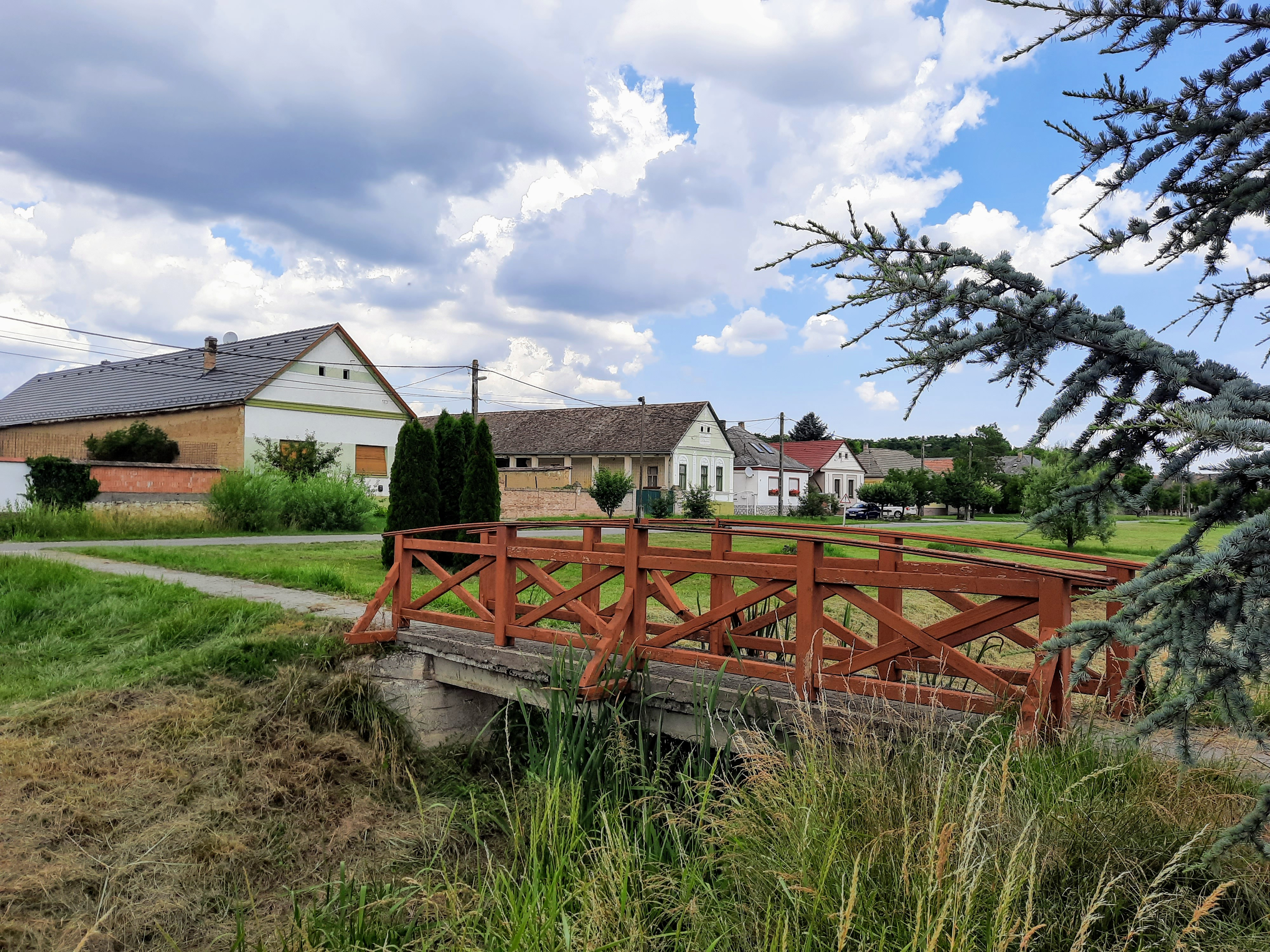
- Interactive map of Nagynyárád
- Coordinates: 45°57′N 18°35′E
- Country: Hungary
- County: Baranya

Population (2025)
  - Total: 607
- Time zone: UTC+1 (CET)
  - Summer (DST): UTC+2 (CEST)

Nagynyárád (German: Großnaarad) is a village in Baranya County, Hungary.
