= Sárok =

- Village (Falva)
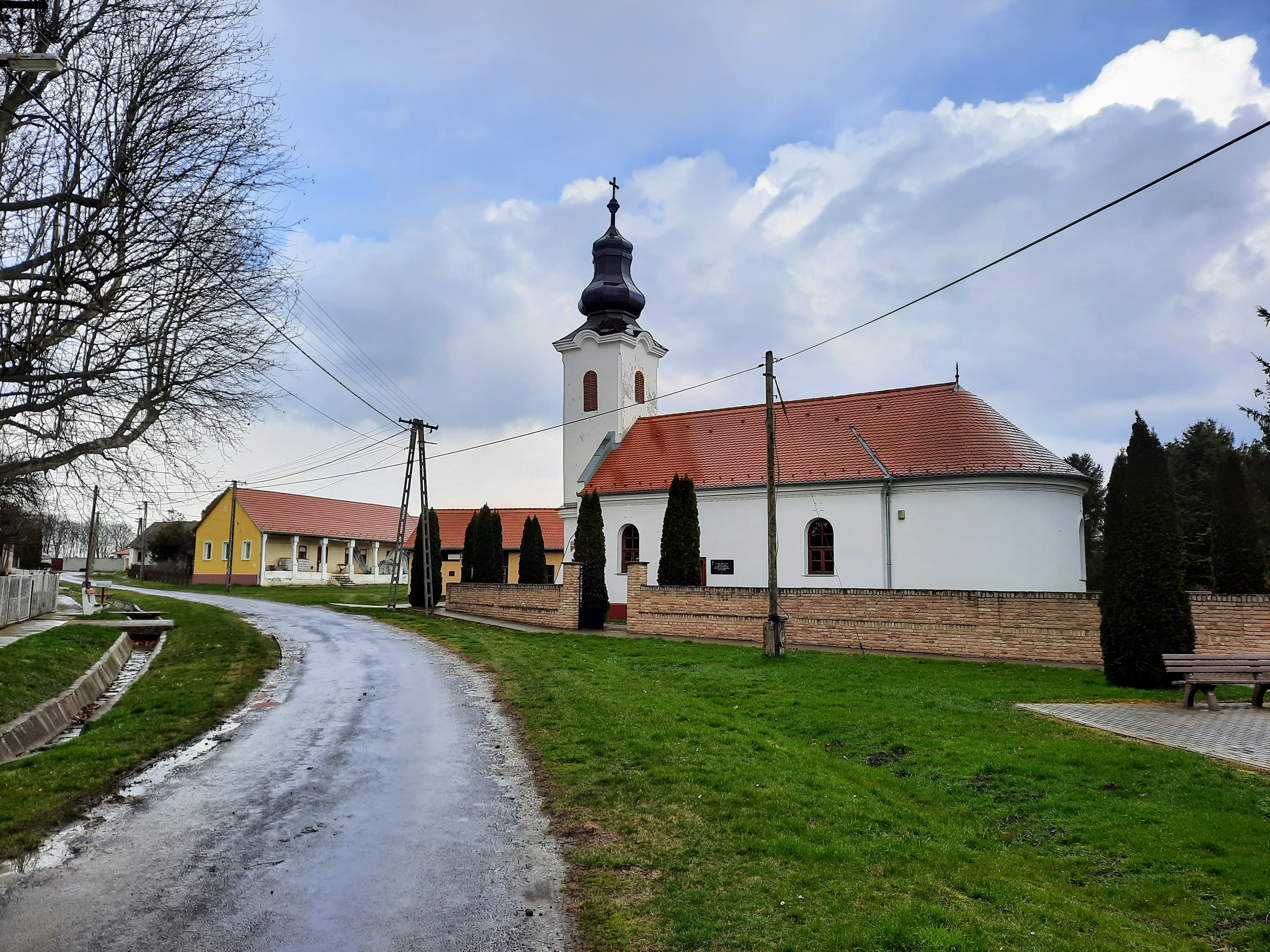
- Serbian Orthodox Church in Sárok
- Interactive map of Sárok
- Coordinates: 45°50′N 18°37′E
- Country: Hungary
- County: Baranya

Population (2025)
  - Total: 91
- Time zone: UTC+1 (CET)
  - Summer (DST): UTC+2 (CEST)

Sárok (Serbian: Шарок, romanized: Šarok) is a village in Baranya county, Hungary. Residents are Magyars, with minority of Serbs.
