= Hegyhátmaróc =

- Village
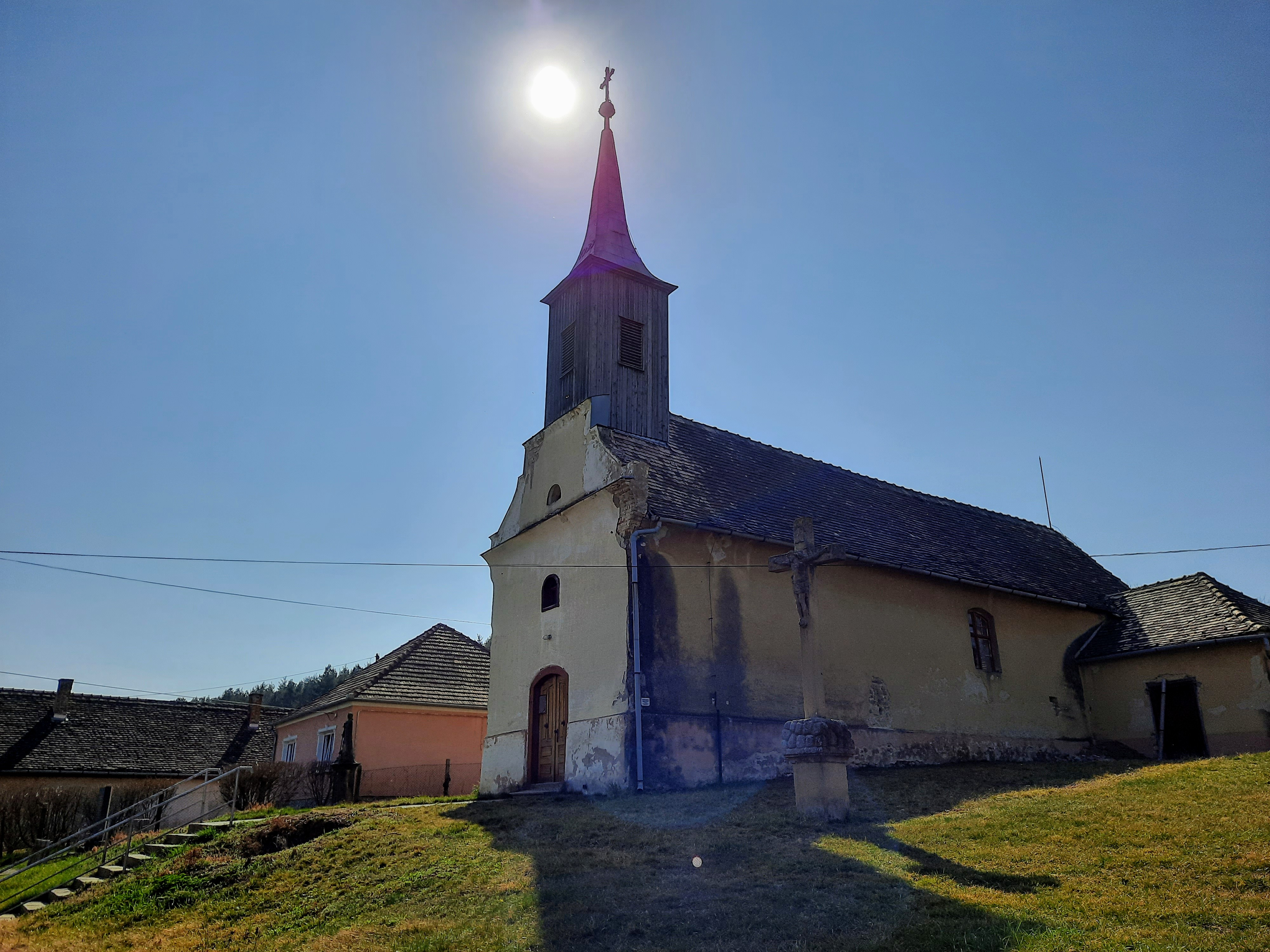
- Interactive map of Hegyhátmaróc
- Coordinates: 46°19′N 18°20′E
- Country: Hungary
- County: Baranya
- Time zone: UTC+1 (CET)
  - Summer (DST): UTC+2 (CEST)

Hegyhátmaróc is a village in Baranya county, Hungary.
