= Bikal =

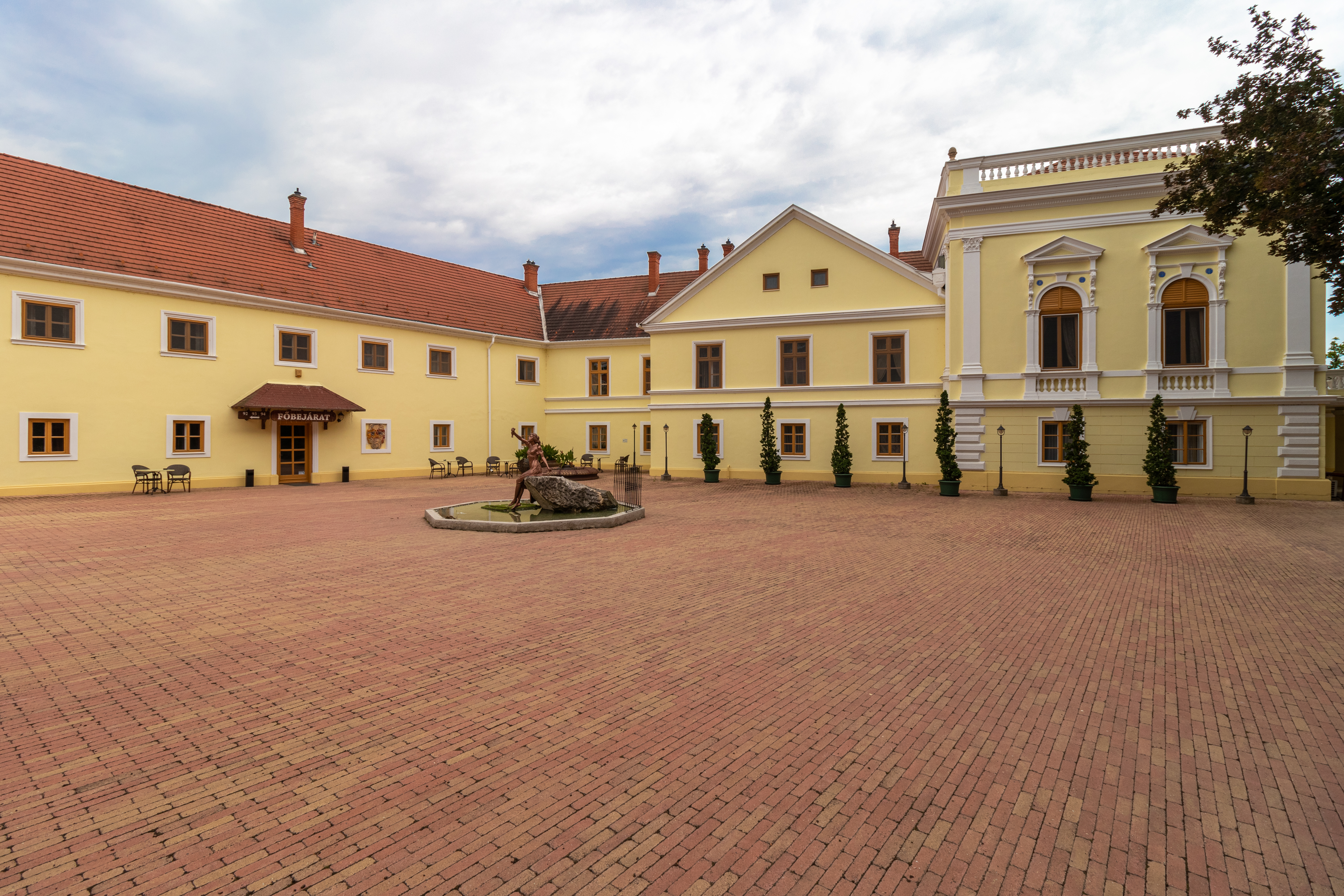

- Coat of arms

- Location of Baranya county in Hungary

- Location of Bikal
- Coordinates: 46.33188°N 18.28575°E
- Country: Hungary
- County: Baranya

Area
  - Total: 17.03 km^{2} (6.58 sq mi)

Population (2004)
  - Total: 854
  - Density: 50.14/km^{2} (129.9/sq mi)
- Time zone: UTC+1 (CET)
  - Summer (DST): UTC+2 (CEST)
- Postal code: 7346
- Area code: 72

Bikal (German: Wickerl, Croatian: Bikala) is a village in Baranya county, Hungary.
