= Magyarszék =

- Village
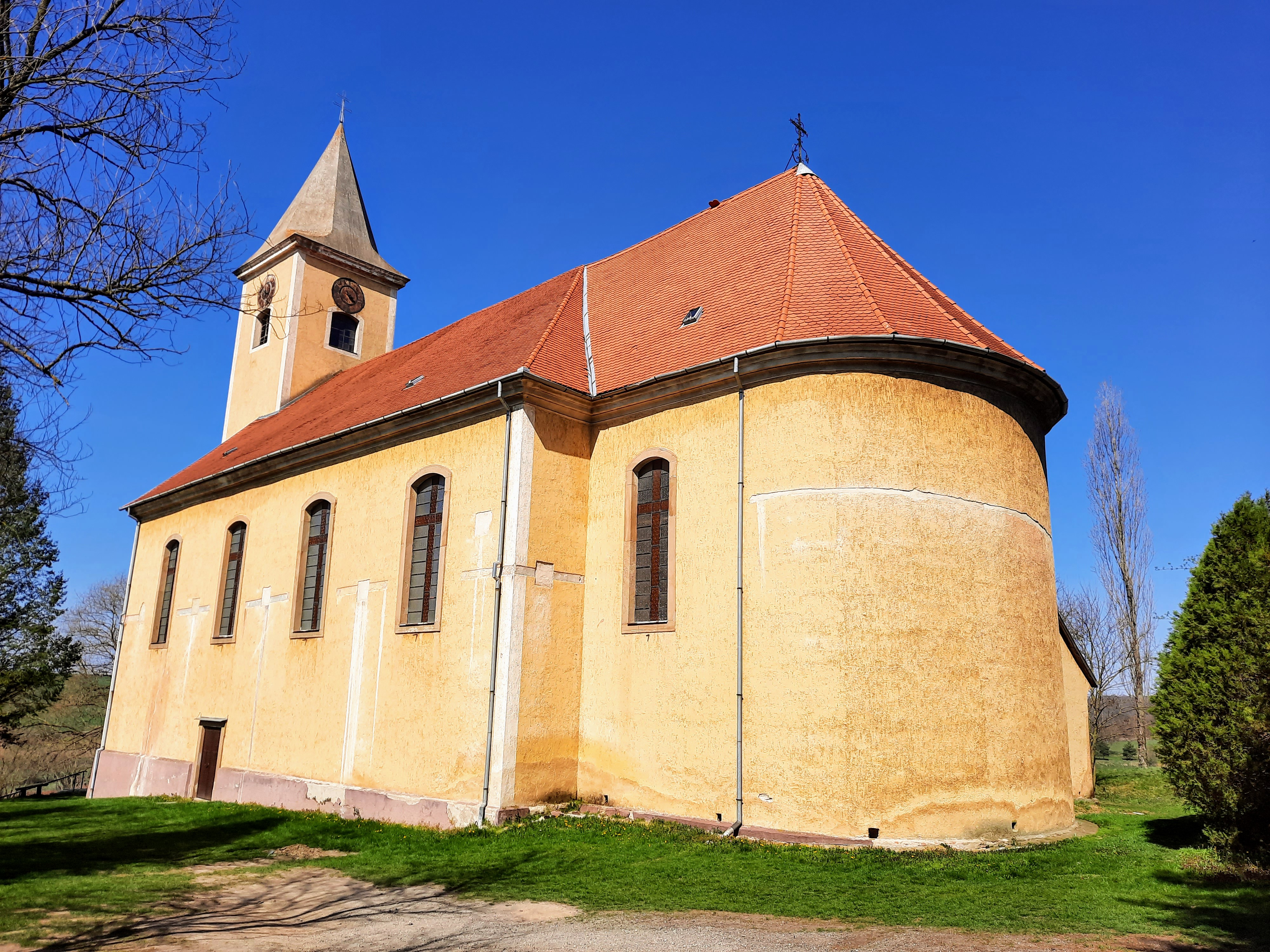
- Interactive map of Magyarszék
- Coordinates: 46°12′N 18°12′E
- Country: Hungary
- County: Baranya

Population (2025)
  - Total: 946
- Time zone: UTC+1 (CET)
  - Summer (DST): UTC+2 (CEST)

Magyarszék is a village in Baranya county, Hungary.
