= Szászvár =

- Large village
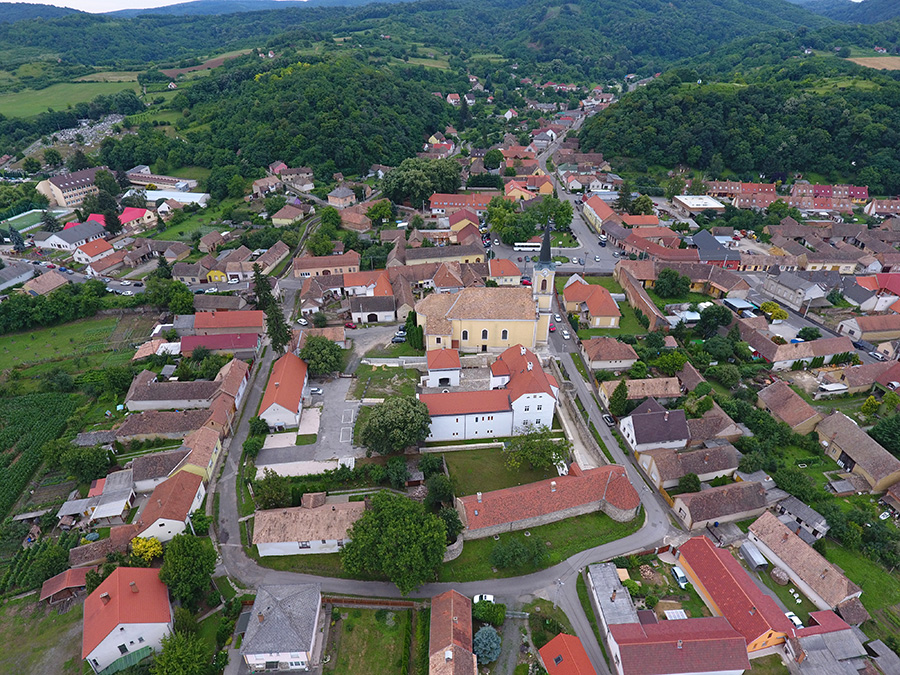

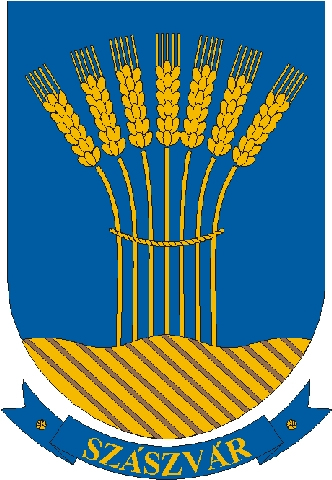
- Coat of arms

- Location of Szászvár in Hungary
- Coordinates: 46°16′N 18°22′E
- Country: Hungary
- Region: Southern Transdanubia
- County: Baranya
- Time zone: UTC+1 (CET)
  - Summer (DST): UTC+2 (CEST)
- Area code: +36
- Website: http://szaszvar.hu/

Szászvár is a large village in Baranya county, Hungary.
