= Egyházaskozár =

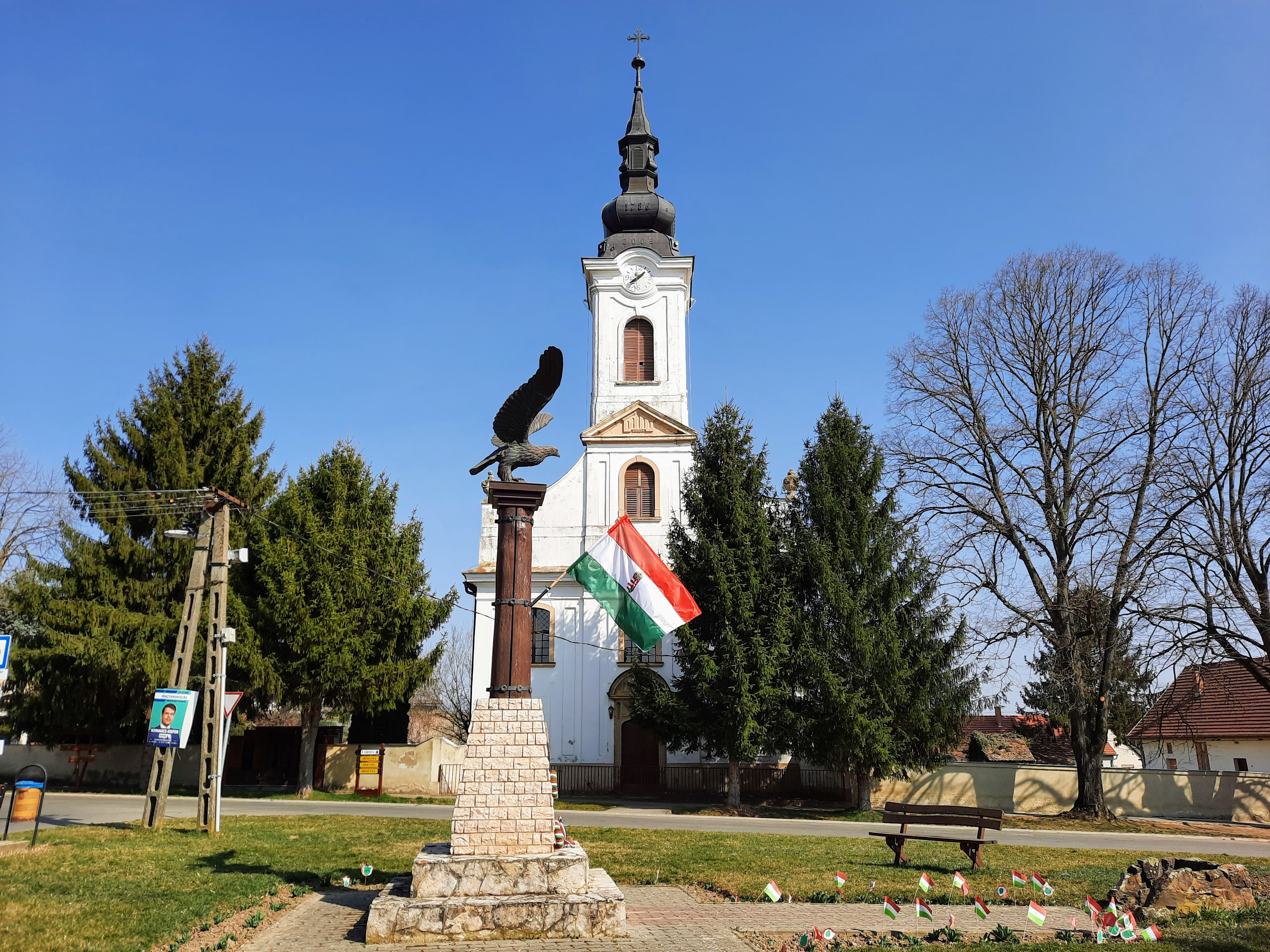

- Coat of arms

- Location of Baranya county in Hungary

- Location of Egyházaskozár
- Coordinates: 46.33035°N 18.31749°E
- Country: Hungary
- County: Baranya

Area
  - Total: 24.31 km^{2} (9.39 sq mi)

Population (2015)
  - Total: 769
  - Density: 31.6/km^{2} (81.9/sq mi)
- Time zone: UTC+1 (CET)
  - Summer (DST): UTC+2 (CEST)
- Postal code: 7347
- Area code: 72

Egyhazaskozar is a village in Baranya County, Hungary, close to the Mecsek Mountains.
