= Székelyszabar =

- Village (Falva)
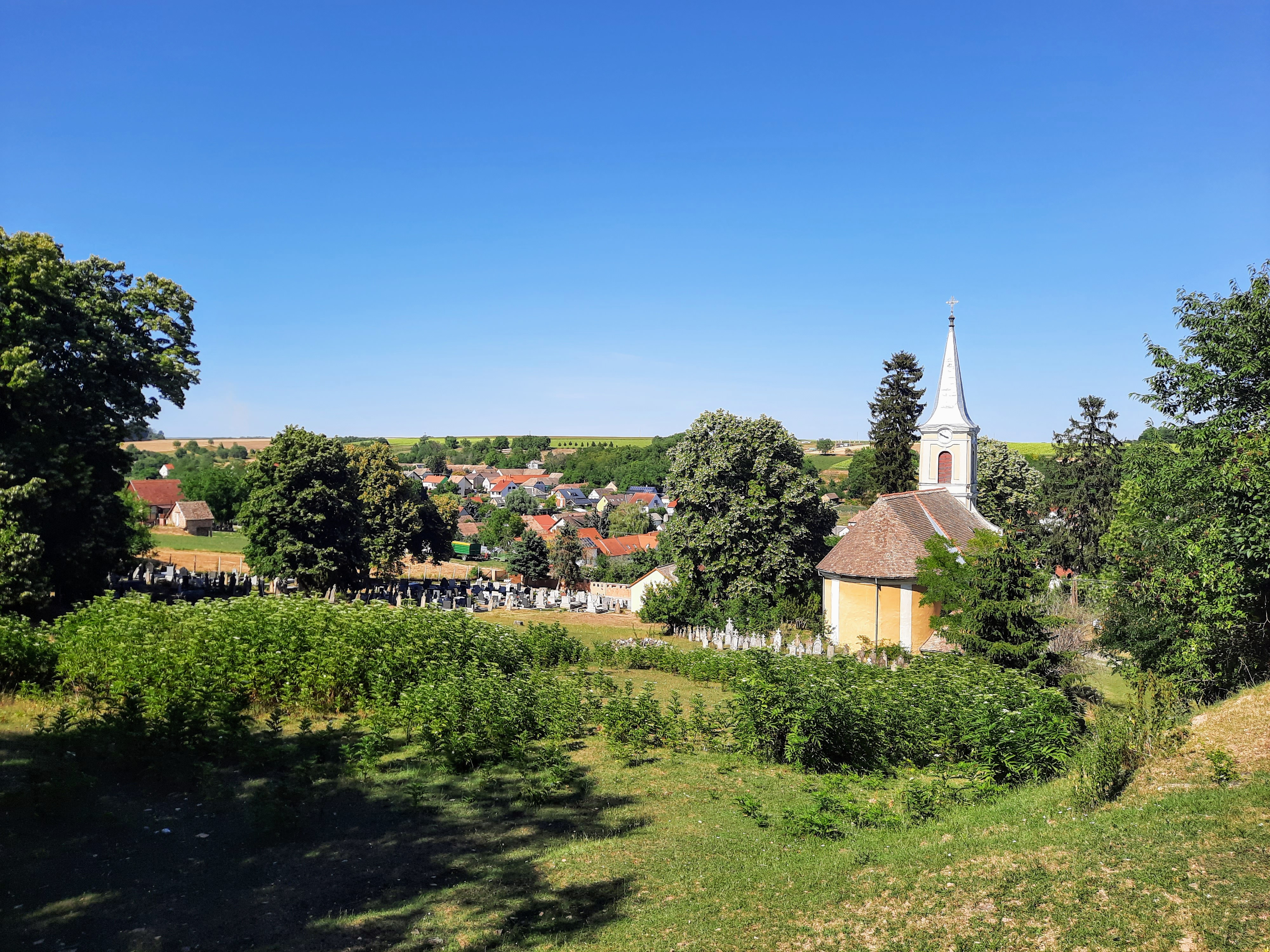

- Location of Baranya county in Hungary

- Location of Székelyszabar
- Coordinates: 46.04659°N 18.60361°E
- Country: Hungary
- County: Baranya

Area
  - Total: 15.48 km^{2} (5.98 sq mi)

Population (2025)
  - Total: 515
- Time zone: UTC+1 (CET)
  - Summer (DST): UTC+2 (CEST)
- Postal code: 7737
- Area code: 69

Székelyszabar is a village in Baranya county, Hungary.
