= Bodó de Györgyi =

Hungarian noble family (14th century to the 16th century)

House of Bodó
- Parent house: Genus Szentemágócs
- Country: Kingdom of Hungary
- Founded: c. 1338
- Founder: Bodó
- Final ruler: Farkas
- Estates: Györgyi, Anyavár etc.
- Dissolution: c. 1564
- Cadet branches: Bodó de Dada (1523†)

The Bodó de Györgyi (Hungarian: györgyi Bodó) was a medieval noble family in the Kingdom of Hungary from the mid-14th century to the 1560s, which possessed estates primarily in Tolna, Somogy and Baranya counties. They were initially belonged to the lower nobility, but they rose socially and, for a brief period, gained entry into the elite during the governorship of John Hunyadi and the early reign of his son, Matthias Corvinus.

After the Battle of Mohács in 1526, they gradually lost their estates due to the Ottoman advance. In the final decades of their existence, they were also known by the name Bodó de Mesztegnyő (Hungarian: mesztegnyői Bodó), after they relocated their center further north due to the Ottoman threat. A group of nobles from the mid-15th century, called as the Bodó de Dada (Hungarian: dadai Bodó) family is a sub-branch of the Bodó de Györgyi kinship.

== History ==
=== Origin ===
Based on their coat-of-arms (three roses held by an armored right arm), the Bodó de Györgyi family originated from the Tolna branch of the gens (clan) Szentemágócs. The earliest known member of the family was Mark (I), who lived in the middle of the 13th century. His two sons were cleric Stephen, who served as cantor of the cathedral chapter of Pécs between 1287 and 1296, and Mark (II). In 1291, they were among the members of the Szentemágócs clan from its various branches, who approved to certain members of the clan's Szabolcs–Zemplén branch to regain the patronage over the Cistercian St. Mary monastery in Esztergom in or out of court. Mark (II) testified in 1292 concerning the losses suffered by the cathedral chapter of Esztergom caused by the sons of Casimir Hont-Pázmány. Mark (II) of Anya and other nobles from Tolna County acted as arbiters in a division contract among the Szakadáti family in 1305. The document implies that Mark held his residence in the estate Anya along the river Sárvíz (near present-day Sióagárd) in Tolna County.

Mark's son, Bodó was the eponymous ancestor of the family. He is mentioned as a royal bailiff during a lawsuit between Szekszárd Abbey and the Becsei family concerning the estate Földvár in 1338. He represented the abbey's interests. Bodó also lived in Anya. His son was Nicholas (I), whose sons Michael and James acquired a land called Kajmát near Anya on the occasion of an exchange in 1399. They were called Bodó de Györgyi for the first time. The village Györgyi once had laid near Mágocs (the ancient seat of the Szentemágócs kindred) in Tolna County. The lordships of Györgyi and Anya became the two centers of the Bodós' domains on the border of Tolna and Baranya counties. Until the first half of the 15th century, the Bodó de Györgyi family belonged to the minor nobility without political power and social embeddedness.

=== Rise and peak ===
Seal of Gregory Bodó, 1445

The rise of the family is linked to the sons of James. The eldest one, Gregory entered court service during the reign of Sigismund. He acted as royal bailiff in 1424. He rose to prominence as a leading familiaris of Nicholas Újlaki, who was a prominent partisan of Władysław III of Poland during the 1440s' civil war. Gregory, his brothers Andrew and Nicholas (II), together with their cousin John (I), took part in the siege of Máré Castle in 1441, which was a property of their local rivals, the Töttös family (supporters of Ladislaus V). Probably financed by Gregory, Nicholas entered ecclesiastical career and attended the University of Vienna. Compared to most Hungarian noble families, university attendance appears with notably high frequency among the Bodós. Nicholas served as provost of Bács (present-day Bač, Serbia) in the Archdiocese of Kalocsa at least from 1443. He was made coadjutor bishop in the Diocese of Veszprém in 1443 too. His appointment to Veszprém came about as a result of Újlaki's influence. Nicholas was responsible for the diocese's secular affairs and half of the episcopal income also belonged to him and his brother Gregory. As coadjutor bishop or secular governor, Nicholas took control over the episcopal castles of Sümeg and Veszprém. Under Újlaki, Gregory served as Vice-voivode of Transylvania between 1444 and 1446, then he functioned as vice-ispán of Tolna County from 1446 to 1447, administering the county on behalf of Újlaki. Meanwhile, Nicholas was appointed Provost of Székesfehérvár in early November 1444. Taking advantage of the chaotic situation, Gregory and his brother Dominic seized the estate Dada (near Igal) in Somogy County from Margaret Dadai sometime prior to 1446. In that year, in accordance with the resolution of the diet at Székesfehérvár, Margaret's husband, Nicholas Baki called upon the brothers to return the estate.

Compared to Gregory and Nicholas, their brother Andrew had a less significant career; he possessed a portion in Döbrököz. He appears a neighboring lord near the estate Németi (today a borough of Szalánta) in Baranya County in 1445. He acted as an envoy of Tolna County in the Diet of 1447. Gregory and Andrew were involved in a series of lawsuits against the Töttös family, who possessed the castle of Máré, in 1447–1448, concerning the estates Vaszar and Bágyon, and various mutual violations of the law. He possessed a portion in Dada, according to a charter from 1448, when he was in dispute over the estate with the Dominican nuns of Rabbits' Island. Their cousin John, son of Michael, married Agatha Helesfalvi, a scion of a noble family from Baranya County. She was the widow of John Gyulai. He possessed a portion in Szil, but the greater part of his estates lay on the other side of the Danube, in Bodrog County. As a familiaris of Újlaki, he served as vice-ispán of Bodrog County in 1448. The Bodó de Dada sub-branch descended from him.

Gregory was one of the envoys sent to Vienna to negotiate with Frederick III concerning the status of the infant king Ladislaus V in March 1446. Thereafter, Újlaki sent him to the Hungarian capital Buda in order to serve his ally John Hunyadi, Regent of Hungary. In this capacity, he was one of the castellans of Buda from 1451 to 1455. During his service, his son Caspar, who attended the University of Vienna too, also became a member of the royal household; he was mentioned as a courtly knight in 1454. For Gregory and Nicholas, their social advancement also made it possible to expand their estates in Tolna County. Since the 1450s, their estate Györgyi was referred to as oppidum (i.e. market town). They acquired the lands Bágyon, Kajmát and Gerenás (all laid around their seat Mágocs and Györgyi) in Tolna County. Under Hunyadi's service, Gregory acquired further possessions in other parts of the kingdom (in Nógrád, Hont, Bars and Pest counties. Gregory founded and erected a monastery for the Order of Friars Minor next to the St. Gregory church in Györgyi prior to 1459. He handed over the church to the Franciscan friars. He built another church in Györgyi prior to 1459, dedicated to St. Nicholas, which became the new parish church of the settlement. Upon his own request, in 1459, Pope Pius II granted indulgences to the new church, which Bodó endowed with donations and where eight priests served (in that era, this was an outstanding figure), and to the St. Gregory monastery of the Order of Friars Minor.

Following the death of John Hunyadi in 1456, the young Caspar was a political ally of Ladislaus Hunyadi against the aspirations of Ulrich II of Celje. After Hunyadi was arrested and executed in March 1457, Caspar was among the nobles, who were arrested and held in captivity together with the future monarch Matthias. Gregory returned to the service of Nicholas Újlaki. Under his rule, he served as (vice)-ispán of Tolna County from the spring of 1458 to his death in 1459. Beside that, the new monarch Matthias Corvinus (son of Hunyadi) appointed him Master of the treasury in July 1458. Thus, Gregory became one of the barons of the realm. At the peak of his career, he died around May 1459. His elder son Caspar succeeded him as ispán and became head of the family. His another son was Roland, whose name, however, appears in local legal cases only.

The seals of Nicholas (left) and Caspar Bodó (right) from 1462

In February 1459, Nicholas (II) and his nephew Caspar were among the nobles who took a written oath of allegiance to King Matthias Corvinus, who faced a conspiracy, led by Ladislaus Garai and Nicholas Újlaki, against his rule. Shortly thereafter, Nicholas was appointed secret chancellor of the royal court. He was member of Matthias' inner council in the next five years. Beside that, Bodó was also made chief justice or personalis, heading the king's court of "personal presence". Bodó simultaneously held his positions of secret chancellor and chief justice until 1464. He took part in the negotiations with Emperor Frederick III in Sopron in the summer of 1463, which aimed to recover the Holy Crown of Hungary. Meanwhile, Caspar was appointed Master of the stewards in late 1458 or early 1459. He is first mentioned in this capacity in March 1459. As mentioned above, he succeeded his father Gregory as ispán of Tolna County too. He held the dignity at least until 1470, however, it is conceivable that he held the title continuously until the end of his life, in several instances concurrently with other nobles. He served as Master of the stewards until the first months of 1461, when he was made Master of the horse. He held the latter dignity until 1462. After the judicial reform introduced in 1464, Nicholas was replaced as chief justice and secret chancellor, and never rose to a bishopric. Simultaneously, Caspar was also excluded from political life for decades, but none of them fell from royal favor.

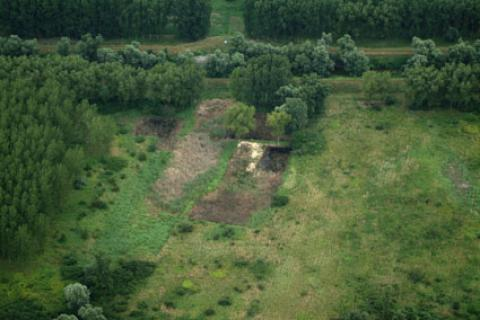
The remnants of the castle of Anya (in Sióagárd), erected by the Bodós in the early 1480s

In 1464, Nicholas and Caspar bought the estates Vaszar, Almás, Bágyon, Nyires (near present-day Mágocs) and Bikágy (near Kölesd) from the neighboring Macedóniai family. However, at the time of the formal installation, he and his relatives encountered various objections, and they would later engage in a protracted lawsuit over these possessions. The Bodó family acquired the estate Szil from the powerful Rozgonyi family. Nicholas constructed an own chapel within the Basilica of the Assumption of the Blessed Virgin Mary. Three stone carvings were preserved, one of them with his coat-of-arms, from the ruins of the basilica. Two fragments of his red marble grave slab were also discovered. The long-time provost died in 1474. Caspar had numerous conflicts against the Cseh de Léva family over estates in Bodrog County in the 1460s–1470s. He constructed a castle or fortified manor in his estate Anya on one of the islands of the marshy Sárvíz around 1480. For the construction, he had timber brought in from Poland, the import duty on which King Matthias waived in 1483. Caspar returned to the elite in 1482, when he was appointed Marshal (or Door-keeper) of the Queen's Court, i.e. he administered and managed the household of Queen Beatrice of Naples, the spouse of King Matthias. He held the position until June 1490. After Matthias' death, Caspar swore loyalty to Vladislaus II, becoming a member of his royal council in his early regnal years. He died in 1298; with his death the Bodó family no longer belonged to the aristocracy.

Provost Nicholas (II) paved the way for his nephews' careers through his ecclesiastical influence. Matthias, the son of Andrew, attended the University of Vienna from 1464 to 1466. Under his uncle, he served as lector of the collegiate chapter of Székesfehérvár between 1468 and 1474. This Matthias was involved in his family's lawsuits in 1464 and 1466. The provost's another nephew, Nicholas (III) – who was plausibly the youngest son of Gregory – studied and taught at the University of Bologna in 1469–1473, becoming rector of the ultramontanes. He was a canon of Székesfehérvár in 1482. He held various benefices in the Archdiocese of Kalocsa and the Diocese of Syrmia prior to 1493. He was provost of Marót (present-day Morović, Serbia), then archdeacon of Tolna from 1495 to 1496. He became custos (guardian) of Pécs by 1503.

==== Bodó de Dada ====
The Bodó de Dada family remained among the minor nobility. After decades of litigation, John (I) reached an agreement with the Baki family concerning the estate Dada in 1466; following the course of lost lawsuits, which stemmed from the arbitrary seizure back in 1446 (see above), John was forced to hand over his portion in Dada, half of the nearby Felsődada and half of the right of patronage over the parish church in Dada to the sons of Nicholas Baki. Prior to his death, he took the village Alsógyönk as a pledge from Gregory Kalozsnyói. In 1471, his sons – Stephen (I), Nicholas (IV) and John (II) – were in conflict with the Dominican nuns of Rabbits' Island over their possessions in Dada. Their cause was taken up by their relative, Provost Nicholas (II) from the senior branch. the conflict involved numerous mutual wrongs (killings, acts of destruction, violent actions). The two parties reached an out-of-court settlement, as part of this, the nuns paid 20 gold florins to the provost. The members of the Bodó de Dada family also possessed some portions in Györgyi and Anya, that is why they sometimes appear with these prefixes as well. Stephen (I) is referred to as vice-ispán of Bodrog County in 1483. Stephen (II), who was plausibly the son of Stephen (I), was a canon of the cathedral chapter of Kalocsa in 1522. John's only daughter Beatrice married John Matucsinai, who originated from a noble family of Baranya County. In 1519, the couple possessed Alsógyönk, which, however, the Kalozsnyói family was prepared to redeem. They also possessed Nagykónyi in Tolna County. Beatrice and her husband refused to return Alsógyönk, and they did not lay claim to the deposit amount, which resulted in a lawsuit.

John (II) appears in contemporary sources through his violent actions against his neighbors in Somogy County, which ultimately brought about the downfall of his family. In 1510, he acted as a royal bailiff on behalf of King Vladislaus II. Prior to 1511, he had a fishpond excavated between his own estate – known as Merse (laid near Gölle) – and the estate of the Dominican nuns of Rabbits' Island – also called Merse – which extended over approximately half of the nuns' territory; the water from this pond caused damage amounting to more than 1,000 gold florins to the hayfields belonging to the nuns' serfs, and although the estate became completely depopulated as a result of this damage, John nonetheless refused to provide any compensation. He also plundered and devastated the landholdings of the Zselicszentjakab Abbey. As a result, King Louis II confiscated his estates in Somogy and Tolna counties and donated them to Francis Hédervári, Ban of Belgrade in 1520. John objected against the decision. In late 1522 or early 1523, he murdered his wife Margaret Sólyagi (whose first husband was Lawrence Sárkány) with premeditated intent. As a result, he became disgraced and Palatine Stephen Báthory confiscated his all domains and donated them to his faithful servants Francis Révay and Stephen Révay in January 1523. The family of the murdered wife’s first husband also received a share of his wealth. John, having lost his entire fortune and become a fugitive, set fire to his own manor in Dada and hired assassins to target those who had taken possession of his estates. For this reason, in December 1524, Louis II instructed all authorities to apprehend the fugitive John and sentence him to death.

=== Decline ===
Caspar's wealth was inherited by his sons Francis and (possibly) Emeric. They also had a sister Anne, who married Francis Jakcs de Kusaly. As a representative of Tolna County, Francis attended the diets in 1505, 1514, 1518 and 1525, while Emeric, who possessed a portion in Mesztegnyő, was mentioned as an official of Francis Hédervári in 1514. Francis married Elizabeth Ráskai, the daughter of Blaise Ráskai, who served as Master of the treasury from 1498 to 1517. A horse forehead ornament with the coats-of-arms of the couple were preserved from the early 16th century, perhaps it was made for the occasion of their wedding; later, a third coat-of-arms and a carnelian bearing the year 1565 were added to it. Their eldest daughter Anne was born around 1510, while his only son Farkas and his younger daughter Catherine were born prior to 1517. Francis made a last will and testament in 1517, which is one of the earliest Hungarian-language documents of this kind.

The first page of Francis Bodó's last will, written in Hungarian, from 1517

For his service and loyalty, Vladislaus II confirmed the ownership right of Francis and his heirs over the lordships of Györgyi and the fortress Anyavár in 1510. Consequently, this privilege extended to inheritance through the female line as well. Altogether, Francis possessed estates and portions in 43 villages in Tolna County and nine villages in Somogy County. In 1514, Francis defended his fort of Anyavár against the peasant insurgents during György Dózsa's rebellion. In 1518, as one of the representatives of the lesser nobility (the so-called noble jurors), Francis was elected to the royal council of the young Louis II. Still in 1518, upon his request, the monarch confirmed and transcribed his father's confirmation letter from 1510 for him and his son Farkas. Francis entered the service of the powerful Zápolya family by the early 1520s, which represented an investment in the longer term, but at the time signaled a decline in social status compared to his father and grandfather. As a familiaris and a frontier soldier of John and George Zápolya, he took part in the defense of the southern border against the Ottoman raids.

A horse forehead ornament from the early 16th century, which depicts the coats-of-arms of Francis Bodó and his wife, Elizabeth Ráskai

After the Battle of Mohács in August 1526, the Turks penetrated the central region of Hungary; in September 1526, they had plundered and devastated the whole region, including the estates of the Bodó family in the lordships of Györgyi and Anyavár. The Franciscans left the monastery, and although they later returned, Francis gradually shifted his base of operations to his estates in Somogy County; contemporary sources frequently referred to him and his descendants by the predicate "de Mesztegnyő," indicating that they had established themselves in Mesztegnyő. During the emerging civil war between Ferdinand I and John Zápolya for the Hungarian crown, Francis was a staunch supporter of Zápolya's claim. As a captain of Veszprém, Francis administered a significant part of Transdanubia on behalf of his king until Ferdinand's campaign into Hungary in the summer of 1527. Retreating to the eastern part of the kingdom and Transylvania, Francis fought in the Battle of Tarcal and successfully occupied Eger, before he was captured by Ferdinand's army in December 1527, He did not renounce his loyalty to Zápolya, and therefore died in captivity in Wiener Neustadt.

Another family member was Peter, who was possibly the son of Emeric. He actively fought in the Southern Transdanubian fights during the civil war. He was a confidant of John Zápolya, who appointed him ispán of Somogy County. Alongside Tamás Nádasdy, he fought against the Turks and the Habsburgs in the region of Pécs. In 1529, Peter had his servants fish out the fishpond of the Habsburg-aligned Stephen Báthory in Szenyér, causing him 100 gold florins' worth of damage. In August 1530, the pro-Habsburg Bálint Török defeated the army of Peter at Székesfehérvár. He attended the diet at Bélavár in March 1531, which sought to put an end to the civil war between Ferdinand and John Zápolya. Following the death of John Szerecsen in July 1532, Peter became captain of the castle of Pécs and the administrator of episcopal assets without the king's knowledge and consent. In November 1533, Stephanus Brodericus mentions in his letter that Peter's estates in the region have been occupied, which constitutes a clear violation of the ceasefire between the two parties. Peter died by 1534, when his widow is mentioned as a landowner in Mesztegnyő.

The last male member of the family was Farkas (or Wolfgang), whose mother Elizabeth Ráskai participated in the management of the estates too (she is last mentioned in 1550). He possessed 77,5 portions in about 20 villages throughout in Tolna County in 1542 (with this, he nominally still belonged among the more prominent landowners in the region), but due to the constant Turkish threat, they gradually became depopulated and yielded less and less benefit to him. The Ottomans conquered entire Southern Transdanubia in 1543; the Franciscans left the monastery for good, along with the local population in Györgyi. He possessed Mágocs too, after its abbot left, but he leased the estate to the residents of Csurgó. According to a census from 1559, only two houses remained in Farkas' possession in Györgyi. Farkas possessed Szabaton (laid near Gyönk) in Somogy County in 1561. He died sometime before 1564, with which the Bodó de Györgyi family became extinct. Accordingly, his wealth and possessions in Tolna and Somogy counties were inherited by the sons of his sister Anne and Benedict Bajoni. However, Matthias Allya, a confidant of Nikola IV Zrinski, obtained a royal grant for the lordship of Anyavár (including Anya, Györgyi and Mágocs, etc.) as early as 1561, and thus his family laid claim to the inheritance. Zrinski became the guardian of the minor Christopher Allya after the death of his father, and litigation began between him and the Bajoni family over the Bodó–Ráskai inheritance. Subsequent Ottoman campaigns rendered these lawsuits pointless (for instance, both Zrinski and John Bajoni were killed in the Siege of Szigetvár). In 1566, the estates passed to Sophia Bajoni, Thereafter, the estates were inherited through the female line from generation to generation, and gradually became fragmented.

== Family tree ==
- Bodó (fl. 1338)
  - Nicholas I
    - Michael (fl. 1399) → Dada sub-branch
      - John I (fl. 1440–1466) ∞ Agatha Helesfalvi (fl. 1440)
        - Stephen I (fl. 1471–1483)
          - (?) Stephen II (fl. 1522)
        - Nicholas IV (fl. 1471)
        - John II (fl. 1471–1524) ∞ Margaret Sólyagi (1522/1523†)
        - Beatrice (fl. 1519) ∞ John Matucsinai
    - James (fl. 1399)
      - Gregory (fl. 1424–1459†)
        - Caspar (fl. 1447–1498†)
          - Francis (fl. 1493–1537†) ∞ Elizabeth Ráskai (fl. 1510–1550)
            - Anne (fl. 1510–1557) ∞ Benedict Bajoni (d. before 1547)
            - Farkas (fl. 1517–1561; d. before 1564), last male member
            - Catherine (fl. 1517)
          - Anne (fl. 1493) ∞ Francis Jakcs de Kusaly
          - (?) Emeric (fl. 1514)
            - (?) Peter (fl. 1529–1533; d. before 1534)
        - Roland (fl. 1464–1472)
        - (?) Nicholas III (fl. 1472–1503)
      - Andrew (fl. 1441–1448)
        - Matthias (fl. 1464–1474)
      - Nicholas II (fl. 1432–1474†)
      - Dominic (fl. 1446)

== Sources ==
- Brodericus, Stephanus (2012). Kasza, Péter (ed.). Epistulae [Letters] (in Latin and English). Argumentum Kiadó – National Archives of Hungary. ISBN 978-963-446-660-4.
- C. Tóth, Norbert; Horváth, Richárd; Neumann, Tibor; Pálosfalvi, Tamás (2016). Magyarország világi archontológiája, 1458–1526, I. Főpapok és bárók [Secular Archontology of Hungary, 1458–1526, Volume I: Prelates and Barons] (in Hungarian). MTA Bölcsészettudományi Kutatóközpont Történettudományi Intézete. ISBN 978-963-4160-35-9.
- C. Tóth, Norbert; Horváth, Richárd; Neumann, Tibor; Pálosfalvi, Tamás; W. Kovács, András (2017). Magyarország világi archontológiája, 1458–1526, II. Megyék [Secular Archontology of Hungary, 1458–1526, Volume II: Counties] (in Hungarian). MTA Bölcsészettudományi Kutatóközpont Történettudományi Intézete. ISBN 978-963-4160-85-4.
- C. Tóth, Norbert (2019). A kalocsa-bácsi főegyházmegye káptalanjainak középkori archontológiája [Medieval Archontology of the Chapters of the Archdiocese of Kalocsa–Bács] (in Hungarian). Kalocsai Főegyházmegyei Levéltár. ISBN 978-615-5940-01-9.
- Engel, Pál; Lővei, Pál (1983). "Székesfehérvári kőfaragványok Györgyi Bodó Miklós prépost címerével [Stone Carvings from Székesfehérvár bearing the Coat of Arms of Provost Miklós Bodó de Györgyi]". Művészettörténeti Értesítő (in Hungarian). 32 (1): 1–7. ISSN 0027-5247.
- Engel, Pál (1996). Magyarország világi archontológiája, 1301–1457, I. [Secular Archontology of Hungary, 1301–1457, Volume I] (in Hungarian). História, MTA Történettudományi Intézete. ISBN 963-8312-44-0.
- Köblös, József (1994). Az egyházi középréteg Mátyás és a Jagellók korában [The Middle Layer of Churchmen in the Age of Matthias and the Jagiellonian Kings] (in Hungarian). Társadalom- és művelődéstörténeti tanulmányok 12., MTA Történettudományi Intézete. ISBN 963-8312-18-1.
- Markó, László (2006). A magyar állam főméltóságai Szent Istvántól napjainkig: Életrajzi Lexikon [Great Officers of State in Hungary from King Saint Stephen to Our Days: A Biographical Encyclopedia] (in Hungarian). Helikon Kiadó. ISBN 963-208-970-7.
- Ribi, András (2024). "Az utolsó Fehérvárra temetett prépost. Adalékok Györgyi Bodó Miklós (†1474) életrajzához [The last provost buried in Székesfehérvár. Contributions to the biography of Miklós Györgyi Bodó (†1474)]". Ars Hungarica (in Hungarian). 50 (4): 369–382. ISSN 0133-1531.
- Tímár, György (2001). "Mágocs története a Rákóczi szabadságharcig [The History of Mágocs until Rákóczi's War of Independence]". In Füzes, Miklós (ed.). Mágocs 1251–2001 (in Hungarian). Municipality of Mágocs. pp. 49–76. ISBN 963-00-6948-2.
- Tóth, Boglárka (2002). Gaál, Attila (ed.). "A középkori Györgyi és ferences kolostorának azonosítása [Identification of the Medieval Village and the Franciscan Monastery of Györgyi]". A Wosinszky Mór Múzeum Évkönyve (in Hungarian). 24: 133–145. ISSN 0865-5464.
