= Caspar Bodó =

- Seal of Caspar Bodó, 1462

Marshal of the Queen's Court
- Reign: 1482–1490
- Predecessor: Nicholas Szécsi
- Successor: John Perényi
- Born: 1420s
- Died: 1498
- Noble family: House of Bodó
- Issue: Francis; Anne; Emeric (?)
- Father: Gregory Bodó

Caspar Bodó de Györgyi (Hungarian: györgyi Bodó Gáspár; died 1498) was a Hungarian nobleman in the 15th century, who served as Master of the stewards from 1459 to 1461, and as Master of the horse from 1461 to 1462. He was a faithful confidant of King Matthias Corvinus. At the end of his life, he administered the queen's court.

== Early life ==
Caspar Bodó was born in the mid-1420s into the Bodó de Györgyi noble family, which possessed landholdings in Tolna County and originated from the ancient gens (clan) Szentemágócs. His father was Gregory, who rose to the upper elite under the service of Nicholas Újlaki and John Hunyadi since the 1440s. His uncle was Nicholas (II), the provost of Székesfehérvár. He had a brother Roland, whose name, however, appears in local legal cases only. It is possible that he had another brother, the cleric Nicholas (III).

Bodó spent his juvenile years together with Ladislaus, the son of Regent John Hunyadi, in Buda, where his father served as a castellan. Matthias' court chronicler Antonio Bonfini writes in his work Rerum Hungaricarum decades that Caspar Bodó was a "noble, intelligent, eloquent, and experienced man". With the support of his father and uncle, the young Caspar attended the University of Vienna in 1447. Returning Hungary, he entered royal service, participating in the administration governed by Regent Hunyadi; he is referred to as a courtly knight in June 1454, when King Ladislaus V commissioned him to deliver his letter to Francesco Foscari, Doge of Venice. Caspar Bodó, as royal envoy, was mandated to convey the king's wishes to the doge orally as well. Belonging to the Szilágyi–Hunyadi league after John Hunyadi's death, Bodó was a political ally of Ladislaus Hunyadi against the aspirations of Ulrich II of Celje. Their confrontation led to Ulrich's assassination in November 1456. Ladislaus Hunyadi was arrested and executed on a charge of plotting against the king in March 1457. Caspar Bodó was among the nobles, who were arrested in Buda too, and were held in captivity together with the future monarch Matthias.

== Career ==
After the election of Matthias as King of Hungary in January 1458, political horizons opened up for the Bodó family, offering a path to social advancement. Caspar's father Gregory was appointed Master of the treasury. In February 1459, Caspar Bodó, together with his uncle Provost Nicholas, were among the nobles who took a written oath of allegiance to King Matthias Corvinus, who faced a conspiracy, led by Ladislaus Garai and Nicholas Újlaki, against his rule. While his father was still alive, Caspar Bodó was appointed Master of the stewards in late 1458 or early 1459. He is first mentioned in this capacity in March 1459. When his father died around May 1459, Bodó succeeded him as ispán of Tolna County too. He held the dignity at least until 1470, however, it is conceivable that he held the title continuously until the end of his life, in several instances concurrently with other nobles (such as members of the Dombai family) as well as with Nicholas Újlaki, who possessed half of the income associated with the title. Bodó served as Master of the stewards until the first months of 1461, when he was made Master of the horse. He held the latter dignity until 1462. He acted as an envoy of Matthias to Laxenburg in September 1461, when Frederick III, Holy Roman Emperor concluded a truce with his younger brother Albert VI of Austria. His seal was preserved from May 1462. He was styled as a former office-holder already in June 1462.

Despite he was replaced as Master of the horse, Bodó remained a member of the royal court. Although he was a royal councillor, he did not become a large landowner in the following decades. In August 1462, he successfully requested Matthias to grant the right to hold a fair twice a year for the town Igal in Somogy County, which was a property of the Benedictine nuns of Rabbits' Island and which enjoyed Bodó's protection. Amidst the Ottoman threat, Bodó, together with his uncle Nicholas and Gregory Dersanóci, convened an assembly for the Székelys in the autumn of 1462, upon the order of the Hungarian monarch. In February 1463, the king, at his intercession, exempted the people of the aforementioned monastery from the obligation to pay the chamber's profit (Latin: lucrum camerae).

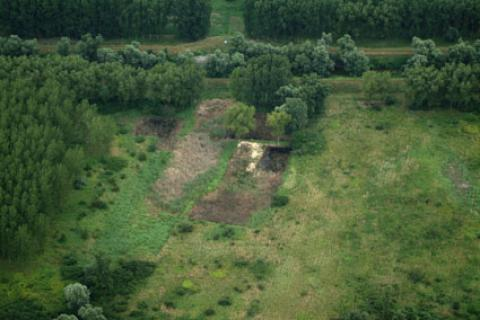
The remnants of the castle of Anya (in Sióagárd), erected by Bodó in the early 1480s

After this, Bodó was excluded from political life for decades. In 1464, together with his uncle, he bought the estates Vaszar, Almás, Bágyon, Nyires (near present-day Mágocs) and Bikágy (near Kölesd) in Tolna County from the neighboring Macedóniai family. However, at the time of the formal installation, he and his relatives encountered various objections, and they would later engage in a protracted lawsuit over these possessions. Bodó pledged his estates in Bodrog County to Archbishop Stephen Várdai in November 1465. Ladislaus Cseh de Léva complained in the next month that Bodó unlawfully seized his estates in Bodrog County. To examine this, the county assembly was convened at Cseh's initiative, but Bodó gathered 400 armed men at the scene and dispersed the assembly through threats and violence. King Matthias ordered an investigation and summoned Bodó before his court in January 1466. In the 1460s, Cseh lodged numerous complaints against the unlawful actions of Caspar Bodó and his uncle, Nicholas Bodó in Bodrog County. In 1470, Caspar Bodó and his kinship acquired the estate Szil from the powerful Rozgonyi family, in exchange for 600 florins and the land Sáros in Esztergom County. His lawsuits against the Töttösis, then the Várdais over the aforementioned estates in Tolna County lasted for decades. The latter also attempted to undermine Bodó through political means, reporting to the Diet that he had placed himself at the head of a movement in the county opposing the extraordinary taxation imposed by King Matthias. Bodó constructed a castle or fortified manor in his estate Anya (laid near Sióagárd) on one of the islands of the marshy Sárvíz around 1480. For the construction, he had timber brought in from Poland, the import duty on which King Matthias waived in 1483.

Bodó returned to the elite in 1482, when he was appointed Marshal (or Door-keeper) of the Queen's Court, i.e. he administered and managed the household of Queen Beatrice of Naples, the spouse of King Matthias. He held the position until June 1490. After a decade-long hiatus, he was again styled as ispán of Tolna County since November 1486, when he acted as a plenipotentiary judge appointed by the king to hear and resolve the grievances of the nobles of Croatia, Dalmatia and Slavonia on the occasion of a convened general assembly. In the event that he did not hold the position continuously, it is possible that he obtained the position through the intercession of Queen Beatrice, who was granted the lordship of Simontornya; she handed over half of the county's income in 1483 and the whole of it after 1485 to Bodó. After Matthias died in April 1490, Bodó and Aladar Várdai were commissioned to transport the king's body, which lay in a sarcophagus, from Vienna to Buda, then from Buda to Székesfehérvár.

Following the death of Matthias, which resulted a succession crisis, Bodó was a member of the inner council centered around Queen Beatrice and John Corvinus (Matthias' illegitimate son). He attended that diet on 17 June 1490, where they promise John that, should he not be chosen as king, he will receive the titles of Duke of Slavonia and King of Bosnia. In the following weeks, Bodó joined the allegiance of Vladislaus II, who entered Hungary in July 1490. He was a member of the royal council under Vladislaus in the following years. Since 1492, when he attended the diet in that year, he was referred to as "egregius" instead of "magnificus", indicating that, despite his presence at court, he was no longer counted among the most influential and wealthiest barons of the realm. Bodó last appears as ispán of Tolna County in May 1496. He died in 1298, prior to July of that year. His wealth was inherited by his sons Francis and possibly Emeric. He also had a daughter Anne, who married Francis Jakcs de Kusaly.

== Sources ==
=== Primary sources ===
- Bonfini, Antonio (2019). A magyar történelem tizedei [History of Hungary in Ten Volumes] (in Hungarian). Translated by Kulcsár, Péter. Osiris Kiadó. ISBN 978-963-276-339-2.

=== Secondary sources ===
- C. Tóth, Norbert; Horváth, Richárd; Neumann, Tibor; Pálosfalvi, Tamás (2016). Magyarország világi archontológiája, 1458–1526, I. Főpapok és bárók [Secular Archontology of Hungary, 1458–1526, Volume I: Prelates and Barons] (in Hungarian). MTA Bölcsészettudományi Kutatóközpont Történettudományi Intézete. ISBN 978-963-4160-35-9.
- C. Tóth, Norbert; Horváth, Richárd; Neumann, Tibor; Pálosfalvi, Tamás; W. Kovács, András (2017). Magyarország világi archontológiája, 1458–1526, II. Megyék [Secular Archontology of Hungary, 1458–1526, Volume II: Counties] (in Hungarian). MTA Bölcsészettudományi Kutatóközpont Történettudományi Intézete. ISBN 978-963-4160-85-4.
- Engel, Pál; Lővei, Pál (1983). "Székesfehérvári kőfaragványok Györgyi Bodó Miklós prépost címerével [Stone Carvings from Székesfehérvár bearing the Coat of Arms of Provost Miklós Bodó de Györgyi]". Művészettörténeti Értesítő (in Hungarian). 32 (1): 1–7. ISSN 0027-5247.
- Engel, Pál (1996). Magyarország világi archontológiája, 1301–1457, I. [Secular Archontology of Hungary, 1301–1457, Volume I] (in Hungarian). História, MTA Történettudományi Intézete. ISBN 963-8312-44-0.
- Kubinyi, András (1988). "Bárók a királyi tanácsban Mátyás és II. Ulászló idejében [Barons in the Royal Council during the Reigns of Matthias and Vladislaus II]". Századok (in Hungarian). 122 (1–2). Magyar Történelmi Társulat: 147–215. ISSN 0039-8098.
- Ribi, András (2024). "Az utolsó Fehérvárra temetett prépost. Adalékok Györgyi Bodó Miklós (†1474) életrajzához [The last provost buried in Székesfehérvár. Contributions to the biography of Miklós Györgyi Bodó (†1474)]". Ars Hungarica (in Hungarian). 50 (4): 369–382. ISSN 0133-1531.
- Tímár, György (2001). "Mágocs története a Rákóczi szabadságharcig [The History of Mágocs until Rákóczi's War of Independence]". In Füzes, Miklós (ed.). Mágocs 1251–2001 (in Hungarian). Municipality of Mágocs. pp. 49–76. ISBN 963-00-6948-2.
- Tóth, Boglárka (2002). Gaál, Attila (ed.). "A középkori Györgyi és ferences kolostorának azonosítása [Identification of the Medieval Village and the Franciscan Monastery of Györgyi]". A Wosinszky Mór Múzeum Évkönyve (in Hungarian). 24: 133–145. ISSN 0865-5464.

Caspar House of Bodó Born: 1420s Died: 1498
Political offices
Preceded by Andrew Báthory	Master of the stewards alongside John Pongrác since 1460; 1459–1461	Succeeded by John Pongrác
Preceded by Paul Dombai	Master of the horse alongside Paul Dombai; 1461–1462	Succeeded by Ladislaus Vezsenyi
Preceded by Nicholas Szécsi	Marshal of the Queen's Court; 1482–1490	Succeeded by John Perényi
