= Ferenc Bodó =

- A horse forehead ornament from the early 16th century, which depicts the coats-of-arms of Bodó and his wife
- Died: 1537; Wiener Neustadt, Archduchy of Austria, Habsburg monarchy
- Noble family: House of Bodó
- Spouse: Erzsébet Ráskai
- Issue: Anna; Farkas; Katalin
- Father: Caspar Bodó

Ferenc Bodó de Györgyi (Hungarian: györgyi Bodó Ferenc; died 1537) was a Hungarian nobleman and soldier in the first decades of the 16th century. As a prominent partisan of John Zápolya, one of the claimants to the Hungarian throne after the Battle of Mohács, he fought in the 1526–1529 civil war.

== Family background ==
The first page of Bodó's last will, written in Hungarian, from 1517

Ferenc (Francis) Bodó was born possibly in the late 1470s into the Bodó de Györgyi noble family, which possessed landholdings in Tolna County and originated from the ancient gens (clan) Szentemágócs. His father was Caspar Bodó, an influential courtier during the reign of Matthias Corvinus. It is possible that his younger brother was Imre (Emeric), who was an official of Ferenc Hédervári in 1514. Ferenc also had a sister Anna, who married nobleman Ferenc Jakcs de Kusaly. The family's estates laid around their centres, the oppidum Györgyi and the fortified manor of Anyavár (laid near present-day Mágocs and Sióagárd, respectively).

Sometime between 1505 and 1510, Bodó married Erzsébet Ráskai, the daughter of Blaise Ráskai, who served as Master of the treasury from 1498 to 1517. A horse forehead ornament with the coats-of-arms of Ferenc Bodó and Erzsébet Ráskai were preserved from the early 16th century, perhaps it was made for the occasion of their wedding; later, a third coat-of-arms and a carnelian bearing the year 1565 were added to it. Their eldest daughter Anna was born around 1510, while his only son Farkas and his younger daughter Katalin were born prior to 1517.

For unknown reasons, Bodó made a last will and testament in his estate Potoly in Tolna County (now a borough of Fürged) on 25 April 1517. The document, written by hand in the Hungarian language, is a valuable linguistic-historical relic. By that time, his son Farkas and his younger daughter Katalin were born. The beginning of the document, where he likely listed his estates, is missing. In the document, Bodó divided all his movable property into five parts among his wife and his three children and for his spiritual salvation. He also left sums of money and valuables to the churches of Györgyi and Anyavár, as well as to the Palace Chapel in Buda Castle. In the event of his wife's death, he designated Pál Dombai and Miklós Macedóniai, both were influential lords in Tolna County, as guardians of his minor children. He appointed his father-in-law, his wife, the two aforementioned lords and Miklós Szabari as the executors of his last will and testament.

== Career ==
=== Under the Jagiellonians ===
He is first mentioned by a contemporary record in 1493, when his father, also on behalf of his son, reached a settlement with the Várdai family during the course of a lawsuit concerning their estates in Tolna County. Accordingly, the Bodós retained Vaszar, Almás and Bágyon and the half portion of Nyires (near present-day Mágocs) and Bikágy (near Kölesd). His father died in 1498, thus Ferenc – as his sole heir – inherited his wealth, as well as the ongoing lawsuit against the Knights Hospitaller. With the death of Caspar, the Bodó family fell from the aristocracy, but Ferenc remained a leading noble of Tolna County during the Jagiellonian era. As a representative of Tolna County, Bodó attended the Diet at Rákos in 1505, where the nobles passed a bill which prohibited the election of a foreigner as king if King Vladislaus II died without male issue. For his service and loyalty, Vladislaus II confirmed the ownership right of Bodó and his heirs – his wife and his infant daughter Anna – over the lordships of Györgyi and the fortress Anyavár in 1510. Consequently, this privilege extended to inheritance through the female line as well. Altogether, Bodó possessed estates and portions in 43 villages in Tolna County and nine villages in Somogy County.

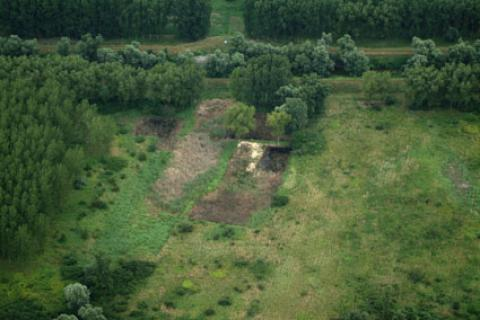
The remnants of the castle of Anya (in Sióagárd), the centre of Bodó's domains until 1526

Bodó attended the national diet in March–April 1514, where he served as one of the spokesmen and delegates of the petty nobility. When the peasant rebellion led by György Dózsa broke out in the spring of 1514, a larger unit of the insurgents gathered near Anyavár. This army of 7,000 men laid siege to the fort, defended by Bodó and his men, in June 1514. Led by Ferenc Hédervári, lord of Ozora, the army of the nobility of Tolna County relieved those under siege, after reaching an agreement with the insurgents following several unsuccessful assaults. In 1517, Bodó had a dispute with the Franciscan monastery in the market town Györgyi, which was founded by his grandfather Gregory. Bodó complained to the Holy See that the Franciscans pawned the valuable religious objects that his family had given them over the decades. The monks used the money for the renovation and expansion of other religious houses. The Roman Curia ordered that the religious objects – as well as the money derived from them – be returned to Bodó. At the request of the Franciscans, Pope Leo X finally granted permission in 1519 for them to keep and use the sacred objects intended for divine worship.

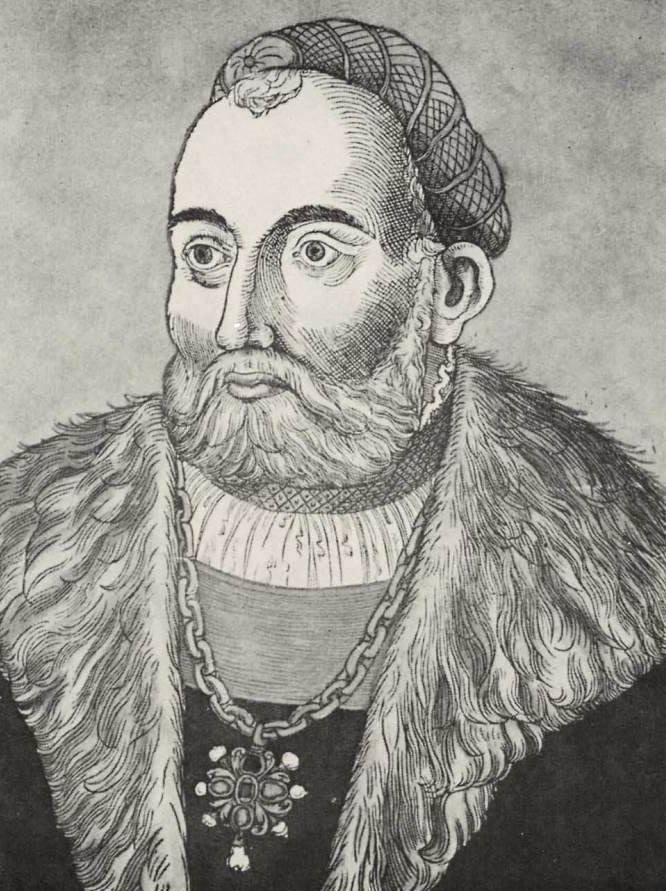
Portrait of John Zápolya

By the reign of Louis II of Hungary, Bodó retained his influence as a leading member of the county nobility. He represented Tolna County in the national diet convoked in August 1518. In the same year, as one of the representatives of the lesser nobility (the so-called noble jurors), Bodó was elected to the royal council of the young Louis II. Still in 1518, upon his request, the monarch confirmed and transcribed his father's confirmation letter from 1510 for Ferenc Bodó and his son Farkas.

Bodó entered the service of the powerful Zápolya family by the early 1520s, which represented an investment in the longer term, but at the time signaled a decline in social status compared to his father and grandfather. As a familiaris and a frontier soldier of John and George Zápolya, he took part in the defense of the southern border against the Ottoman raids. The 16th-century chronicler Miklós Istvánffy describes Bodó "a man most distinguished for his knowledge of the science of military discipline". He participated in the voivode's campaign into Wallachia in 1522. He joined the military campaign of John Zápolya against the Turks with 100 riders. He served as castellan of the easternmost frontier castle Barka laid along the river Sava (present-day Brčko in Bosnia and Herzegovina). In this capacity, he fought in the successful battle at Szávaszentdemeter against the Turks in 1523, commanding one of the six team units, as the court chronicler György Szerémi recorded. Thereafter, Bodó, a "famous cavalry captain" by that time, assisted Pál Tomori's efforts to strengthen the defense system along the southern border. He gained such a reputation in single combats against the Turks that, according to Szerémi, on one occasion, after being captured by the Turks, he was treated as a guest and then sent back to Voivode John Zápolya. As Szerémi notes Bodó "mounted his horse, clad in his finest knightly armor. He was a handsome man, and his lance never left his hand in vain; it always found its mark". As a captain of his household, he escorted Zápolya to the national diet at Buda in May 1525. There, Bodó used military force to prevent the looting of the house of Emeric Fortunatus, a treasurer accused of corruption, by enraged crowds of nobles. He received his outstanding military pay from the previous years there. He also attended the diet at Hatvan in June–July 1525. There, the Estates of the Realm donated to the landholdings of Ambrose Sárkány, who fell from favor. Due to rapid political changes, Bodó was never able to take possession of these landholdings. During the diet, the lower nobility wanted to elect Bodó as Ban of Croatia, but this did not materialize due to the king's resistance.

=== Zápolya's faithful captain ===
Ferenc Bodó was not present in the fateful Battle of Mohács on 29 August 1526, because he was with the army of his lord, John Zápolya, defending the Transylvanian border against a possible Ottoman invasion, as Miklós Istvánffy recorded in his chronicle Regni Hungarici historia. After defeating the royal army, the Turks penetrated the central region of Hungary; in September 1526, they had plundered and devastated the whole region, including the estates of Bodó in the lordships of Györgyi and Anyavár. The Franciscans left the monastery, and although they later returned, Bodó gradually shifted his base of operations to his estates in Somogy County; contemporary sources frequently referred to him and his descendants by the predicate "de Mesztegnyő," indicating that they had established themselves in Mesztegnyő.

Bodó, as a member of his lord's entourage, attended the diet at Tokaj in October 1526, where the pro-Zápolya nobles decided to convene a diet in Székesfehérvár for the election and coronation of John Zápolya as King of Hungary. The ceremony took place on 11 November 1526. Meanwhile, gathering his army on behalf of his king, Bodó marched from Tokaj and captured the castle of Eger in late November, as German chronicler Kaspar Ursinus Velius recorded. Bodó resided in Buda in the following months as a member of Zápolya's royal court. By that time, he established close alliance and political ties with Zápolya's other loyal courtiers, including István Werbőczy, János Bajoni and Mihály Szobi. He married off his daughter Anna to Benedek Bajoni, János' younger brother. In January 1527, King John Zápolya raised Bodó to the rank of baron and appointed him a permanent member of his inner royal council. The king entrusted Bodó to capture the episcopal see of Veszprém in the spring of 1527, since Bishop Tamás Szalaházy took the oath of allegiance to John's rival, Ferdinand of Habsburg and left the town for Pressburg. With the title of captain, Bodó administered the fortress and entire Veszprém County on behalf of John Zápolya. He received full authorization to use the revenues of the diocese and the county in order to strengthen Zápolya's power in southern Transdanubia. John Zápolya revoked the former royal pardon concerning Benigna Magyar, who was accused of murdering her third husband, and donated her confiscated fort Nagyvázsony to Bodó. The legal status was unresolved; in addition to proceedings that appeared to be a show trial, Werbőczy also laid claim to the estate. Given the events of the following months, Bodó hardly had time to take actual possession of it.

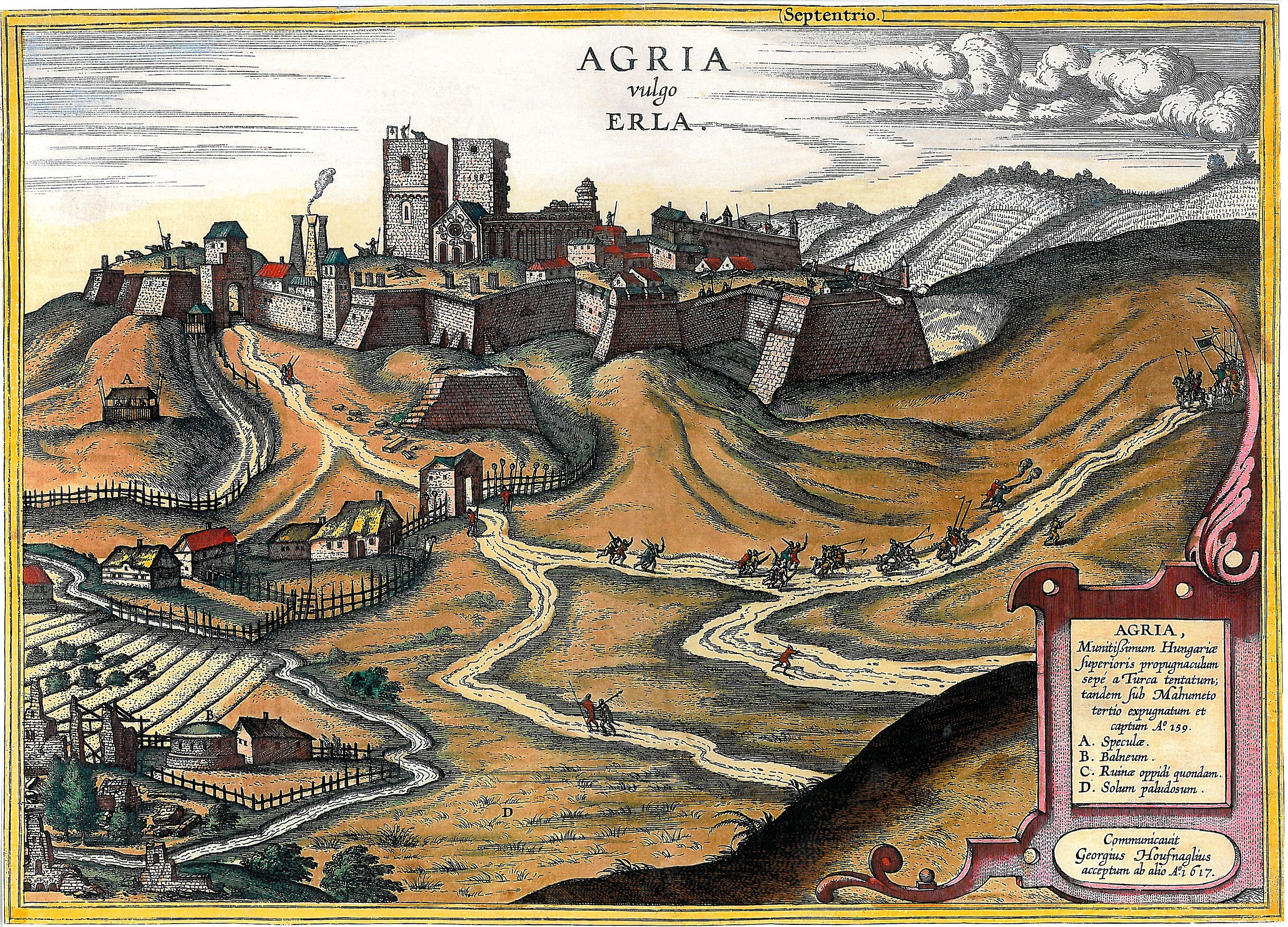
The Eger Castle on Georg Hoefnagel's map

After the failure of the diplomatic negotiations, King Ferdinand I launched an invasion against Zápolya's realm in the summer of 1527. As a result, numerous courtiers left Zápolya's allegiance, but Bodó remained loyal to his lord. The Habsburg troops captured the cities and fortresses one after another in Transdanubia. Upon Bodó's request, King John instructed the abbeys of Zirc, Bakonybél and Kapornak on 13 July to provide 100 foot soldiers each, with two months' pay, for the defense of Veszprém Castle. In the following weeks, however, the imperial forces completely drove Zápolya out of the western part of Hungary. When John Zápolya left the royal castle of Buda on 12 August, Bodó joined the fleeing entourage. In Hatvan, the king sent Bodó and Pavle Bakić back to the line of the Danube, to scout out the size of the army of imperial commander Casimir, Margrave of Brandenburg-Kulmbach, then Niklas Graf von Salm. Pursuing their troops, a 6,000-man imperial army led by Niklas von Salm crossed the river, besieged and captured the forts that lay along their way, including Eger, without resistance, and overtook Zápolya's fleeing army along the river Tisza near Tokaj by 26 September. The imperial army set up camp near Tarcal. That night, Ferenc Bodó and Lukács Kismarjai launched a surprise attack on their camp. During the assault, many were killed and several cannons were captured. Under the overall command of Bodó, the right wing, led by Bakić, repelled the Styrians, but the left wing, led by Kismarjai, was crushed by the Austrian mercenaries commanded by Leonhard von Fels and Johann Katzianer, and Kismarjai was among the killed. Simultaneously, the pro-Habsburg Hungarian hussars under Bálint Török and Lajos Pekry also broke through the center, where Bodó was in command. John Zápolya and his main army retreated to the Tisza, while Bodó continued the rear-guard action. As soon as John's forces crossed the river, they destroyed the bridge; consequently, Bodó – who had been wounded – and his unit became stranded on the far bank, and his army was routed. Many drowned in the river, and John Zápolya lost all his military equipment and tents, while many of the lords present (including Bakić) betrayed him and left his allegiance. Finally Bodó and his cavalry of two thousand men successfully crossed the river and hastened to Transylvania after Zápolya.

Bodó remained a member of John's inner council, which resided in Várad (present-day Oradea, Romania), commanding the royal cavalry. In an era of frequent changes of allegiance, Bodó remained loyal to Zápolya throughout. On 30 November 1527, Ferdinand I confiscated Bodó and other pro-Zápolya lords' lands in Transdanubia, citing lèse-majesté and treason, in addition to their involvement in the capture of Eger in the previous year. Alongside János Dóczy, Bodó was appointed captain of Kolozsvár (present-day Cluj-Napoca, Romania). In this capacity, they had captured the pro-Habsburg bishop János Gosztonyi and tortured him to death, according to the chronicler György Szerémi. Thereafter, Bodó took possession of the assets of the Diocese of Transylvania. In November 1527, Bodó gathered an army to recapture the castle of Eger, after Zápolya obtained a loan from Poland. Bodó hired Hungarian, Polish and Tatar mercenaries and irregular infantry called hajduk. His troops quickly took possession of the settlement, but the siege of the castle dragged on. Its garrison, which consisted of German mercenaries and Hungarian hussars under the command of castellan István Márkffy repelled successful breakout attempts on several occasions, inflicting heavy losses on Bodó's army. Finally, Bodó successfully captured the fortress on 14 December 1527. The pro-Ferdinand author Kaspar Ursinus Velius writes that Bodó exacted a brutal revenge for his losses: he ransacked and plundered the cathedral and its altar, while his men slaughtered the innocent civilians who had sought refuge there; he then adorned his horse with the religious and ecclesiastical regalia. He sent the jewels and the severed heads of the garrison officers to Zápolya. He also ordered to mutilate the prisoners of war, cutting off their ears and noses. In contrast, Bishop Tamás Szalaházy attributed these sins of to Ferenc Ercsy, Bodó's lieutenant.

=== Capture and imprisonment ===
Having learned of the unfavorable news, Ferdinand sent 1,200-size cavalry and 1,000-size infantry, under the commandment of Bálint Török, Lajos Pekry, Pavle Bakić and others, to recapture Eger. Their troops caught up with Bodó and his soldiers, who were withdrawing from Eger, at the nearby Mezőkeresztes. Due to its lack of organization and discipline, Bodó's army quickly scattered during the clash, which took place around 20 December 1527. The German mercenaries slaughtered many, while Bodó was wounded and captured. Szerémi writes that Bálint Török and Pavle Bakić captured Bodó by luring him into a trap, appealing to his sense of chivalrous honor. Ferdinand's soldiers returned with him to Eger, and the pro-Zápolya garrison, seeing that their leader had been taken captive, surrendered the fortress of their own accord. Bodó swore he would not escape, so his confinement was made less strict in Eger on 25–26 December. The chronicler Miklós Istvánffy narrates that, during a drunken revelry, he has escaped from the custody of Bálint Török, then, having secured a horse, made his way as far as Gyöngyös. There, however, he sobered up and remembered his oath, so he rode back to his pursuers, including Lajos Pekry, who were already searching for him all over the area. Szerémi also mentions the escape of Bodó, who, according to him, was led back to his captors by an innkeeper's words concerning honor.

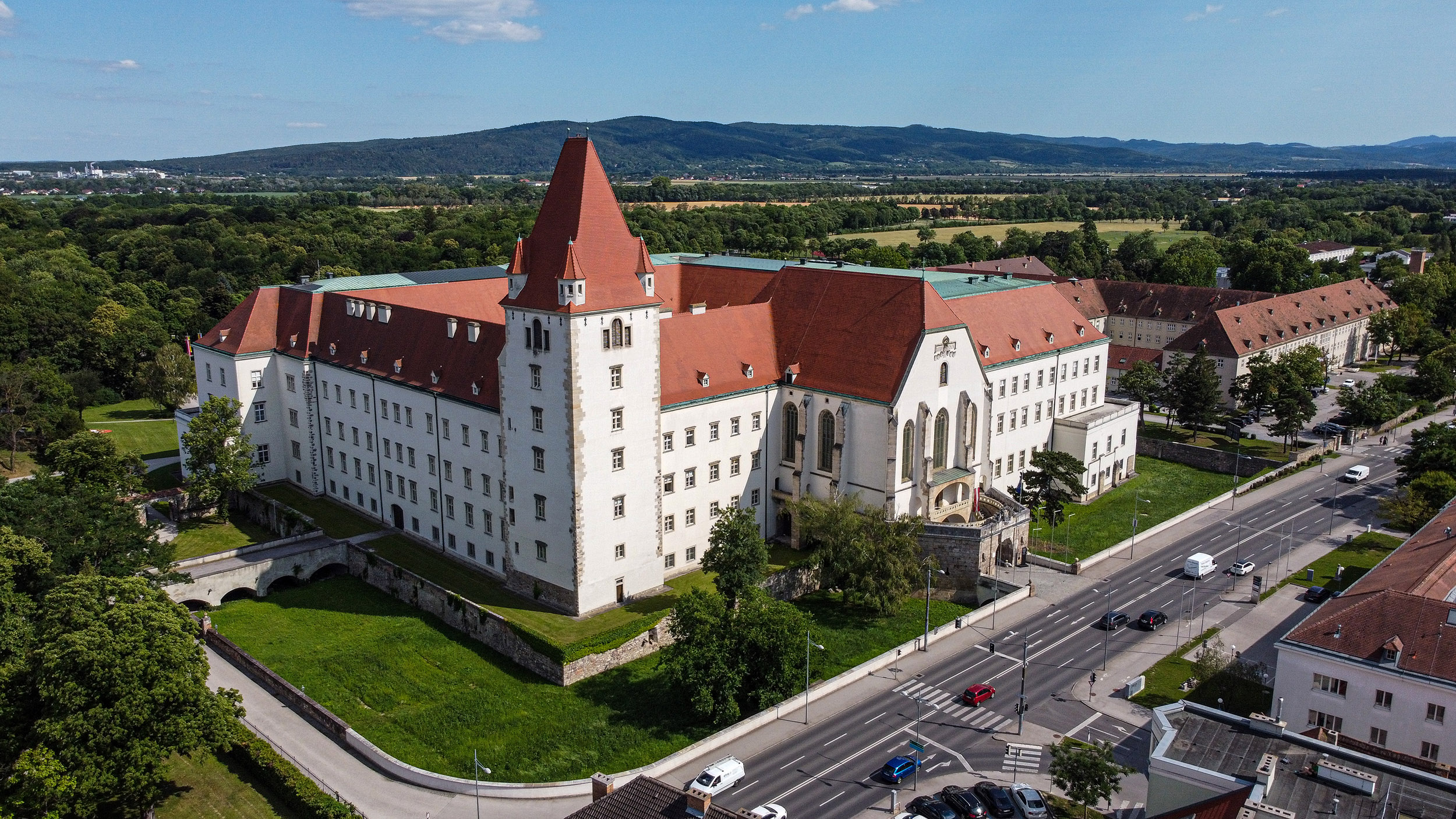
Burg Wiener Neustadt, where Bodó was held captive from 1528 until his death

Thereafter, Bodó was transferred to Esztergom, via Buda, with his sixteen lieutenants, nine captured war flags and spoils of war. Hundreds of nobles petitioned to Ferdinand for the release of Bodó, whose valor and battles against the Ottomans were held in high regard. Bodó, however, refused to swear an oath of allegiance to Ferdinand and remained a steadfast supporter of John Zápolya. After some weeks, Bodó was transferred to the prison at Wiener Neustadt, arriving in the spring of 1528 at the place where he remained a prisoner for the rest of his life. Istvánffy emphasizes that, over the years, he refused to withdraw his oath to Zápolya. The surviving letters of Stephanus Brodericus shed light on Bodó's fate. In June 1535, he conveyed Werbőczy's request to Court Chancellor Tamás Szalaházy to be allowed to send one of his servants to the imprisoned Bodó. In December 1535, Brodericus and Franjo Frankopan informed the king that Ferenc Batthyány and Bishop Miklós Gerendi planned to petition to the court concerning the case of Bodó, but they were astonished that a promissory note is expected of them as "if they were treacherous scoundrels". They were still willing to give the note as it has been set, but they were asking Ferdinand to ease the captivity of Bodó in the meantime, because harsh conditions slowly drive him out of his mind; they argued that even if he was set free he would not be able to either serve or harm anybody.

Ferenc Bodó died in 1537 in Wiener Neustadt, after nine years of captivity. His wife Erzsébet Ráskai first appears as widow in contemporary records in 1540. His wealth was inherited by his children Farkas and Anna (and her husband's family); the extensive Bodó–Ráskai heritage began to be fragmented at this time. His son Farkas, who died prior to 1564, was the last male member of the Bodó de Györgyi family.

== Sources ==
=== Primary sources ===
- Brodericus, Stephanus (2012). Kasza, Péter (ed.). Epistulae [Letters] (in Latin and English). Argumentum Kiadó – National Archives of Hungary. ISBN 978-963-446-660-4.
- Istvánffy, Miklós (2001). Benits, Péter (ed.). Istvánffy Miklós magyarok dolgairól írt históriája I/1 (1–12. könyv) [34 Books of the History of Hungary, Vol. I/1 (1–12)] (in Hungarian). Translated by Tállyai, Pál. Balassi Kiadó. ISBN 963-506-380-6.
- Szerémi, György (1961). Magyarország romlásáról [Memoirs on the Ruin of Hungary] (in Hungarian). Translated by Erdélyi, László; Juhász, László. Magyar Helikon.

=== Secondary sources ===
- Barta, Gábor (1977). "Konszolidációs kísérlet Magyarországon a mohácsi csatavesztés után (Szapolyai János király kormányzása 1526 november–1527 augusztus) [A Consolidation Attempt after the Defeat at Mohács (The Governance of King John Zápolya between November 1526 and August 1527)]". Századok (in Hungarian). 111 (4). Magyar Történelmi Társulat: 635–680. ISSN 0039-8098.
- Botlik, Richárd (2013). "Statileo János diplomáciai küldetései János király (1526–1540) uralkodásának idejéből [The Diplomatic Missions of János Statileo during the Reign of King John (1526–1540)]". Századok (in Hungarian). 147 (4). Magyar Történelmi Társulat: 813–854. ISSN 0039-8098.
- C. Tóth, Norbert; Horváth, Richárd; Neumann, Tibor; Pálosfalvi, Tamás; W. Kovács, András (2017). Magyarország világi archontológiája, 1458–1526, II. Megyék [Secular Archontology of Hungary, 1458–1526, Volume II: Counties] (in Hungarian). MTA Bölcsészettudományi Kutatóközpont Történettudományi Intézete. ISBN 978-963-4160-85-4.
- Csiffáry, Gergely (2004). Petercsák, Tivadar; Veres, Gábor (eds.). "Varkocs Tamás egri várkapitány emlékezete [Tamás Varkocs, Castellan of Eger]". Agria – Az Egri Múzeum Évkönyve – Annales Musei Agriensis (in Hungarian). 40. Dobó István Vármúzeum: 189–260. ISSN 0236-9168.
- Engel, Pál; Lővei, Pál (1983). "Székesfehérvári kőfaragványok Györgyi Bodó Miklós prépost címerével [Stone Carvings from Székesfehérvár bearing the Coat of Arms of Provost Miklós Bodó de Györgyi]". Művészettörténeti Értesítő (in Hungarian). 32 (1): 1–7. ISSN 0027-5247.
- Hegedűs, Attila; Papp, Lajos, eds. (1991). Középkori leveleink (1541-ig) [Medieval Hungarian Letters (until 1541)] (in Hungarian). Tankönyvkiadó. ISBN 963-18-3564-2.
- Kubinyi, András (1984). "A királyi tanács köznemesi ülnökei a Jagelló-korban [The Noble Jurors of the Royal Council in the Jagiellonian Era]". In H. Balázs, Éva; Fügedi, Erik; Maksay, Ferenc (eds.). Mályusz Elemér emlékkönyv. Társadalom- és művelődéstörténeti tanulmányok (in Hungarian). Akadémiai Kiadó. pp. 257–268. ISBN 963-05-3272-7.
- Kubinyi, András (2008). "A Szapolyaiak és familiárisaik (szervitoraik) [The Szapolyais and their Servitors]". Publicationes Universitatis Miskolcinensis, Sectio Philosophica (in Hungarian). 13 (3). Miskolci Egyetem: 227–265. ISSN 1219-5448.
- Prezenszki, Erzsébet (2015). "Bajoni Benedek és Szapolyai János kapcsolata az 1520–30-as években [The Relationship between Benedek Bajoni and János Zapolyai in the 1520s–1530s]". Történeti Tanulmányok. Acta Universitatis Debreceniensis (in Hungarian). 23: 176–194. ISSN 1217-4602.
- Tímár, György (2001). "Mágocs története a Rákóczi szabadságharcig [The History of Mágocs until Rákóczi's War of Independence]". In Füzes, Miklós (ed.). Mágocs 1251–2001 (in Hungarian). Municipality of Mágocs. pp. 49–76. ISBN 963-00-6948-2.
- Tóth, Boglárka (2002). Gaál, Attila (ed.). "A középkori Györgyi és ferences kolostorának azonosítása [Identification of the Medieval Village and the Franciscan Monastery of Györgyi]". A Wosinszky Mór Múzeum Évkönyve (in Hungarian). 24: 133–145. ISSN 0865-5464.
