= Nicholas II Bodó =

Hungarian cleric

Nicholas Bodó
- Provost of Székesfehérvár
- Seal of Nicholas Bodó, 1462
- Installed: 1444
- Term ended: 1474
- Predecessor: Andrew Kálnói
- Successor: Dominic Kálmáncsehi
- Other posts: Provost of Bács; Secret Chancellor chief justice

Personal details
- Died: January/March 1474
- Buried: Székesfehérvár Basilica
- Denomination: Roman Catholic
- Parents: James Bodó
- Education: University of Vienna
- Coat of arms: Nicholas Bodó's coat of arms

Nicholas (II) Bodó de Györgyi (Hungarian: györgyi Bodó (II.) Miklós; died January/March 1474) was a Hungarian cleric in the 15th century, who served as provost of Székesfehérvár from 1444 until his death. He was an influential chancellor during the early reign of King Matthias Corvinus.

== Life and career ==
=== Early career ===
Nicholas (II) Bodó was born into the Bodó de Györgyi noble family, which possessed landholdings in Tolna County and originated from the ancient gens (clan) Szentemágócs. His father was James, who is mentioned only once in 1399. His elder brothers were Gregory, who rose to prominence in the service of John Hunyadi and Nicholas Újlaki in the 1440s, and Andrew, who acted as an envoy of Tolna County in the Diet of 1447. He also had a brother named Dominic, who is mentioned only once in 1446. Despite its ancient origins, the family did not belong to the aristocracy. György Bónis incorrectly ranked them among the elite, claiming that Nicholas and his brothers were raised together with the Hunyadis.

As the youngest brother, Nicholas entered ecclesiastical career. Probably financed by his brother, Gregory, he enrolled at the University of Vienna. In 1432, he was mentioned as a student in the university's faculty of arts. Three years later, in 1435, he was already studying at the faculty of law in Vienna, but he did not obtain an academic degree. Afterwards, he was ordained a priest. Returning Hungary, he joined the court of Nicholas Újlaki. As members of Újlaki's banderium, Nicholas Bodó and his kinship (his brothers and his cousin John) took part in the siege of Máré Castle in 1441, during the civil war between the supporters of Elizabeth of Luxembourg and Władysław III of Poland for the Hungarian throne. Újlaki was one of the staunchest supporters of the latter.

Sometime between 1437 and 1443, Bodó was elected provost of Bács (present-day Bač, Serbia) in the Archdiocese of Kalocsa. On 1 June 1443, the elderly Matthias Gatalóci, Bishop of Veszprém appointed Bodó as his coadjutor bishop. In this capacity, he was styled as gubernator in May 1444. Hungarian historian Pál Engel considered that his appointment to Veszprém came about as a result of Újlaki's influence. Bodó was responsible for the diocese's secular affairs and half of the episcopal income also belonged to him and his brother Gregory. As coadjutor bishop or secular governor, he took control over the episcopal castles of Sümeg and Veszprém. Bodó appears in several charters relating to the diocese's tithe affairs or its estates in Somogy County from late 1443 to the summer of 1444. Bodó was succeeded as coadjutor bishop by Dominic Ötvényi by late 1444.

=== Provost of Székesfehérvár ===
==== Early phase ====
Nicholas Bodó was appointed Provost of Székesfehérvár in early November 1444. Bodó requested Pope Eugene IV to confirm his appointment already in that month. He gained the position, which was one of the most distinguished and wealthiest in Hungary, thanks to Újlaki. The person of Bodó was selected at the royal court of Vladislaus I, weeks before the Battle of Varna, where the monarch was killed. In the aforementioned petition addressed to Pope Eugene, Bodó referred to himself as an appointee of Vladislaus I. He first appears as provost-elect in December 1444. Interestingly, Bodó identified the death of Stephen Basó – his non-immediate predecessor, who died in 1443 – as the reason for his appointment, rather than the appointment of his immediate predecessor, Andrew Kálnói, as Bishop of Pécs. He was referred to as provost-elect until February 1446, when he paid his annate (270 florins) to the Roman Curia. According to Bónis and Engel, a single charter refers to Bodó as Bishop-elect of Syrmia in 1445, but this factual error is based on a misunderstanding of the text. Bodó participated in the national diet of 1447.

In the first phase of his career, Bodó's name appears most frequently in connection with local litigation, for instance, concerning the estates Tolna and Fadd (a long-lasting lawsuit between 1447 and 1455), in addition to conflicts over possessions in Fejér and Somogy counties. Pope Nicholas V appointed him coadjutor bishop beside Matthias Gatalóci in June 1452, upon the request of the elderly and ailing prelate. He held the office until at least August 1455, when Nicholas Újlaki sent him to negotiate with Franciscan friar John of Capistrano, who gathered a crusader army against the invading Ottoman Turks, on the organization of the defense of the southern border. In June 1455, Bodó signed the document in Győr in which the barons swore allegiance to Ladislaus V. The social advancement of Gregory and Nicholas also made it possible to expand their estates around the family seat Györgyi (laid near Mágocs). They acquired the estates Bágyon, Kajmát and Gerenás in Tolna County. Nicholas Bodó also possessed a portion in Sárbogárd in Fejér County.

==== Role in the royal court ====
In February 1459, Nicholas Bodó and his nephew Caspar were among the nobles who took a written oath of allegiance to King Matthias Corvinus, who faced a conspiracy, led by Ladislaus Garai and Nicholas Újlaki, against his rule. Shortly thereafter, Bodó was appointed secret chancellor, replacing Bishop Albert Vetési, who was sent to diplomatic journey to the Italian Peninsula. He is first mentioned in this capacity on 13 March 1459. Sometimes, his office was called as vice-chancellor and thus he functioned as effective head of the royal chancellery. He was member of Matthias' inner council in the next five years. Beside that, Bodó was also made chief justice or personalis, heading the king's court of "personal presence". Bodó simultaneously held his positions of secret chancellor and chief justice until 1464. Numerous records concerning his judicial activity have survived; the majority of these consist of various documents pertaining to legal acts. Because he was a permanent member of the royal retinue, his judicial publications were reviewed by Peter Sári, the head (locumtenens) of the king's court of "special presence", who resided in Buda, in several instances. His protonotary was his familiaris, Gregory Dersanóci at least from 1461. Bodó's name frequently appears in Matthias' diplomatic correspondence. Amidst the Ottoman threat, Bodó, together with his nephew Caspar and deputy Dersanóci, convened an assembly for the Székelys in the autumn of 1462, upon the order of the Hungarian monarch. Bodó's wax seal via his signet ring, which depicts the symbol of the gens Szentemágócs (armored right arm clutching three roses), is preserved from that year. He took part in the negotiations with Emperor Frederick III in Sopron in the summer of 1463, which aimed to recover the Holy Crown of Hungary.

Following his coronation in Székesfehérvár with the Holy Crown in March 1464, Matthias introduced a judicial reform; the courts of "personal presence" and "special presence" were merged under the chief justice, while the two lord and secret chancellors took over the running of the chancellery. With the reform, Bodó lost all his court positions. He was removed from the royal council too, and, unlike other provosts of Székesfehérvár, never rose to a bishopric. Bónis considered that Bodó was an official whom Matthias had inherited from his father; although he survived the reform of 1464, his official career came to an end with the coronation, when the monarch intended to fill the positions with his own confidants. Historian András Kubinyi argued that the king was not satisfied with Bodó's work, and, after the coronation, a group consisting of individuals loyal to the king – who had long known one another well – took over the leadership of the chancellery. After 1464, the collegiate chapter of Székesfehérvár, headed by provost Bodó, also lost some of its significance as place of authentication, while the number of procedures related to the court has increased in the adjacent Knights Hospitaller's convent in Székesfehérvár.

==== Last years ====
Bodó spent the last decade of his life in Székesfehérvár, because he was no longer bound by official duties. In 1464, he bought the estates Vaszar, Almás, Bágyon, Nyires (near present-day Mágocs) and Bikágy (near Kölesd) from the neighboring Macedóniai family. However, at the time of the formal installation, he and his relatives encountered various objections, and they would later engage in a protracted lawsuit over these possessions. In 1469, he reached an agreement with Stephen Simontornyai, preceptor of the Johannites' convent over a boundaries of a forest laid between Tolna and Fadd. In 1470, with the contribution of the provost, the Bodó family acquired the estate Szil from the powerful Rozgonyi family, in exchange for 600 florins and the land Sáros in Esztergom County. Bodó also supported his nephew Matthias and other relatives (Nicholas (III) and Stephen) to obtain benefices in the chapter of Székesfehérvár. He constructed an own chapel within the Basilica of the Assumption of the Blessed Virgin Mary. Pope Sixtus IV appointed him rector of Saint Magdalene, Mary of Egypt and Saint Afra chapel within the basilica in 1472, which is the same as the chapel founded by him. Bodó donated his own house and three estates belonging to the cathedral chapter to the chapel prior to 1470. Nicholas Bodó died sometime between 10 January and 30 March 1474.

Three stone carvings were preserved, one of them with his coat-of-arms, all were once parts of a tympanum with relief and blind tracery (present-day, they are parts of the lapidarium of the Hungarian National Museum). Two fragments of his red marble grave slab were also discovered; the epithet "emagocz / • ppositus • ecclie • a{\b)en•" refers to Bodó's clan-based lineage – a formula that was already unusual by the second half of the 15th century – which, thus, simultaneously indicates the relatively low social status of the Bodó family.

== Sources ==
- Bónis, György (1971). A jogtudó értelmiség a Mohács előtti Magyarországon [Hungarian intelligentsia having legal expertise in the period before the battle of Mohács] (in Hungarian). Akadémiai Kiadó.
- C. Tóth, Norbert; Horváth, Richárd; Neumann, Tibor; Pálosfalvi, Tamás (2016). Magyarország világi archontológiája, 1458–1526, I. Főpapok és bárók [Secular Archontology of Hungary, 1458–1526, Volume I: Prelates and Barons] (in Hungarian). MTA Bölcsészettudományi Kutatóközpont Történettudományi Intézete. ISBN 978-963-4160-35-9.
- C. Tóth, Norbert (2019). A kalocsa-bácsi főegyházmegye káptalanjainak középkori archontológiája [Medieval Archontology of the Chapters of the Archdiocese of Kalocsa–Bács] (in Hungarian). Kalocsai Főegyházmegyei Levéltár. ISBN 978-615-5940-01-9.
- Engel, Pál; Lővei, Pál (1983). "Székesfehérvári kőfaragványok Györgyi Bodó Miklós prépost címerével [Stone Carvings from Székesfehérvár bearing the Coat of Arms of Provost Miklós Bodó de Györgyi]". Művészettörténeti Értesítő (in Hungarian). 32 (1): 1–7. ISSN 0027-5247.
- Engel, Pál (1996). Magyarország világi archontológiája, 1301–1457, I [Secular Archontology of Hungary, 1301–1457, Volume I] (in Hungarian). História, MTA Történettudományi Intézete. ISBN 963-8312-44-0.
- Köblös, József (1994). Az egyházi középréteg Mátyás és a Jagellók korában [The Middle Layer of Churchmen in the Age of Matthias and the Jagiellonian Kings] (in Hungarian). Társadalom- és művelődéstörténeti tanulmányok 12., MTA Történettudományi Intézete. ISBN 963-8312-18-1.
- Markó, László (2006). A magyar állam főméltóságai Szent Istvántól napjainkig: Életrajzi Lexikon [Great Officers of State in Hungary from King Saint Stephen to Our Days: A Biographical Encyclopedia] (in Hungarian). Helikon Kiadó. ISBN 963-208-970-7.
- Ribi, András (2018). "A fehérvári káptalan archontológiája (1301–1457) [The Archontology of the Székesfehérvár Chapter (1301–1457)]". Turul (in Hungarian). 91 (4). Magyar Heraldikai és Genealógiai Társaság: 132–154. ISSN 1216-7258.
- Ribi, András (2024). "Az utolsó Fehérvárra temetett prépost. Adalékok Györgyi Bodó Miklós (†1474) életrajzához [The last provost buried in Székesfehérvár. Contributions to the biography of Miklós Györgyi Bodó (†1474)]". Ars Hungarica (in Hungarian). 50 (4): 369–382. ISSN 0133-1531.

Nicholas II House of Bodó Born: ? Died: January/March 1474
Catholic Church titles
Preceded by Thomas Szatmári	Provost of Bács; 1443–1444	Succeeded by Sigismund Garai
Preceded by Andrew Kálnói	Provost of Székesfehérvár; 1444–1474	Succeeded by Dominic Kálmáncsehi
Political offices
Preceded by Albert Vetési	Secret Chancellor; 1459–1464	Succeeded by Stephen Várdai & John Vitéz
Preceded by Albert Vetési	Chief justice 1459–1464	Succeeded by Albert Hangácsi
