= Gregory Bodó =

Hungarian master of the treasury, 1458–1459

- Seal of Gregory Bodó, 1445

Master of the treasury
- Reign: 1458–1459
- Predecessor: John Perényi
- Successor: John Rozgonyi
- Died: May/August 1459
- Noble family: House of Bodó
- Issue: Caspar; Roland; Nicholas III (?)
- Father: James Bodó

Gregory Bodó de Györgyi (Hungarian: györgyi Bodó Gergely; died May/August 1459) was a Hungarian nobleman in the 15th century, who served as Master of the treasury from 1458 to 1459. He rose socially as a confidant of the powerful baron Nicholas Újlaki, rising from a status of lesser noble to become a magnate by the end of his life.

== Early life ==
Gregory Bodó was born into the Bodó de Györgyi noble family, which possessed landholdings in Tolna County and originated from the ancient gens (clan) Szentemágócs. His father was James, who is mentioned only once in 1399. His younger brothers were Andrew, who acted as an envoy of Tolna County in the Diet of 1447, Nicholas (II), who served as provost of Székesfehérvár between 1444 and 1474, and Dominic, who is mentioned only once in 1446. Nicholas attended the University of Vienna, probably financed by Gregory. Despite its ancient origins, the family did not belong to the aristocracy. György Bónis incorrectly ranked them among the elite, claiming that Gregory and his brothers were raised together with the Hunyadis.

Bodó entered court service during the reign of Sigismund. He acted as royal bailiff in 1424, when, also as a neighboring landowner, he took part in the induction of the heirs of the late Nicholas Treutel. He was mentioned among the nobles of Tolna County in 1432, who took part in the investigation process of an act of domination committed by Peter Závodi against the Knights Hospitaller estate Varasd.

== Career ==
By the early 1440s, Bodó entered the service of Nicholas Újlaki, one of the richest and most powerful barons of the Kingdom of Hungary at that time. His social rise is due to the civil war between the supporters of Elizabeth of Luxembourg and Władysław III of Poland for the Hungarian throne, in which Újlaki, alongside John Hunyadi, committed himself to supporting the latter. Gregory Bodó and his kinship (his brothers and his cousin John) took part in the siege of Máré Castle, which was the possession of Ladislaus Töttös, Elizabeth's supporter during the conflict in 1441. In the interest of reconciliation, Władysław strongly opposed this plan and forbade the Bodó family and their allies (including Nicholas Antimus de Tapsony, the lord of Szigetvár) from continuing the siege. By 1443, Bodó was a trusted confidant of Nicholas Újlaki; he acted as a relator in his charter in that year. Still in 1443, Bodó was among those, who were entrusted with the collection of the chamber's profit (Latin: lucrum camerae) in Tolna County, which area then belonged to Újlaki's dominion. The civil war resulted the victory of Władysław's party and the political rise of Hunyadi and Újlaki, which opened up new opportunities for Bodó as well. When his brother Nicholas Bodó was made coadjutor bishop in the Diocese of Veszprém in 1443, he was responsible for the diocese's secular affairs and half of the episcopal income also belonged to him and his brother Gregory. Vladislaus I granted the right of coinage to bishop Matthias Gatalóci and Gregory Bodó in that year, the proceeds from which they had to use for the defense of Veszprém Castle.

Under Újlaki, Bodó served as Vice-voivode of Transylvania between 1444 and 1446. Bodó participated in that diet held in Buda on 15 April 1444, where Vladislaus I – in the presence of papal legate Julian Cesarini – swore to renew the war against the Ottomans in the coming summer. Three days later, Bodó was among the more than two hundred nobles who confirmed Vladislaus' decree. His seal, which depicts the symbol of the gens Szentemágócs (armored right arm clutching three roses), is preserved from 1445. He functioned as vice-ispán of Tolna County from 1446 to 1447, administering the county on behalf of Újlaki. He was one of the envoys sent to Vienna to negotiate with Frederick III concerning the status of the infant king Ladislaus V in March 1446. Thereafter, Újlaki sent him to the Hungarian capital in order to serve his ally John Hunyadi, Regent of Hungary. In this capacity, he was one of the castellans of Buda from 1451 to 1455. He was present in the Diet of Vienna in late 1452, where Hunyadi renounced the regency and King Ladislaus' trip to Hungary was prepared. Hunyadi sent Bodó to Pressburg (present-day Bratislava, Slovakia) to announce the joyful event. He acted as a relator for Hunyadi in 1455. During his service, his son Caspar also became a member of the royal household; he was mentioned as a courtly knight in 1454.

For Bodó, social advancement also made it possible to expand his estates in Tolna County. The family seat was the village (later market town) Györgyi (laid near Mágocs). He and his family also possessed the surrounding Máré, Podach and Anya (or Janya) along the river Sárvíz (near present-day Sióagárd). In 1445, together with his brother Nicholas, Gregory Bodó entered into a pledge agreement valued at 400 florins regarding the estate Szil in Tolna County with John Rozgonyi. Due to the modification of the agreement, a legal dispute lasting decades subsequently arose between the two families. Gregory and Nicholas acquired the lands Bágyon, Kajmát and Gerenás (all laid around their seat Mágocs and Györgyi) in Tolna County. Under Hunyadi's service, Gregory Bodó acquired further possessions in other parts of the kingdom; he bought the village Szokolya with its custom in Nógrád County from Ladislaus Cseh de Léva in June 1453. Formerly, Bodó lent him 1,200 florins to redeem his mortgaged estates. Shortly after, he took the estates Fegyvernek in Hont County and Nagysáró in Bars County along the river Garam (present-day Zbrojníky and Šarovce in Slovakia, respectively) as a pledge, accessories of the castle of Léva, from the Cseh de Léva family in November 1453. For his loyalty and service, King Ladislaus V donated the villages Gyömrő and Gomba in Pest County to Bodó in April 1454. Taking advantage of the chaotic situation, Gregory and his brother Dominic seized the estate Dada (near Igal) in Somogy County from Margaret Dadai sometime prior to 1446. In that year, in accordance with the resolution of the diet at Székesfehérvár, Margaret's husband, Nicholas Baki called upon the brothers to return the estate.

Records have also survived regarding his activities as a patron. In 1452, he commissioned two altarpieces from Nicolaus Teginger, a painter from Pressburg, who, however, fell behind schedule. Two urgent letters from Bodó regarding the matter have survived in the municipal archives. Bodó specified the visual representations in detail. He had paid the painter advancing the amount from the town's thirtieth. It is plausible that he intended the paintings for the church under construction in Györgyi. Upon his request through Voivode John Rozgonyi, Pope Callixtus III granted the privilege of indulgence to the St. Gregory parish church in Györgyi that was in need of renovation in 1455. He founded and erected a monastery for the Order of Friars Minor next to the church prior to 1459. He handed over the aforementioned St. Gregory church to the Franciscan friars. He built another church in Györgyi prior to 1459, dedicated to St. Nicholas, which became the new parish church of the settlement. Upon his own request, in 1459, Pope Pius II granted indulgences to the new church, which Bodó endowed with donations and where eight priests served (in that era, this was an outstanding figure), and to the St. Gregory monastery of the Order of Friars Minor. In order to finance the monastery, Bodó established a financial foundation which was confirmed by Pope Pius in 1460, after his death.

Following the death of John Hunyadi in 1456, Gregory Bodó returned to the service of Nicholas Újlaki. Under his rule, he served as (vice)-ispán of Tolna County from the spring of 1458 to his death in 1459. Beside that, the new monarch Matthias Corvinus (son of Hunyadi) appointed him Master of the treasury in July 1458, during a national diet convoked to Buda. Thus, Bodó became one of the barons of the realm. At the peak of his career, he died around May 1459. His elder son Caspar succeeded him as ispán and became head of the family. His another son was Roland, whose name, however, appears in local legal cases only. It is possible that the cleric Nicholas (III) was also his son.

== Sources ==
- C. Tóth, Norbert; Horváth, Richárd; Neumann, Tibor; Pálosfalvi, Tamás (2016). Magyarország világi archontológiája, 1458–1526, I. Főpapok és bárók [Secular Archontology of Hungary, 1458–1526, Volume I: Prelates and Barons] (in Hungarian). MTA Bölcsészettudományi Kutatóközpont Történettudományi Intézete. ISBN 978-963-4160-35-9.
- C. Tóth, Norbert; Horváth, Richárd; Neumann, Tibor; Pálosfalvi, Tamás; W. Kovács, András (2017). Magyarország világi archontológiája, 1458–1526, II. Megyék [Secular Archontology of Hungary, 1458–1526, Volume II: Counties] (in Hungarian). MTA Bölcsészettudományi Kutatóközpont Történettudományi Intézete. ISBN 978-963-4160-85-4.
- Engel, Pál; Lővei, Pál (1983). "Székesfehérvári kőfaragványok Györgyi Bodó Miklós prépost címerével [Stone Carvings from Székesfehérvár bearing the Coat of Arms of Provost Miklós Bodó de Györgyi]". Művészettörténeti Értesítő (in Hungarian). 32 (1): 1–7. ISSN 0027-5247.
- Engel, Pál (1996). Magyarország világi archontológiája, 1301–1457, I. [Secular Archontology of Hungary, 1301–1457, Volume I] (in Hungarian). História, MTA Történettudományi Intézete. ISBN 963-8312-44-0.
- Markó, László (2006). A magyar állam főméltóságai Szent Istvántól napjainkig: Életrajzi Lexikon [Great Officers of State in Hungary from King Saint Stephen to Our Days: A Biographical Encyclopedia] (in Hungarian). Helikon Kiadó. ISBN 963-208-970-7.
- Ribi, András (2024). "Az utolsó Fehérvárra temetett prépost. Adalékok Györgyi Bodó Miklós (†1474) életrajzához [The last provost buried in Székesfehérvár. Contributions to the biography of Miklós Györgyi Bodó (†1474)]". Ars Hungarica (in Hungarian). 50 (4): 369–382. ISSN 0133-1531.
- Tímár, György (2001). "Mágocs története a Rákóczi szabadságharcig [The History of Mágocs until Rákóczi's War of Independence]". In Füzes, Miklós (ed.). Mágocs 1251–2001 (in Hungarian). Municipality of Mágocs. pp. 49–76. ISBN 963-00-6948-2.
- Tóth, Boglárka (2002). Gaál, Attila (ed.). "A középkori Györgyi és ferences kolostorának azonosítása [Identification of the Medieval Village and the Franciscan Monastery of Györgyi]". A Wosinszky Mór Múzeum Évkönyve (in Hungarian). 24: 133–145. ISSN 0865-5464.

Gregory House of Bodó Born: ? Died: May/August 1459
Political offices
Preceded by Ladislaus Buzlai	Vice-voivode of Transylvania; 1444–1446	Succeeded by Mark Herepei
Preceded by John Perényi	Master of the treasury 1458–1459	Succeeded by John Rozgonyi
