= Nicholas III Bodó =

Hungarian cleric

Nicholas Bodó
- Archdeacon of Tolna
- Installed: 1495
- Term ended: 1496
- Other posts: Provost of Marót; Guardian of Pécs

Personal details
- Died: after 1503
- Denomination: Roman Catholic
- Parents: Gregory Bodó (?)
- Education: University of Bologna
- Coat of arms: Nicholas Bodó's coat of arms

Nicholas (III) Bodó de Györgyi (Hungarian: györgyi Bodó (III.) Miklós; died after 1503) was a Hungarian cleric and doctor of canon law at the turn of the 15th and 16th centuries.

== Family and studies ==
Nicholas (III) was born into the Bodó de Györgyi noble family, originating from the gens Szentemágócs, which possessed landholdings in Tolna and Baranya counties. His parentage is uncertain, but it is most likely that his father was Gregory, through whose activities the family rose both politically and socially. In this case, his brothers were Caspar and Roland.

His studies and ecclesiastical career were paved by his uncle Nicholas (II), who was the provost of Székesfehérvár from 1444 to 1474. The young Nicholas (III) began his legal studies at the University of Bologna at least in 1469. There, he is mentioned as rector of the ultramontanes (i.e. foreign students) in August 1472. He also taught the Decretals in Bologna at the same time. He obtained a doctorate in canon law, although there is no record of this.

== Ecclesiastical career ==
Returning Hungary, Bodó became a canon of the collegiate chapter of Székesfehérvár, where his namesake uncle served as provost. He is mentioned in this capacity in 1482, when acted as a representative of the chapter during a litigation process. Before 1493, he granted benefices in the Archdiocese of Kalocsa and the Diocese of Syrmia; in that year, he held the positions of the lector and cantor of the cathedral chapter of Kő, as well as cantor of the cathedral chapter of Bács (today Bač, Serbia), simultaneously. He also served as provost of Marót (present-day Morović, Serbia). In that year, his superiors, Peter Váradi, the Archbishop of Kalocsa, and Stephen Fodor, the Bishop of Syrmia deprived him of his benefices, according to a letter of Pope Alexander VI. It is conceivable that this happened because the requirement to reside there was not met in either case.

Bodó was provost of Marót until 1495. He gained the office from the Maróti family, the founders of the provostry dedicated to Virgin Mary, still during the reign of Matthias Corvinus (died 1490). The provostry was in a very poor state and in a dire financial situation, having suffered from constant incursions by the Turks; consequently, its annual income amounted to no more than 24 gold florins. Prior to 1495, Sigismund Ernuszt, the Bishop of Pécs petitioned Pope Alexander VI to allow the provostry of Marót, which had located in Syrmia County within the territory of the Diocese of Pécs, to be permanently united with the episcopal estates of Pécs. Bodó was willing to resign from his position in exchange for appropriate compensation; as a result, with the pope's approval, he was made archdeacon of Tolna and a canon of the cathedral chapter of Pécs by March 1495. He was delegated as papal judge by the Roman Curia concerning an appeal case in the Diocese of Zagreb, alongside canon Grgur Frankopan and episcopal vicar Albert in 1496. He became custos (guardian) of Pécs by 1503.

== Sources ==
- C. Tóth, Norbert (2019). A kalocsa-bácsi főegyházmegye káptalanjainak középkori archontológiája [Medieval Archontology of the Chapters of the Archdiocese of Kalocsa–Bács] (in Hungarian). Kalocsai Főegyházmegyei Levéltár. ISBN 978-615-5940-01-9.
- Fedeles, Tamás (1994). A pécsi székeskáptalan személyi összetétele a késő középkorban (1354–1526) [The Personnel of the Pécs Cathedral Chapter in the Later Middle Ages 1354–1526] (in Hungarian). Tanulmányok Pécs történetéből 17., Pécs Története Alapítvány. ISSN 1219-4077.
- Haraszti Szabó, Péter; Kelényi, Borbála (2019). Magyarországi diákok francia, angol, itáliai és német egyetemeken a középkorban, 1100–1526 [Students from Hungary at the Universities of France, England, Italy and Germany in the Middle Ages 1100–1526] (in Hungarian). ELTE Egyetemi Könyvtár és Levéltár; MTA ELTE Egyetemtörténeti Kutatócsoport. ISBN 978-963-489-098-0.
- Köblös, József (1994). Az egyházi középréteg Mátyás és a Jagellók korában [The Middle Layer of Churchmen in the Age of Matthias and the Jagiellonian Kings] (in Hungarian). Társadalom- és művelődéstörténeti tanulmányok 12., MTA Történettudományi Intézete. ISBN 963-8312-18-1.
