= Somogyszil =

Somogyszil Sil (in German)
- Village
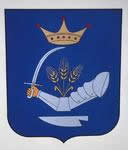
- Coat of arms

- Location of Somogy county in Hungary

- Location of Somogyszil
- Coordinates: 46.51538°N 17.99988°E
- Country: Hungary
- Region: Southern Transdanubia
- County: Somogy
- District: Kaposvár
- RC Diocese: Kaposvár

Government
  - Mayor: Ferenc Sámoly

Area
  - Total: 38.46 km^{2} (14.85 sq mi)

Population (2017)
  - Total: 728
  - Density: 18.9/km^{2} (49.0/sq mi)
- Demonym(s): szili, somogyszili
- Time zone: UTC+1 (CET)
  - Summer (DST): UTC+2 (CEST)
- Postal code: 7276
- Area code: (+36) 82
- NUTS 3 code: HU232
- MP: Mihály Witzmann (Fidesz)
- Website: Somogyszil Online

Somogyszil (German: Sil) is a village in Somogy county, Hungary.

== Etymology ==
It was first mentioned in 1138 as Scilu in Dömös Chapter's land donation letter. Its meaning is covered with elm. In 1864 its name got conjunct with Somogy to distinguish it from other settlements.

== Geography ==
It lies south of the River Koppány, near to Igal, 22 km from Kaposvár.

== History ==
Its name appeared in 1329 in an official decree, then between 1332 and 1337 in the papal registration of tithe. In the 15th century it became a market town. From 1551 for 150 years Szil was a part of the Sanjak of Törökkoppány. During the war of Christian reoccupation its citizens became Hajdús which meant a certain freedom.

In the Habsburg administration Somogyszil came from Tolna County under the control of Somogy County in 1696, after the Turkish occupation thanks to a decree of Pál Esterházy.

German settlers arrived in the at that time - due to the Ottoman rule - deserted settlement in the beginning of the 18th century. Somogyszil experienced a strong economic development and regained its sealing right. In 1891 it had 2672 mostly German and Hungarian residents.

== Coat of arms ==
Standing truncated shield. In its blue field armored arm to the right holding a silver saber. Above his elbow stands three gold wheatear on the shield line, the two on the edge are decorated with one gold leaf. The armored arm is framed by a triangular gold crown decorated with red jewels on the top and by a silver ploughshare turning to the right on the bottom. The crown refers to the former market town right of the settlement, the armored arm refers to the former Hajdú settlement.

== Main sights ==
- Roman Catholic Church (built in Gothic style in the Middle Ages, rebuilt in Baroque style in 1726)

== Notable residents ==
- Illés Károly Edvi (1842–1919), Hungarian jurist
- Mór Szegfi (1825–1896), Hungarian journalist, state secretary
- Gyula Hajdu (1886–1973), Hungarian jurist
- József Kelemen (1939–2007), Hungarian industrial designer

== Literature ==
- Fülöp Márta : Múlt, jelen és jövendő a József-hegy alatt - Somogyszil monográfiája
