= Zbrojníky =

Zbrojníky Kétfegyvernek
- Municipality
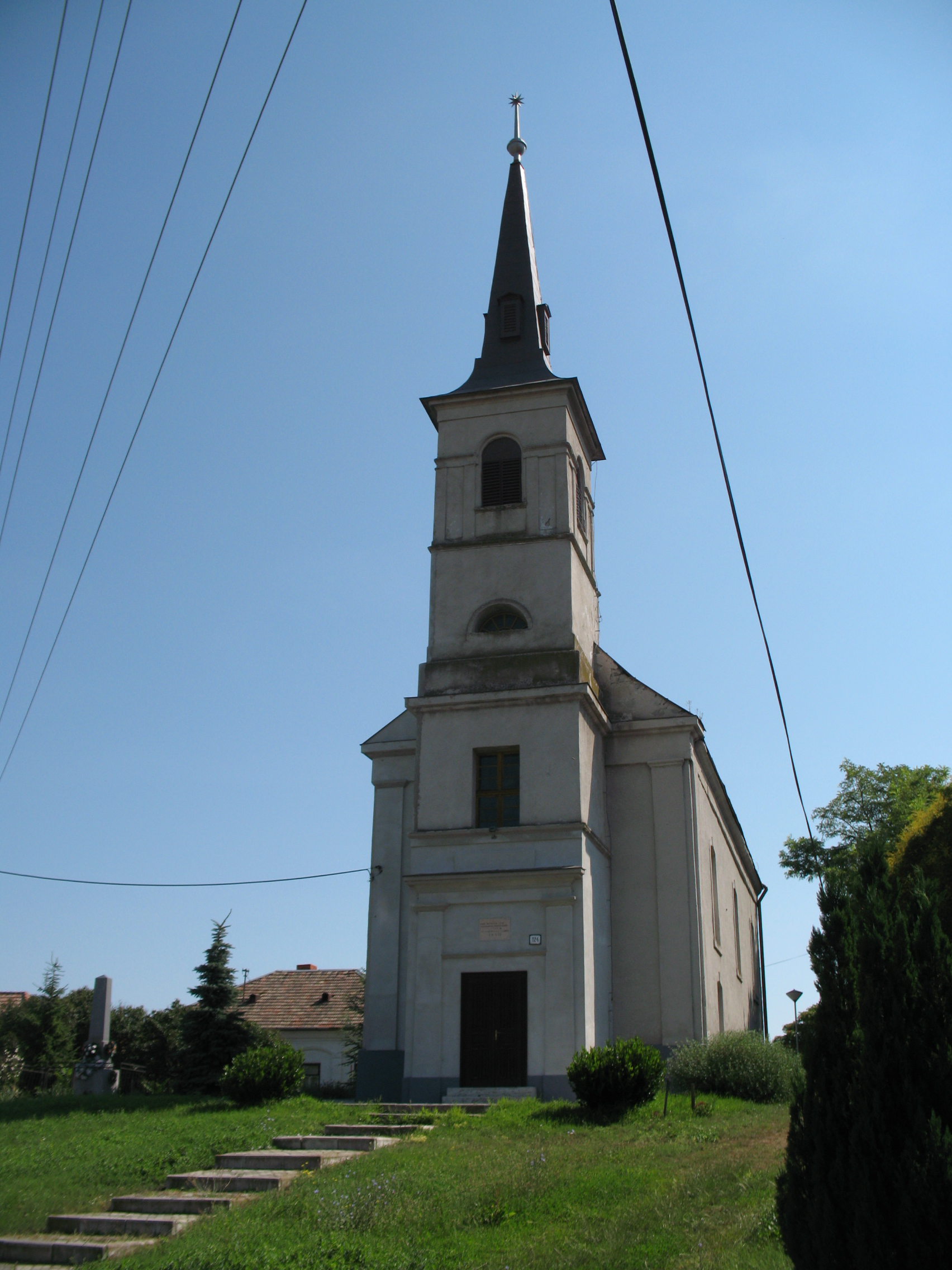
- Reformed church in Zbrojníky

- Flag

- Location of Zbrojníky in the Nitra Region Location of Zbrojníky in Slovakia
- Coordinates: 48.12°N 18.70°E
- Country: Slovakia
- Region: Nitra Region
- District: Levice District
- First mentioned: 1303

Area
  - Total: 16.36 km^{2} (6.32 sq mi)
- Elevation: 177 m (581 ft)

Population (2025)
  - Total: 487
- Time zone: UTC+1 (CET)
  - Summer (DST): UTC+2 (CEST)
- Postal code: 935 55
- Area code: +421 36
- Vehicle registration plate (until 2022): LV
- Website: www.zbrojniky.sk

Zbrojníky (Hungarian: Kétfegyvernek) is a village and municipality in the Levice District in the Nitra Region of Slovakia.

== History ==
In historical records the village was first mentioned in 1303.

== Geography ==
The municipality lies at an altitude of 177 metres (581 ft) and covers an area of 16.36 km^{2} (6.32 sq mi) (2025).

== Population ==
Population statistic (10 years)
Year	1995	2005	2015	2025
Count	534	504	495	487
Difference		−5.61%	−1.78%	−1.61%

Population statistic
Year	2024	2025
Count	488	487
Difference		−0.20%

It has a population of 487 people (31 December 2025).

=== Ethnicity ===
Census 2021 (1+ %)
Ethnicity	Number	Fraction
Slovak	372	74.69%
Hungarian	137	27.51%
Not found out	22	4.41%
Total	498	

In year 2021 was 498 people by ethnicity 372 as Slovak, 137 as Hungarian, 22 as Not found out, 2 as Russian, 1 as Czech and 1 as Romani.

Note on population: The difference values of population numbers in the table "Population statistic" and in the sections "Ethnicity" & "Religion" is caused by the use of various statistical methods.

=== Religion ===
Census 2021 (1+ %)
Religion	Number	Fraction
Roman Catholic Church	241	48.39%
None	89	17.87%
Evangelical Church	88	17.67%
Calvinist Church	47	9.44%
Not found out	26	5.22%
Greek Catholic Church	5	1%
Total	498	

In year 2021 was 498 people by religion 241 from Roman Catholic Church, 89 from None, 88 from Evangelical Church, 47 from Calvinist Church, 26 from Not found out, 5 from Greek Catholic Church, 1 from Other and not ascertained christian church and 1 from Ad hoc movements.

== Facilities ==
The village has a public library and football pitch.

== Notable people ==
- Lajos Evva (1851–1912), Hungarian theater director, writer, and translator.
