= Mesztegnyő =

- Village
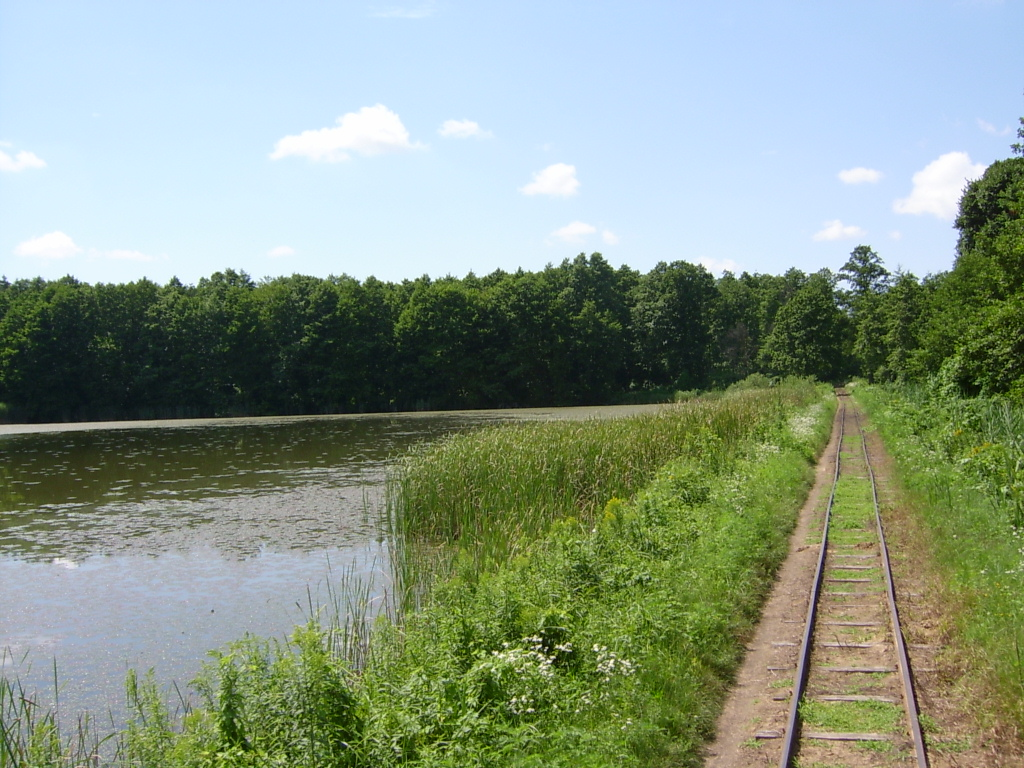
- Fish pond next to the railway

- Coat of arms

- Location of Somogy county in Hungary

- Location of Mesztegnyő
- Coordinates: 46.49821°N 17.42526°E
- Country: Hungary
- Region: Southern Transdanubia
- County: Somogy
- District: Marcali
- RC Diocese: Kaposvár

Area
  - Total: 44.71 km^{2} (17.26 sq mi)

Population (2017)
  - Total: 1,349
  - Density: 30.17/km^{2} (78.15/sq mi)
- Demonym: mesztegnyői
- Time zone: UTC+1 (CET)
  - Summer (DST): UTC+2 (CEST)
- Postal code: 8716
- Area code: (+36) 85
- NUTS 3 code: HU232
- MP: József Attila Móring (KDNP)
- Website: Mesztegnyő Online

Mesztegnyő is a village in Somogy county, Hungary.
