= György Bónis =

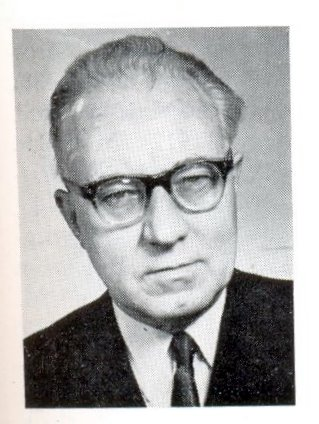
György Bónis (c. 1960)

György Bónis (January 5, 1914 – 1985) was a Hungarian jurist, researcher of Hungarian and European legal history.

György Bónis was born in Budapest, Hungary. His family name is probably of Italian or French origin. He completed his secondary education in Budapest, where he distinguished himself by winning 2 school award. He received his doctorate in jurisprudence in 1935 at the Pázmány Péter University. After receiving his doctoral degree, he spent a year in Great Britain, attending the lectures of Prof. Holdsworth and Plucknett. In the fall of 1940 he was appointed as a professor in the field of "the history of Hungarian law" at the University of Kolozsvár (now Cluj-Napoca, in Romania). From the beginning of 1940 through 1947 he regularly held lectures in this field of specialization as well as in other program areas. In 1947 all his goods have been confiscated, and he was constrained to leave Romania by the Romanian communist authorities. In 1947 became ordinary professor of Hungarian and European legal history at the University of Szeged. His scholarly activities in Hungary resulted in the publication of nearly 300 studies and articles, including many of his own books and textbooks, scholarly studies and essays, and hundreds of periodical articles. In Hungary, his early works focused on penal law, and later his research activity led him to deal with the history of European ius commune in Hungary. In 1964 he published his comprehensive volume entitled Einflüsse des römischen Rechts in Ungarn. He was visiting professor at the University of Cambridge, and member of the European Academy of History.

== Major works ==
- Einflüsse des römischen Rechts in Ungarn, Ius Romanum Medii Aevi V. 10., Milano, 1964
- The laws of the medieval kingdom of Hungary written by György Bónis in collab. with Leslie S. Domonkos. - Idyllwild: Charles Schlacks, jr., 1999-.
- Un libro di testo ungherese di diritto romano del cinquecento, in Studi in onore di E. Volterra, Milano 1971, vol. VI, 343
- La pénétration du droit romain dans les pays slaves et hongrois, in Recueils de la Société Jean Bodin pour l’histoire comparative des institutions, Bruxelles 1967, 77-86
- Bónis György: "Les autorités de 'foi publique' et les archives des 'loci credibiles' en Hongrie," Archivum 12 (1962): 97-104.
- Dőry Ferenc–Bónis György– Bácskai Vera, szerk. Decreta regni Hungariae. Gesetze und Verordnungen Ungarns 1301–1457. Budapest: Akadémiai Kiadó, 1976
- Buda és Pest bírósági gyakorlata a török kiűzése után, 1686–1708 (Bp., 1962),
- Középkori jogunk elemei. Római jog. Kánonjog. Szokásjog (Bp., 1972).
- A jogtudó értelmiség a középkori Nyugat- és Közép-Európában Kiadás: Budapest, 1972
- Hűbériség és rendiség a középkori magyar jogban (Kolozsvár, é.n. [1947.] ill. Osiris Kiadó, Bp. 2003.)
- A rendi képviselettől a népképviseletig (In: Emlékkönyv Csizmadia Andor hetvenedik születésnapjára, JPTE, Pécs, 1980.)
- A magyar büntetőtörvénykönyv első javaslata 1712-ben (Az Angyal szeminárium kiadványai 26. Bp. 1934.)
- Les suretés personnelles en Hongrie du 13e au 18e siècle, in Les suretés personnelles. Moyen Âge et temps modernes. (Recueils de la Société Jean Bodin pour l’histoire comparative des institutions, Tome XXIX) Bruxelles 1971, 725-766
- Hungarian Feudal Diet (13th-18th Centuries). (Recueils de la Société Jean Bodin 25 1965.)
- The Powers of Deputies in the Hungarian Feudal Diet, 1790-1848.(In: Liber memorialis Sir Maurice Powicke, Dublin, 1963. Louvain - Paris, 1965. Čtudes présentées ŕ la Commission internationale pour l' histoire des Assemblées d' états et duparlamentarisme 27. 87-307. oldal)
- Ein neuer Plan zur Erforschung der alten ungarischen Repräsentativforschung. (In: Liber memorialis Heinrich Sproemberg, Rostock, 1966. Wissenschaftliche Zeitschrift der Universität 17. 1968. Gesellschaft- und Sprchwissenschaftliche Reihe, Heft 1. Herausgeber: der Rektor. Études présentées á la Commission internationale pour l' histoire des Assemblées d'états et du parliamentarisme 36.)
- Die ungarische Stände in der ersten Hälfte des 18. Jahrhunderts. (In: Dietrich Gerhard (szerk.): Ständische Vertretungen in Europa im 17. Und 18. Jahrundert. Göttingen, 1969. Veröffentlichungen de Max-Planck-Instituts für Geschichte 17.; Études présentées á la Commission internationale pour l'histoire des Assemblées d'états et du parliamentarisme 37)

== Bibliografia ==
- In memoriam György Bónis, in Parliaments, Estates and Representation 6, 1986. p. 211
- In memoriam György Bónis, in Zeitschrift der Savigny Stiftung für Rechtsgeschichte Germanistische Abteilung, 1987. pp. 487–499
