= Stephen Várdai =

Hungarian Roman Catholic bishop and cardinal

His Eminence Stephen Várdai
- Cardinal Archbishop of Kalocsa
- Archdiocese: Kalocsa
- See: Kalocsa
- Installed: 25 February 1457
- Term ended: 22 February 1471
- Predecessor: Raphael Herceg
- Successor: Gabriel Matucsinai
- Other post: Cardinal-priest of Santi Nereo ed Achilleo
- Previous post: Vice-Chancellor of the Kingdom of Hungary (1456-1458)

Orders
- Created cardinal: 18 September 1467 (created in pectore); 19 September 1467 (published) by Pope Paul II
- Rank: Cardinal-priest

Personal details
- Born: 1425? Szabolcs County, Kingdom of Hungary
- Died: 22 February 1471 (aged 46) Kalocsa, Kingdom of Hungary
- Denomination: Roman Catholic
- Profession: Doctor of Canon Law
- Education: University of Ferrara

Stephen Várdai (Hungarian: Várdai István; died 22 February 1471) was a Hungarian Roman Catholic bishop and cardinal.

== Biography ==
Stephen Várdai was born in Szabolcs County, Kingdom of Hungary, ca. 1425, the son of nobleman Pelbartus Várdai. He studied at the University of Ferrara, receiving a doctorate in canon law.

In his early life, Várdai joined the military to fight against the Ottoman Empire. He later joined the ecclesiastical estate. He was a canon of the cathedral chapter of Eger from 1451 to 1454. He spent 1454 to 1456 in the Voivodeship of Transylvania. In 1456, he returned to Eger in 1456 as provost of the cathedral chapter. He became Vice-Chancellor of the Kingdom of Hungary in 1456, holding this post until 1458.

In 1457, he was elected Archbishop of Kalocsa, with Pope Callixtus III confirming his appointment on February 23, 1457.

Shortly thereafter, he was sent to the Kingdom of France to negotiate a marriage between Ladislaus the Posthumous and a daughter of Charles VII of France. This embassy was frustrated by the Hungarian king's death later in 1457. In 1464, the new king, Matthias Corvinus made Várdai Chancellor of the Kingdom of Hungary, a position he held until 1471.

At the request of Matthias Corvinus and Louis XI of France, Pope Paul II made Várdai a cardinal priest in the consistory of September 18, 1467; his appointment was published in San Marco, Rome the next day. He received the titular church of Santi Nereo e Achilleo on May 13, 1468. He was not sent the red hat until February 1471.

He died in Kalocsa sometime between February 22 and 26, 1471. He is buried in Kalocsa.
