= Stephanus Brodericus =

Croatian bishop and writer

Stephanus Brodericus (Croatian: Stjepan Brodarić; Hungarian: Brodarics István; c. 1480 – 17 November 1539) was a Croatian–Hungarian bishop, diplomat, chancellor and humanist writer. He started his studies in Pécs and continued at the universities of Bologna and Padua, receiving his Doctorate in Canon Law in 1506.

After his return to Hungary at the age of 35-36 he worked in Esztergom, then got into the chancellery of Szatmár as a secretary in 1508. Brodericus participated in the coronation of the two-year-old Louis II in 4 June.

In 1517 he was appointed canon to the bishop of Pécs, received a diploma from Louis II that extended his crests, and shortly afterwards Brodericus was made head prelate of Pécs. The Hungarian-Croatian bishop spent most of his time in the chancellery: the most important organ of the Hungarian internal and foreign affairs. He mostly dealt with issues concerning foreign affairs. His series of diplomatic tasks began in 1521, which only ended with his death.

In 1521 he became secretary to the king, in 1524 dean cantor at the Esztergom Basilica. He also served as the king's chancellor and the bishop of Srijem. King János Szapolyai nominated Brodericus as Bishop of Pécs in 1536; he became Bishop of Vác in 1537 and served there until his death in 1539.

Brodericus participated in several diplomatic missions and wrote an account of the 1526 Battle of Mohács in his 1568 book Clades in campo Mohacz. Eight editions of the book were eventually published.
