= St Paul's Church, Bač =

St Paul's Church
- Crkva svetog apostola Pavla
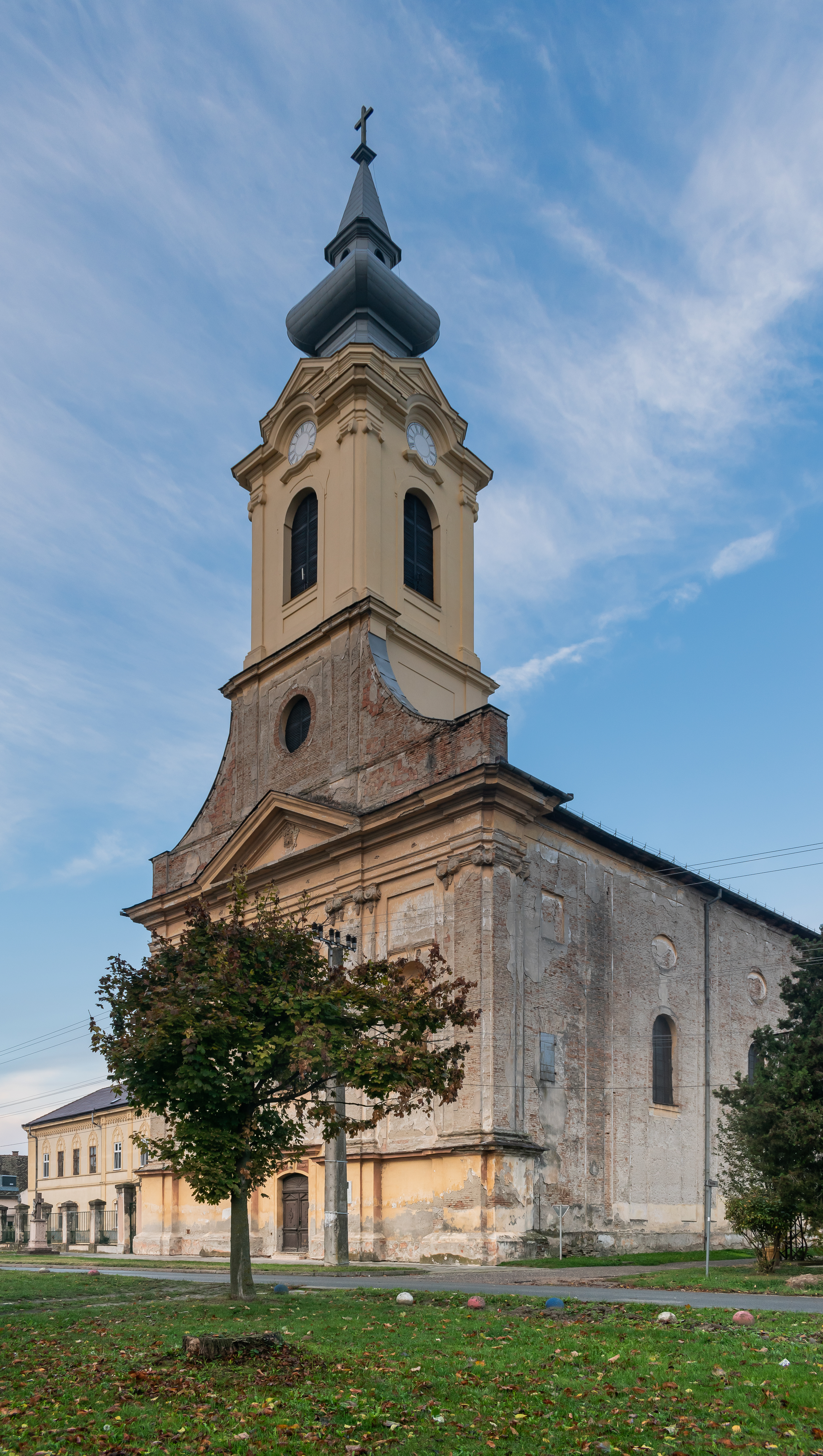
- St Paul's Church
- St Paul's Church
- 45°23′35″N 19°13′41″E
- Location: Bač, Vojvodina
- Country: Serbia
- Denomination: Roman Catholic

History
- Dedication: Saint Paul

Architecture
- Style: Neoclassicism
- Years built: 1773-1780

Administration
- Archdiocese: Roman Catholic Diocese of Subotica

St Paul's Church (Serbo-Croatian: Crkva svetog apostola Pavla) is a Roman Catholic Parish church in Bač in Vojvodina, Serbia. The church was designed by Oswald Gáspár, architect of Czech origin and the building was constructed between 1773 and 1780. Local parish was important regional centre before the Ottoman conquest of medieval Hungary. Following the Great Turkish War parish was renewed in 1688 and in 1766 Archbishop Bátyany appointed himself as the parish priest. He later funded the building of the new church at his own expense. The majority of the parishioners as well as 14 out of 17 pastors until 2023 were of Šokci community with smaller groups of Catholic Hungarians, Germans and Slovaks.
