= Sióagárd =

- Coat of arms

- Location of Sióagárd in Hungary
- Coordinates: 46°23′21″N 18°38′59″E
- Country: Hungary
- Region: Southern Transdanubia
- County: Tolna

Area
  - Total: 24.4 km^{2} (9.4 sq mi)

Population (2011)
  - Total: 1,268
  - Density: 52.0/km^{2} (135/sq mi)
- Time zone: UTC+1 (CET)
  - Summer (DST): UTC+2 (CEST)
- Postal code: 7171
- Area code: +36 74
- Website: www.sioagard.hu

Sióagárd is a village in Tolna County, in central Hungary. The Sárvíz river flows into the Sió in the village.
