= Kölesd =

- Location of Tolna county in Hungary

- Location within Hungary
- Coordinates: 46°30′37″N 18°35′25″E
- Country: Hungary
- County: Tolna

Area
  - Total: 38.1 km^{2} (14.7 sq mi)

Population (2011)
  - Total: 1,516
  - Density: 39.8/km^{2} (103/sq mi)
- Time zone: UTC+1 (CET)
  - Summer (DST): UTC+2 (CEST)
- Postal code: 7052
- Area code: 74

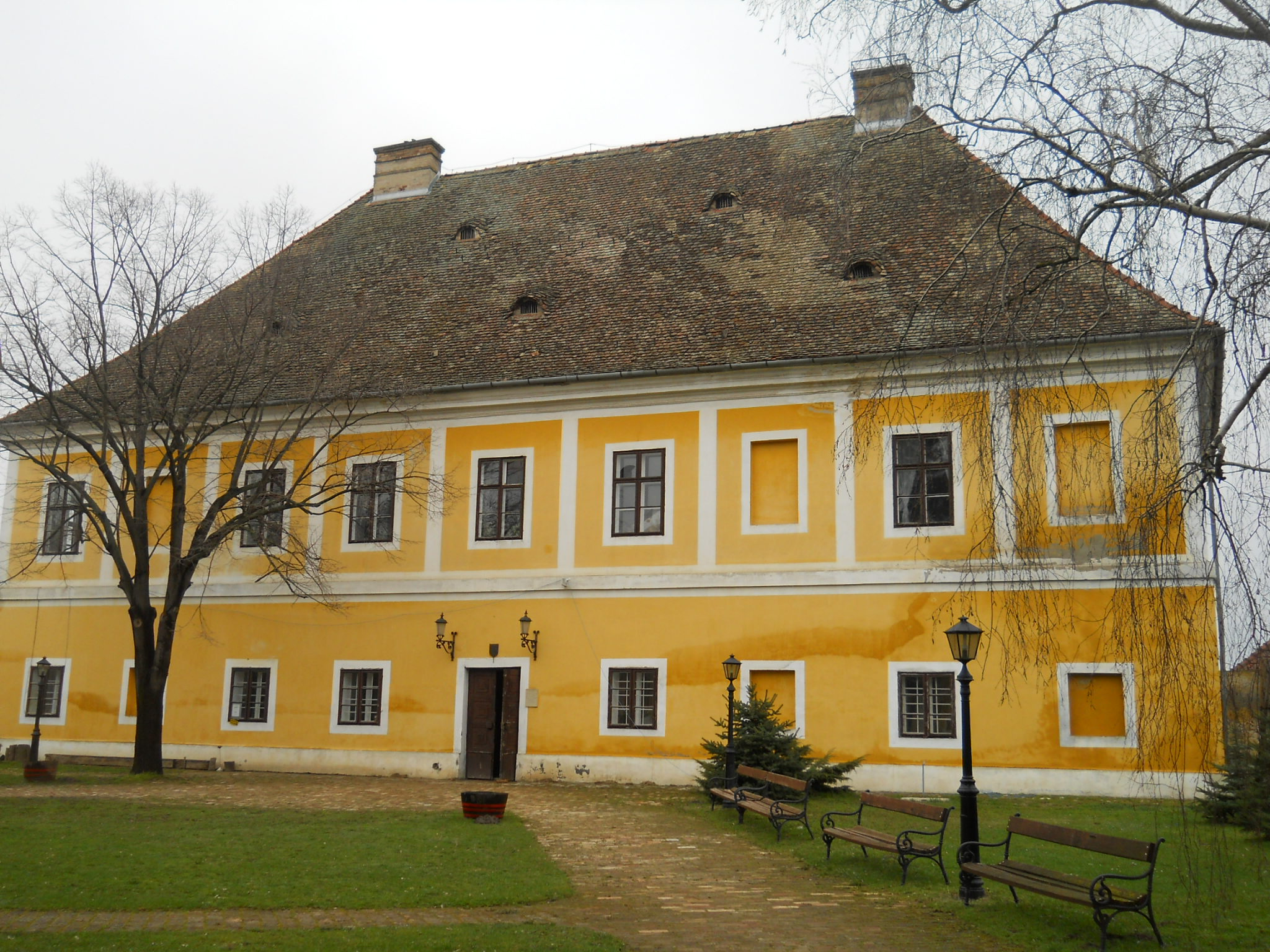
Kölesd

Kölesd is a village in Tolna county, Hungary.
