= Kisvaszar =

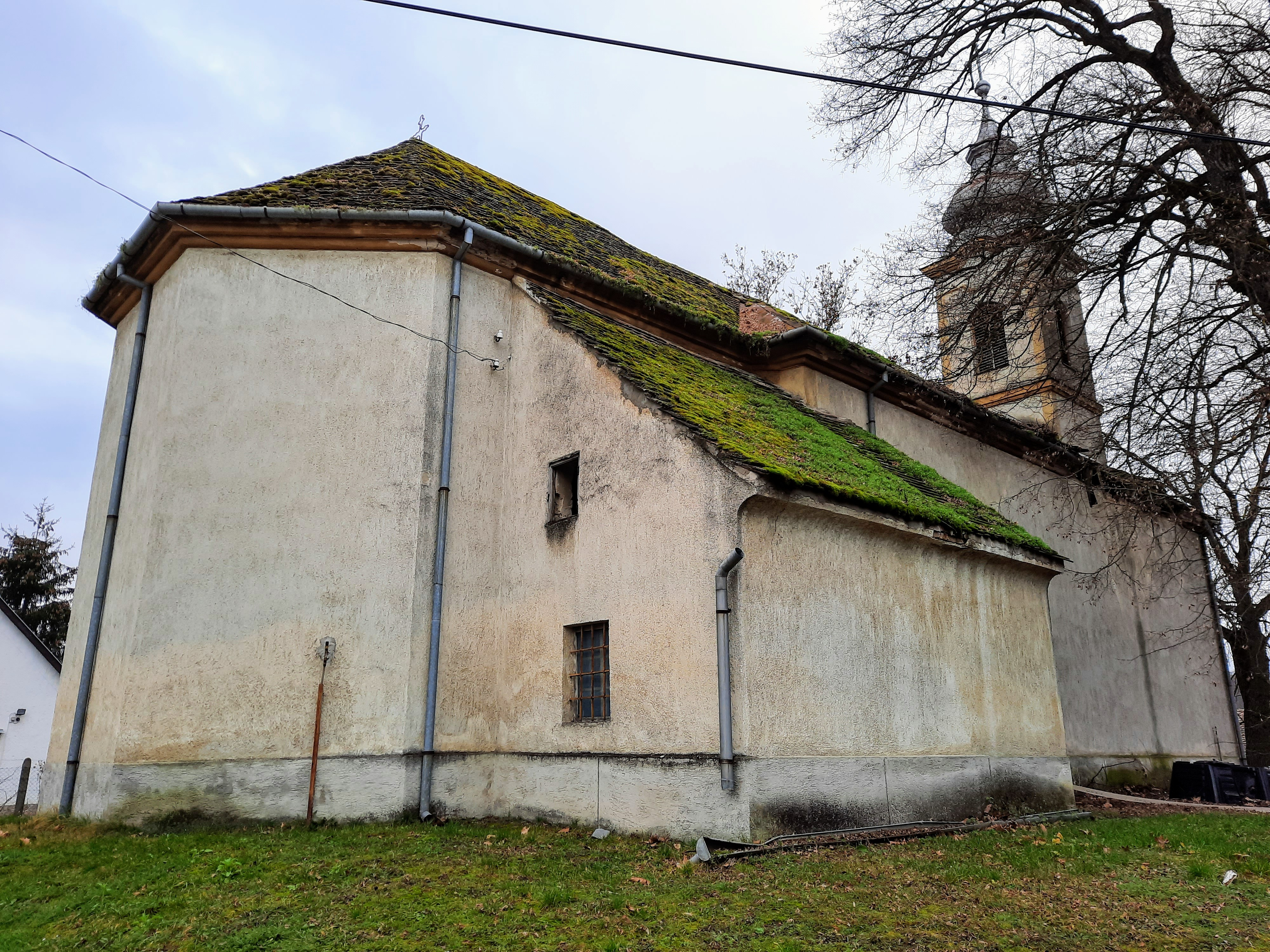

- Location of Baranya county in Hungary

- Location of Kisvaszar
- Coordinates: 46.27727°N 18.21200°E
- Country: Hungary
- County: Baranya

Area
  - Total: 20.35 km^{2} (7.86 sq mi)

Population (2004)
  - Total: 332
  - Density: 16.31/km^{2} (42.2/sq mi)
- Time zone: UTC+1 (CET)
  - Summer (DST): UTC+2 (CEST)
- Postal code: 7381
- Area code: 72

Kisvaszar is a village in Baranya county, Hungary.
