= Somogy County (former) =

County of the Kingdom of Hungary

Somogy County Comitatus Simigiensis (Latin) Somogy vármegye (Hungarian) Komitat Schomodei (German)
- County of the Kingdom of Hungary (11th century-1596, 1715-1946)
- Coat of arms

- Capital: Somogyvár; Kaposvár (1749-1946)
- Area
  - 1910: 6,675 km^{2} (2,577 sq mi)
- Population
  - 1910: 365,961
- History
  - Established: 11th century
  - Merged to Zala-Somogy County: 1596
  - County recreated: 1715
  - Monarchy abolished: 1 February 1946
- Today part of: Hungary

Somogy was an administrative county (comitatus) of the Kingdom of Hungary. Its territory, which was slightly larger than that of present Somogy county, is now in south-western Hungary. The capital of the county was Kaposvár.

== Geography ==
Somogy County shared borders with the Hungarian counties of Zala, Veszprém, Tolna, Baranya, Verőce and Belovár-Körös (the latter two part of Croatia-Slavonia). It extended along the southern shore of Lake Balaton and encompassed the region south of the lake. The river Drava (Hungarian: Dráva) formed most of its southern border. Its area was 6530 km^{2} around 1910.

== History ==
In the 10th century, the Hungarian Nyék tribe occupied the region around Lake Balaton, mainly the areas which are known today as Zala and Somogy counties. Somogy County arose as one of the first comitatuses of the Kingdom of Hungary, in the 11th century.

== Demographics ==
=== 1900 ===
In 1900, the county had a population of 345,586 people and was composed of the following linguistic communities:

Total:

- Hungarian: 310,320 (89.8%)
- German: 20,193 (5.8%)
- Croatian: 11,641 (3.4%)
- Romanian: 381 (0.1%)
- Slovak: 291 (0.1%)
- Serbian: 28 (0.0%)
- Ruthenian: 8 (0.0%)
- Other or unknown: 2,724 (0.8%)

According to the census of 1900, the county was composed of the following religious communities:

Total:

- Roman Catholic: 251,246 (72.7%)
- Calvinist: 65,621 (19.0%)
- Lutheran: 17,481 (5.1%)
- Jewish: 10,969 (3.2%)
- Unitarian: 81 (0.0%)
- Greek Catholic: 77 (0.0%)
- Greek Orthodox: 66 (0.0%)
- Other or unknown: 45 (0.0%)

=== 1910 ===
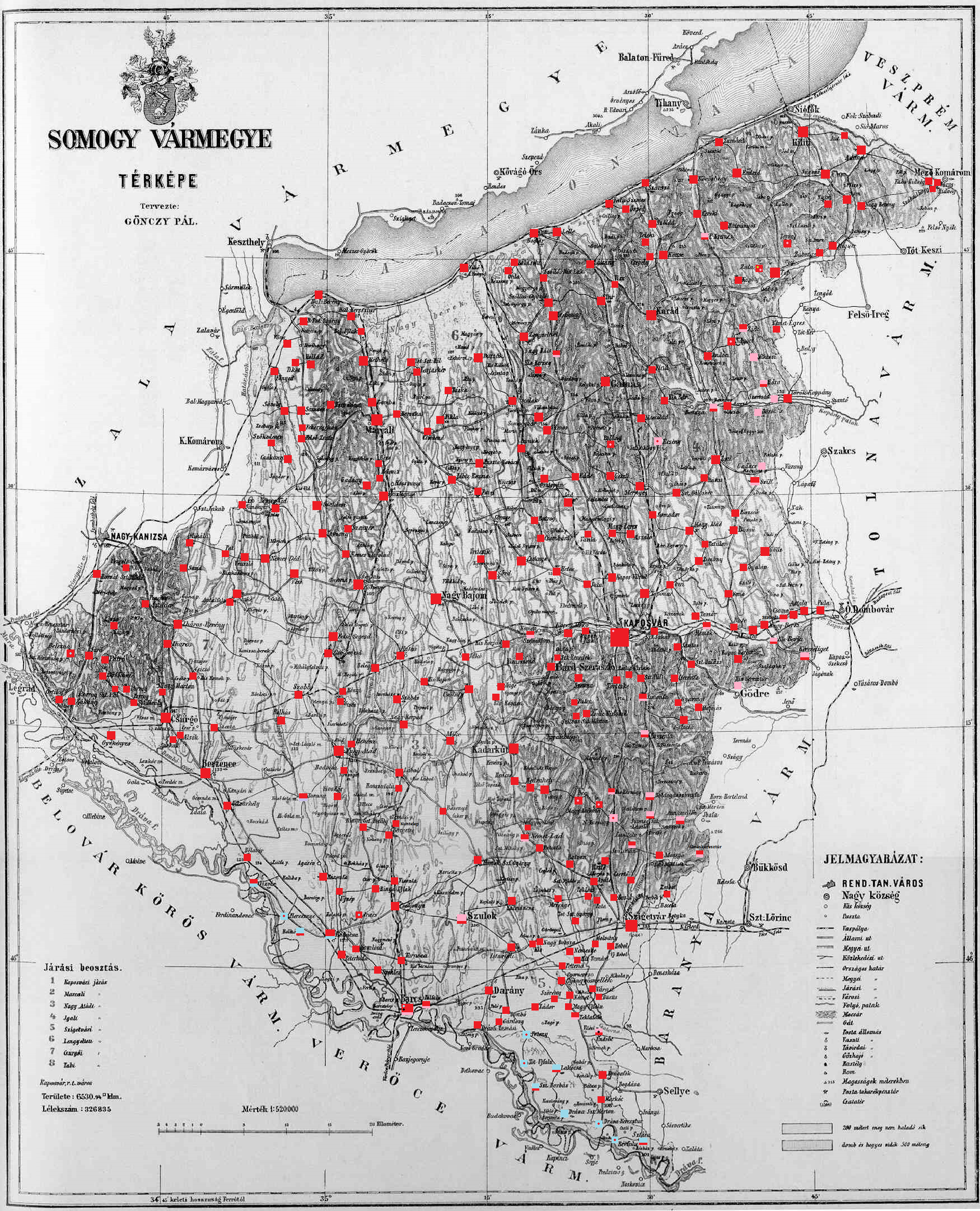
Ethnic map of the county with data of the 1910 census (see the key in the description).

In 1910, the county had a population of 365,961 people and was composed of the following linguistic communities:

Total:

- Hungarian: 333,597 (91.2%)
- German: 18,718 (5.1%)
- Croatian: 9,934 (2.7%)
- Slovak: 364 (0.1%)
- Serbian: 44 (0.0%)
- Romanian: 63 (0.0%)
- Ruthenian: 4 (0.0%)
- Other or unknown: 3,237 (0.9%)

According to the census of 1910, the county was composed of the following religious communities:

Total:

- Roman Catholic: 273,650 (74.8%)
- Calvinist: 63,569 (17.4%)
- Lutheran: 17,700 (4.9%)
- Jewish: 10,645 (2.9%)
- Greek Orthodox: 129 (0.0%)
- Greek Catholic: 106 (0.0%)
- Unitarian: 104 (0.0%)
- Other or unknown: 58 (0.0%)

The city of Siófok, which was in Somogy county before the 1850s, reverted from Veszprém county to Somogy county before World War II. After World War II, the district of Szigetvár went to Baranya county.

== Subdivisions ==
In the early 20th century, the subdivisions of Somogy County were:

Districts (járás)
District	Capital (székhely)
Barcs	Barcs
Csurgó	Csurgó
Igal	Igal
Kaposvár	Kaposvár
Lengyeltóti	Lengyeltóti
Marcali	Marcali
Nagyatád	Nagyatád
Szigetvár	Szigetvár
Tab	Tab
Urban districts (rendezett tanácsú város)
Kaposvár
