= Mágocs =

- Town
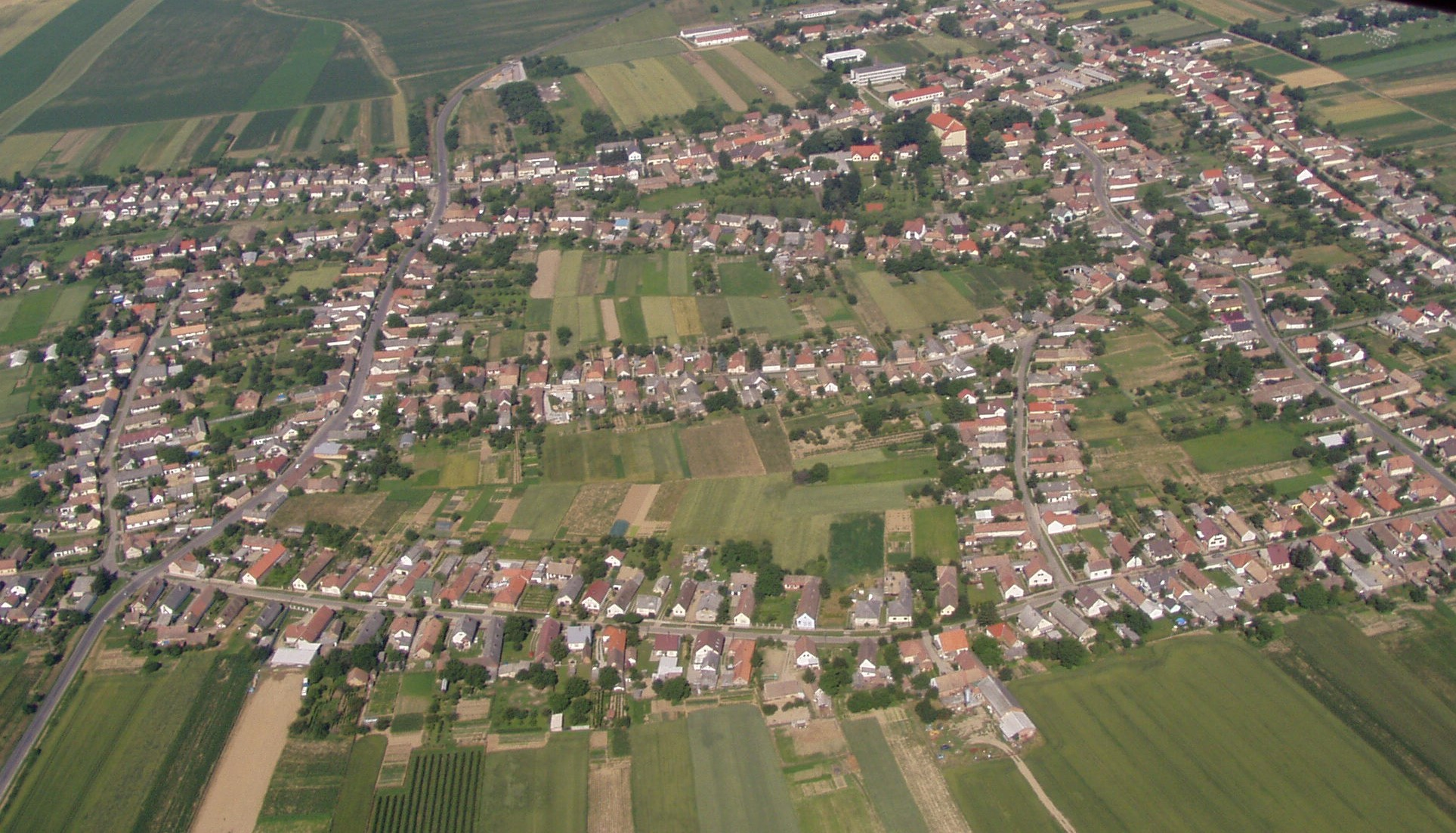

- Flag Coat of arms

- Location of Mágocs
- Coordinates: 46.3473°N 18.2343°E
- Country: Hungary
- County: Baranya
- District: Hegyhát

Area
  - Total: 42.54 km^{2} (16.42 sq mi)

Population (2023)
  - Total: 2,077
  - Density: 59.42/km^{2} (153.9/sq mi)
- Time zone: UTC+1 (CET)
  - Summer (DST): UTC+2 (CEST)
- Postal code: 7342
- Area code: (+36) 72
- Website: www.magocs.hu

Mágocs (German: Magotsch) is a town in Baranya County, Hungary.

== Demographics ==
In 2023, the town had a total population of 2077. As of 2022, the town was 90.8% Hungarian, 7.6% German, 5.9% Gypsy, and 1.6% of non-European origin. The population was 48.5% Roman Catholic, and 3.6% Lutheran.
