= Igal, Hungary =

Igal
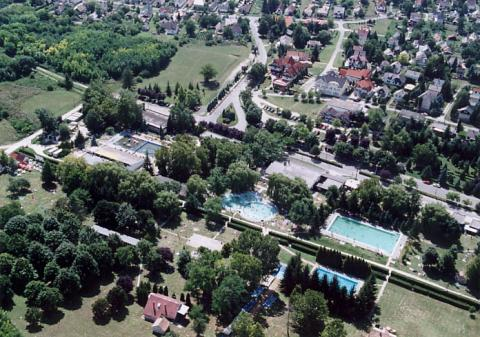
- Aerial view of thermal bath

- Flag Coat of arms

- Location of Igal, Hungary
- Coordinates: 46.53886°N 17.93988°E
- Country: Hungary
- Region: Southern Transdanubia
- County: Somogy
- District: Kaposvár
- RC Diocese: Kaposvár

Area
  - Total: 36.06 km^{2} (13.92 sq mi)

Population (2017)
  - Total: 1,304
  - Density: 36.16/km^{2} (93.66/sq mi)
- Demonym: igali
- Time zone: UTC+1 (CET)
  - Summer (DST): UTC+2 (CEST)
- Postal code: 7275
- Area code: (+36) 82
- Patron Saint: Saint Anne
- NUTS 3 code: HU232
- MP: Mihály Witzmann (Fidesz)
- Website: Igal Online

Igal is a town in Somogy county, Hungary. Igal is 43 km (27 mi) south of Zamárdi. Igal Spa has 12 pools with adventure elements.
