= Tolna County (former) =

County of the Kingdom of Hungary

Tolna County Comitatus Tolnensis (Latin) Tolna vármegye (Hungarian) Komitat Tolnau (German)
- County of the Kingdom of Hungary (11th century-1543, 1696-1946)
- Coat of arms

- Capital: Tolnavár; Szekszárd (1779-1946)
- Area
  - Coordinates: 46°21′N 18°42′E
  - 1910: 3,537 km^{2} (1,366 sq mi)
- Population
  - 1910: 267,300
- History
  - Established: 11th century
  - Ottoman conquest: 1543
  - County recreated: 1696
  - Monarchy abolished: 1 February 1946
- Today part of: Hungary

Tolna (Latin: Comitatus Tolnensis) was an administrative county of the Kingdom of Hungary. Its territory, which was about the same as that of present Tolna county, is now in central Hungary. The capital of the county was Tolnavár and later Szekszárd.

== Geography ==
Tolna county shared borders with the Hungarian counties Somogy, Veszprém, Fejér, Pest-Pilis-Solt-Kiskun and Baranya. The river Danube formed most of its eastern border. Its area was 3537 km² around 1910.

== History ==
Tolna county arose as one of the first comitatuses of the Kingdom of Hungary, in the 11th century. Part of Hungary was in the 1500s taken and controlled by the Ottoman Empire during the ruling of Suleiman the Magnificent.

== Demographics ==
=== 1900 ===
In 1900, the county had a population of 253,182 people and was composed of the following linguistic communities:

Total:

- Hungarian: 172,967 (68.3%)
- German: 77,293 (30.5%)
- Serbian: 1,011 (0.4%)
- Slovak: 735 (0.3%)
- Croatian: 369 (0.2%)
- Romanian: 1 (0.0%)
- Ruthenian: 0 (0.0%)
- Other or unknown: 806 (0.3%)

According to the census of 1900, the county was composed of the following religious communities:

Total:

- Roman Catholic: 172,151 (68.0%)
- Calvinist: 39,141 (15.5%)
- Lutheran: 31,836 (12.6%)
- Jewish: 8,427 (3.3%)
- Eastern Orthodox: 1,108 (0.4%)
- Greek Catholic: 123 (0.0%)
- Unitarian: 19 (0.0%)
- Other or unknown: 377 (0.2%)

=== 1910 ===
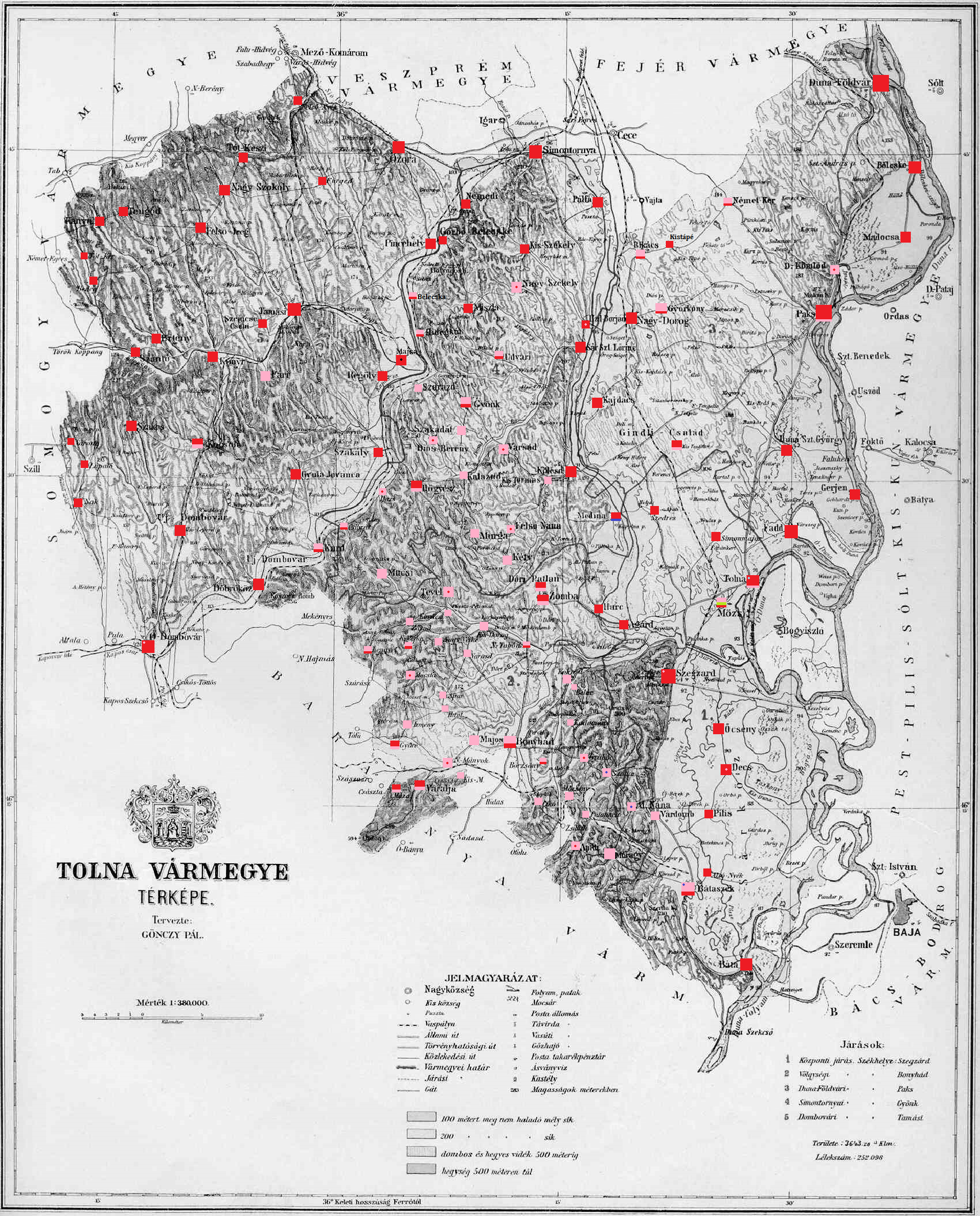
Ethnic map of the county with data of the 1910 census (see the key in the description).

In 1910, the county had a population of 267,267 people and was composed of the following linguistic communities:

Total:

- Hungarian: 189,521 (70.9%)
- German: 74,376 (27.9%)
- Serbian: 1,102 (0.4%)
- Slovak: 789 (0.3%)
- Croatian: 343 (0.1%)
- Romanian: 39 (0.0%)
- Ruthenian: 4 (0.0%)
- Other or unknown: 1,085 (0.4%)

According to the census of 1910, the county was composed of the following religious communities:

Total:

- Roman Catholic: 185,863 (69.5%)
- Calvinist: 39,500 (14.8%)
- Lutheran: 31,976 (12.0%)
- Jewish: 8,159 (3.1%)
- Eastern Orthodox: 1,167 (0.4%)
- Greek Catholic: 209 (0.1%)
- Unitarian: 20 (0.0%)
- Other or unknown: 355 (0.1%)

== Subdivisions ==
In the early 20th century, the subdivisions of Tolna county were:

Districts (járás)
District	Capital
Dombóvár	Dombóvár
Dunaföldvár	Paks
Központ	Szekszárd
Simontornya	Gyönk
Tamási	Tamási
Völgység	Bonyhád
Urban districts (rendezett tanácsú város)
Szekszárd (from 1905)

== See also ==
- Székelys of Bukovina
