= Ág =

- Village
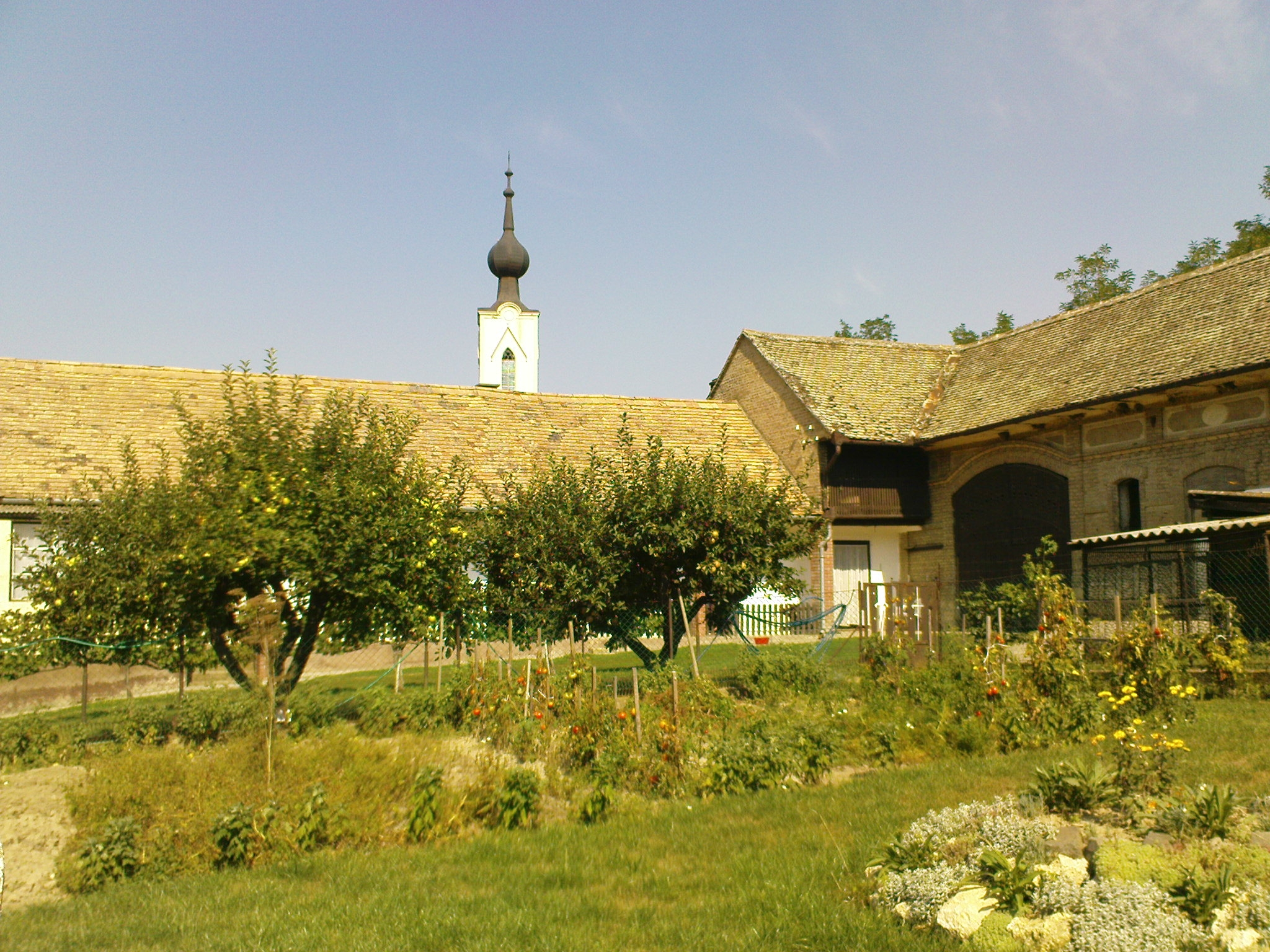

- Location of Ág Ág (Hungary)
- Coordinates: 46.29587°N 18.20241°E
- Country: Hungary
- County: Baranya
- District: Hegyhát

Area
  - Total: 12.03 km^{2} (4.64 sq mi)

Population (2019)
  - Total: 178
  - Density: 14.8/km^{2} (38.3/sq mi)
- Time zone: UTC+1 (CET)
  - Summer (DST): UTC+2 (CEST)
- Postal code: 7381
- Area code: 72
- NUTS 3: HU231
- HCSO: 25812

Ág ([ˈɒɡ], German: Neuda) is a village (Hungarian: község) in northern Baranya County, Hegyhát District, in southern Hungary. Its population at the 2011 Census was 177. Until the end of World War II, the inhabitants' majority was Protestant Danube Swabians. Most of the former German settlers were expelled to Allied-occupied Germany and Allied-occupied Austria in 1945–1948, following the Potsdam Agreement. Only a few Germans of Hungary live there, the majority today are the descendants of Hungarians from the Czechoslovak–Hungarian population exchange. They got the houses of the former Danube Swabian inhabitants.

== Etymology ==
The village's name comes from the word ág, meaning 'stream'. It was recorded as Naghagh in 1487.

== Local government ==
The village is governed by a mayor with a four-person council. The local government of the village operates a joint council office with the nearby localities of Gerényes, Kisvaszar, Tarrós, Tékes and Vásárosdombó. Ág maintains a branch office, but the seat of the joint council is in Vásárosdombó.

As of the election of 2019, the village also has a local minority self-government for its Roma community, with three elected representatives.

== Transportation ==
The village is a cul-de-sac community, with only one access road connecting it to Road 6546 via nearby village Gerényes.

=== Railway ===
- Vásárosdombó train station, 5.6 km (3.5 mi) to the west of the village off Road 6546. The station is on the Pusztaszabolcs–Pécs railway line and is operated by MÁV.

=== Road ===
- Road 6546 connects the village to Vásárosdombó to the west and Komló to the south.
- Main road 611, a north–south road accessible in Vásárosdombó, connects the village to its district seat Sásd and the town of Dombóvár.
