= Hegyhát District =

Hegyhát District Hegyháti járás
- Districts of Hungary
- Coat of arms

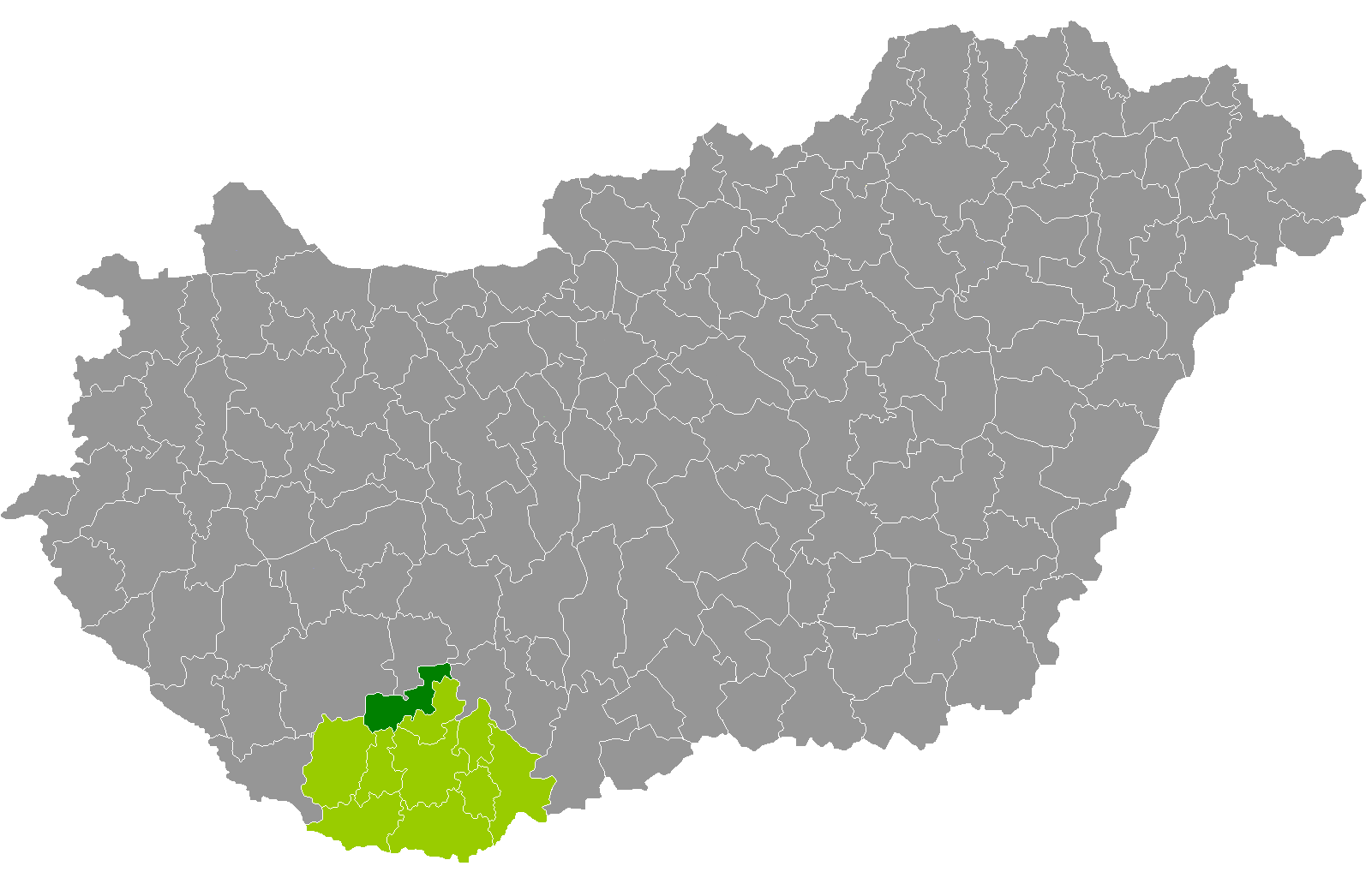
- Hegyhát District within Hungary and Baranya County.
- Coordinates: 46.25°N 18.10°E
- Country: Hungary
- County: Baranya
- District seat: Sásd

Area
  - Total: 360.72 km^{2} (139.27 sq mi)
  - Rank: 6th in Baranya

Population (2011 census)
  - Total: 12,744
  - Rank: 8th in Baranya
  - Density: 35/km^{2} (91/sq mi)

Hegyhát (Hungarian: Hegyháti járás) is a district in northern part of Baranya County, Hungary. The district is located in the Southern Transdanubia Statistical Region. It is the only district in Hungarian countryside, which is not named after its district seat.

== Geography ==
Hegyhát District borders with Dombóvár District and Tamási District (Tolna County) to the north, Bonyhád District (Tolna County) to the east, Komló District to the southeast, Pécs District and Szentlőrinc District to the south, Szigetvár District to the southwest, Kaposvár District (Somogy County) to the northwest. The number of the inhabited places in Hegyhát District is 25.

== Municipalities ==
The district has 2 towns and 23 villages. (ordered by population, as of 1 January 2012)

- Alsómocsolád (329)
- Ág (179)
- Bakóca (275)
- Baranyajenő (489)
- Baranyaszentgyörgy (121)
- Felsőegerszeg (135)
- Gerényes (256)
- Gödre (831)
- Kisbeszterce (78)
- Kishajmás (204)
- Kisvaszar (332)
- **Mágocs** (2,388)
- Mekényes (267)
- Meződ (124)
- Mindszentgodisa (870)
- Nagyhajmás (340)
- Palé (106)
- **Sásd** (3,282) – district seat
- Szágy (152)
- Tarrós (123)
- Tékes (230)
- Tormás (284)
- Varga (94)
- Vásárosdombó (1,090)
- Vázsnok (124)

The bolded municipalities are cities.

== See also ==
- List of cities and towns in Hungary
