= Tékes =

- Village (Falva)
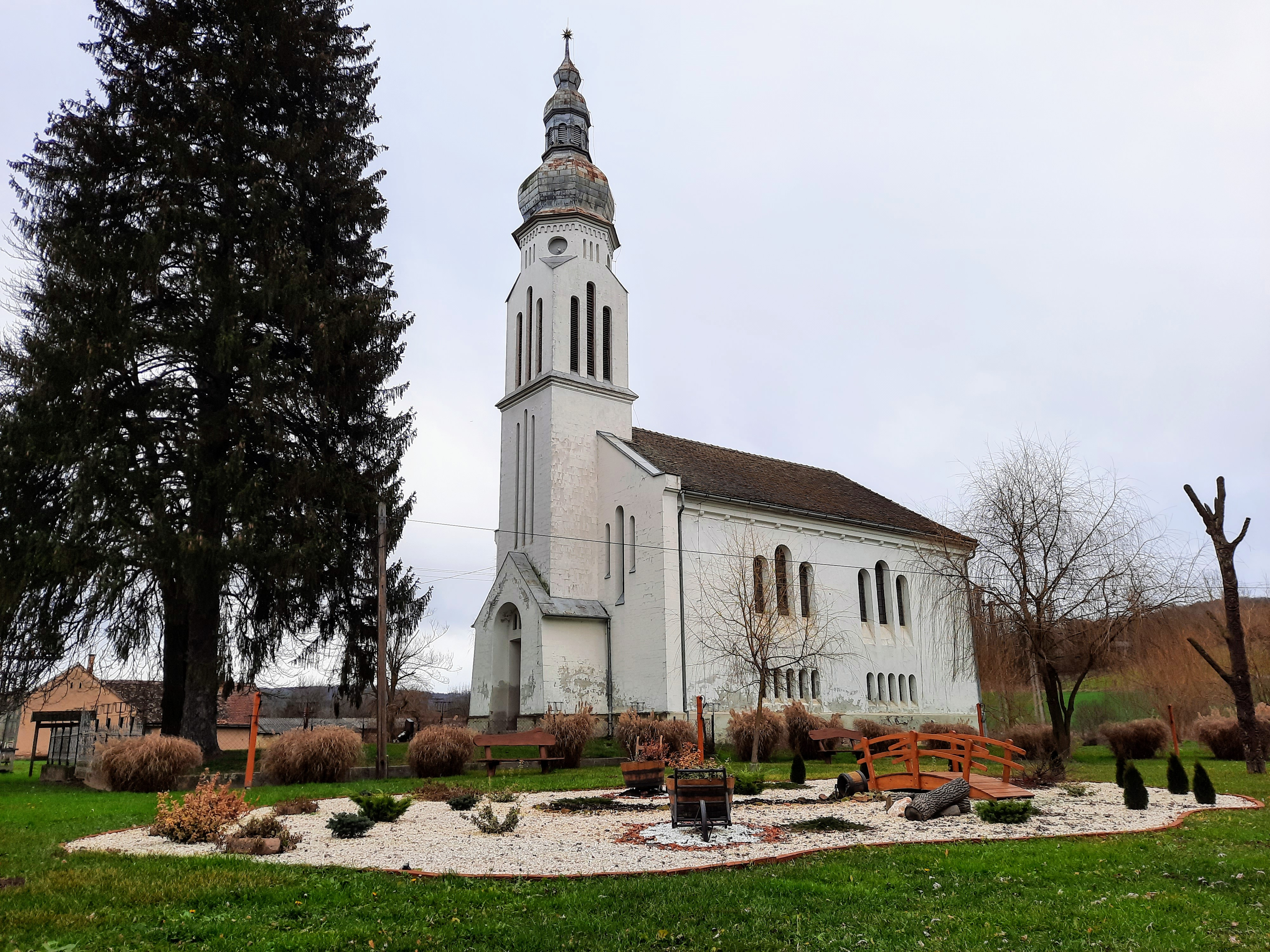

- Location in Baranya County Tékes (Hungary)
- Coordinates: 46°17′N 18°10′E
- Country: Hungary
- County: Baranya
- District: Hegyhát

Government
  - Type: Mayor-council
  - Mayor: Gábor Máté (Ind.)

Area
  - Total: 12.56 km^{2} (4.85 sq mi)

Population (2021)
  - Total: 224
  - Density: 17.8/km^{2} (46.2/sq mi)
- Time zone: UTC+1 (CET)
  - Summer (DST): UTC+2 (CEST)
- Postal code: 7381
- Area code: 72
- NUTS 3: HU231
- HCSO: 27702

Tékes ([ˈteːkɛʃ]) is a village (Hungarian: község) in Hegyhát District, northern Baranya county, in the Southern Transdanubia region of Hungary. Its population at the 2011 census was 248.

== Geography ==
The village is located at 46° 17′ 9″ N, 18° 10′ 19″ E. Its area is 12.56 km^{2} (4.85 sq mi). It is part of the Southern Transdanubia statistical region, and administratively it falls under Baranya County and then Hegyhát District. It lies 24 km (15 mi) north of the city of Pécs and 3.8 km (2.4 mi) southeast of the village of Vásárosdombó.

== Demographics ==
=== 2011 census ===
As of the census of 2011, there were 248 residents, 90 households, and 69 families living in the village. The population density was 51 inhabitants per square mile (20 inhabitants/km^{2}). There were 101 dwellings at an average density of 21 per square mile (8.1/km^{2}). The average household size was 2.66. The average number of children was 1.26. The average family size was 3.01.

Religious affiliation was 51.5% Roman Catholic, 0.4% Calvinist, 6.3% Lutheran, 1.3% other and 23.8% unaffiliated, with 16.7% declining to answer.

The village had a significant ethnic minority Roma population of 21.8%. There were also small numbers of Germans (1.7%) and Poles (0.4%). The vast majority declared themselves as Hungarian (95.4%), with 4.6% declining to answer. (Note: As a person can affiliate themselves with more than one ethnic group (nationality), the totals may be greater than 100%.)

== Local government ==
The village is governed by a mayor with a four-person council. The local government of the village operates a joint council office with the nearby localities of Ág, Gerényes, Kisvaszar, Tarrós and Vásárosdombó. The seat of the joint council is in Vásárosdombó.

As of the election of 2019, the village also has a local minority self-government for its Roma community, with three elected representatives.

== Transportation ==
=== Railway ===
- Vásárosdombó Train Station, 5.0 km (3.1 mi) to the west of the village. The station is on the Pusztaszabolcs–Pécs and Dombóvár-Komló railway lines and is operated by MÁV.

== Attractions ==
- Lutheran Church
- Roman Catholic Church
