= Gödre =

- Village
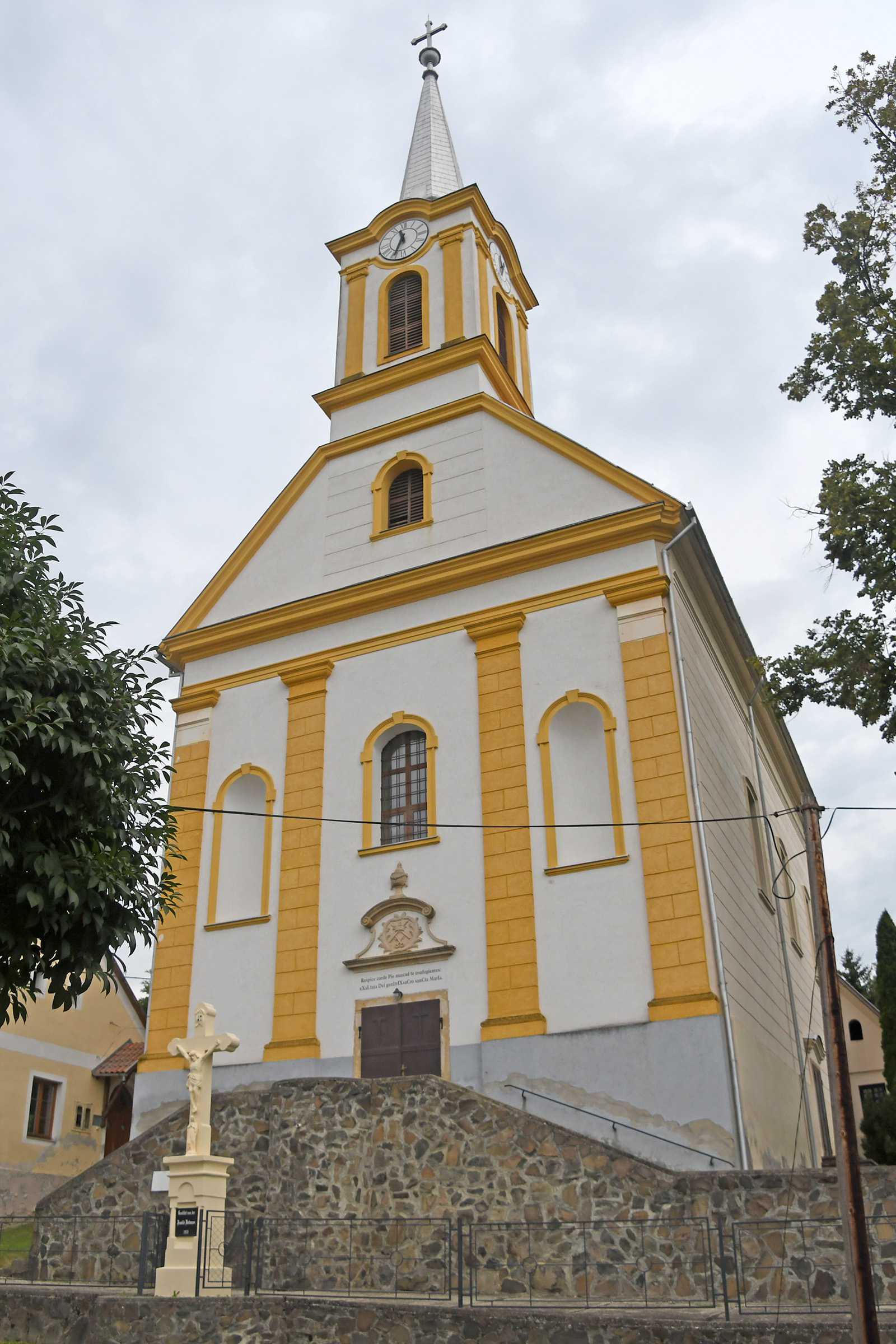

- Seal

- Location in Baranya County Gödre (Hungary)
- Coordinates: 46°17′13″N 17°58′24″E
- Country: Hungary
- County: Baranya
- District: Hegyhát

Government
  - Type: Mayor-council
  - Mayor: Gábor Gelencsér (Fidesz–KDNP)

Area
  - Total: 39.93 km^{2} (15.42 sq mi)

Population (2021)
  - Total: 735
  - Density: 18.4/km^{2} (47.7/sq mi)
- Time zone: UTC+1 (CET)
  - Summer (DST): UTC+2 (CEST)
- Postal code: 7386
- Area code: 72
- NUTS 3: HU231
- HCSO: 33233
- Website: www.godre.hu

Gödre ([ˈɡødrɛ], German: Gödring or Kedri, Croatian: Đudra) is a village (Hungarian: község) in Hegyhát District, northern Baranya county, in the Southern Transdanubia region of Hungary. Its population at the 2011 census was 913.

== Geography ==
The village is located at 46° 17′ 13″ N, 17° 58′ 24″ E. Its area is 39.93 km^{2} (15.42 sq mi). It is part of the Southern Transdanubia statistical region, and administratively it falls under Baranya County and then Hegyhát District. It lies 10.8 km (6.7 mi) northwest of the town of Sásd and 31.2 km (19.4 mi) northwest of Pécs.

== Demographics ==
=== 2011 census ===
As of the census of 2011, there were 913 residents, 348 households, and 264 families living in the village. The population density was 59 inhabitants per square mile (23 inhabitants/km^{2}). There were 398 dwellings at an average density of 26 dwellings per square mile (10 dwellings/km^{2}). The average household size was 2.64. The average number of children was 1.14. The average family size was 2.91.

Religious affiliation was 67.0% Roman Catholic, 2.4% Calvinist, 0.4% Lutheran, 0.2% other religion, and 9.3% unaffiliated, with 20.7% declining to answer.

The village had an ethnic minority German population of 11.5% and a Roma population of 8.4%. A small number of residents also identified as Bulgarian, Croat and other, non-native to Hungary, totaling less than 1%. The majority declared themselves as Hungarian (82.9%), with 16.7% declining to answer. (Note: As a person can affiliate themselves with more than one ethnic group (nationality), the totals may be greater than 100%.)

== Local government ==
The village is governed by a mayor with a four-person council. The local government of the village operates a joint council office with the nearby localities of Baranyaszentgyörgy, Felsőegerszeg, Meződ, Palé, Sásd, Varga and Vázsnok. The seat of the joint council is in Sásd.

As of the election of 2019, the village also has local minority self-governments for its German and Roma communities, each with three elected representatives.

== Transportation ==
=== Railway ===
- Sásd Train Station, 13 km (8.1 mi) to the southeast of the village. The station is on the Pusztaszabolcs–Pécs and Dombóvár-Komló railway lines and is operated by MÁV.
