= Varga, Hungary =

Varga
- Village (Falva)
- Location in Baranya County Varga (Hungary)
- Coordinates: 46.24772°N 18.14259°E
- Country: Hungary
- County: Baranya
- District: Hegyhát

Government
  - Type: Mayor-council
  - Mayor: Anita Lukácsné Lembach (Ind.)

Area
  - Total: 8.36 km^{2} (3.23 sq mi)

Population (2021)
  - Total: 88
  - Density: 11/km^{2} (27/sq mi)
- Time zone: UTC+1 (CET)
  - Summer (DST): UTC+2 (CEST)
- Postal code: 7370
- Area code: 72
- NUTS 3: HU231
- HCSO: 28529

Varga (Hungarian pronunciation: [ˈvɒrɡɒ]) is a village (Hungarian: község) in Hegyhát District, northern Baranya County, in the Southern Transdanubia region of Hungary. Its population at the 2011 census was 101. It is known for the leather factory that was owned by the family of the same name.

== Geography ==
The village is located at 46° 14′ 52.79″ N, 18° 8′ 33,32″ E. Its area is 8.36 km^{2} (3.23 sq mi). It is part of the Southern Transdanubia statistical region, and administratively it falls under Baranya County and then Hegyhát District. It lies 3 km (1.9 mi) east of the town of Sásd.

== Demographics ==
=== 2011 census ===
As of the census of 2011, there were 101 residents, 40 households, and 30 families living in the village. The population density was 31 inhabitants per square mile (12/km^{2}). There were 50 dwellings at an average density of 15 per square mile (6/km^{2}). The average household size was 2.55. The average number of children was 1.10. The average family size was 2.90.

Religious affiliation was 52.9% Roman Catholic, 1.0% Calvinist, 1.0% Lutheran, and 11.8% unaffiliated, with 33.3% declining to answer.

The village had a significant ethnic minority Roma population of 21.6%. A small number of residents also identified as Croat (1.0%). The majority declared themselves as Hungarian (76.5%), with 23.5% declining to answer. (Note: As a person can affiliate themselves with more than one ethnic group (nationality), the totals may be greater than 100%.)

== Local government ==
The village is governed by a mayor with a two-person council. The local government of the village operates a joint council office with the nearby localities of Baranyaszentgyörgy, Felsőegerszeg, Gödre, Meződ, Palé, Sásd and Vázsnok. The seat of the joint council is in Sásd.

== Transportation ==
=== Railway ===
- Sásd Train Station, 4.5 km (2.8 mi) to the west of the village. The station is on the Pusztaszabolcs–Pécs and Dombóvár-Komló railway lines and is operated by MÁV.
