= Baranyajenő =

- Village
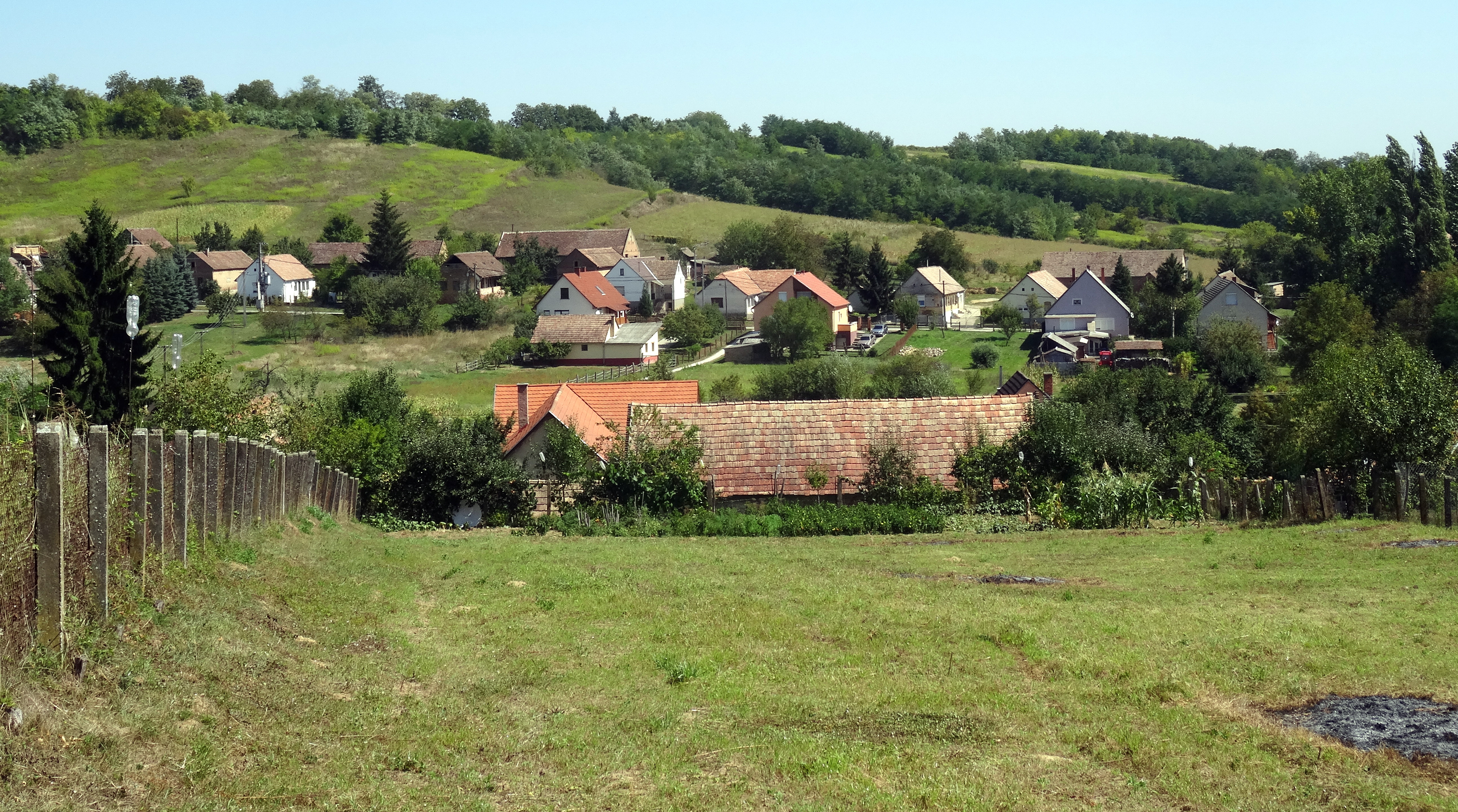

- Seal

- Location in Baranya County Baranyajenő (Hungary)
- Coordinates: 46°16′15″N 18°02′41″E
- Country: Hungary
- County: Baranya
- District: Hegyhát

Government
  - Type: Mayor-council
  - Mayor: Csaba Balogh (Ind.)

Area
  - Total: 15.55 km^{2} (6.00 sq mi)

Population (2021)
  - Total: 424
  - Density: 27.3/km^{2} (70.6/sq mi)
- Time zone: UTC+1 (CET)
  - Summer (DST): UTC+2 (CEST)
- Postal code: 7384
- Area code: 72
- NUTS 3: HU231
- HCSO: 24749
- Website: www.baranyajeno.asp.lgov.hu

Baranyajenő ([ˈbɒrɒɲɒjɛnøː], German: Jening) is a village (Hungarian: község) in Hegyhát District, northern Baranya county, in the Southern Transdanubia region of Hungary. Its population at the 2011 census was 455.

== Geography ==
The village is located at 46° 16′ 15″ N, 18° 2′ 41″ E. Its area is 15.55 km^{2} (6.00 sq mi). It is part of the Southern Transdanubia statistical region, and administratively it falls under Baranya County and Hegyhát District. It lies 5 km (3.1 mi) north of the village of Mindszentgodisa and 26.5 km (16.5 mi) northwest of Pécs.

== Demographics ==
=== 2011 census ===
As of the census of 2011, there were 455 residents, 154 households, and 114 families living in the village. The population density was 76 inhabitants per square mile (29 inhabitants/km^{2}). There were 159 dwellings at an average density of 27 per square mile (10/km^{2}). The average household size was 2.87. The average number of children was 1.37. The average family size was 3.13.

Religious affiliation was 81.2% Roman Catholic, 2.0% Calvinist, 0.7% Lutheran, and 0.7% other religion, with 15.4% declining to answer.

The village had a significant ethnic minority Roma population of 40.3%. A small number of residents also identified as German (2.5%), Romanian (0.2%) and Serb (0.2%). The vast majority declared themselves as Hungarian (96.6%), with 3.4% declining to answer. (Note: As a person can affiliate themselves with more than one ethnic group (nationality), the totals may be greater than 100%.)

== Local government ==
The village is governed by a mayor with a four-person council. The local government of the village operates a joint council office with the nearby localities of Bakóca, Kisbeszterce, Kishajmás, Mindszentgodisa, Szágy, and Tormás. The seat of the joint council is in Mindszentgodisa.

As of the election of 2019, the village also has a local minority self-government for its Roma community, with three elected representatives.

== Transportation ==
=== Railway ===
- Sásd Train Station, 6 km (3.7 mi) east of the village. The station is on the Pusztaszabolcs–Pécs and Dombóvár-Komló railway lines and is operated by MÁV.

== Gallery ==
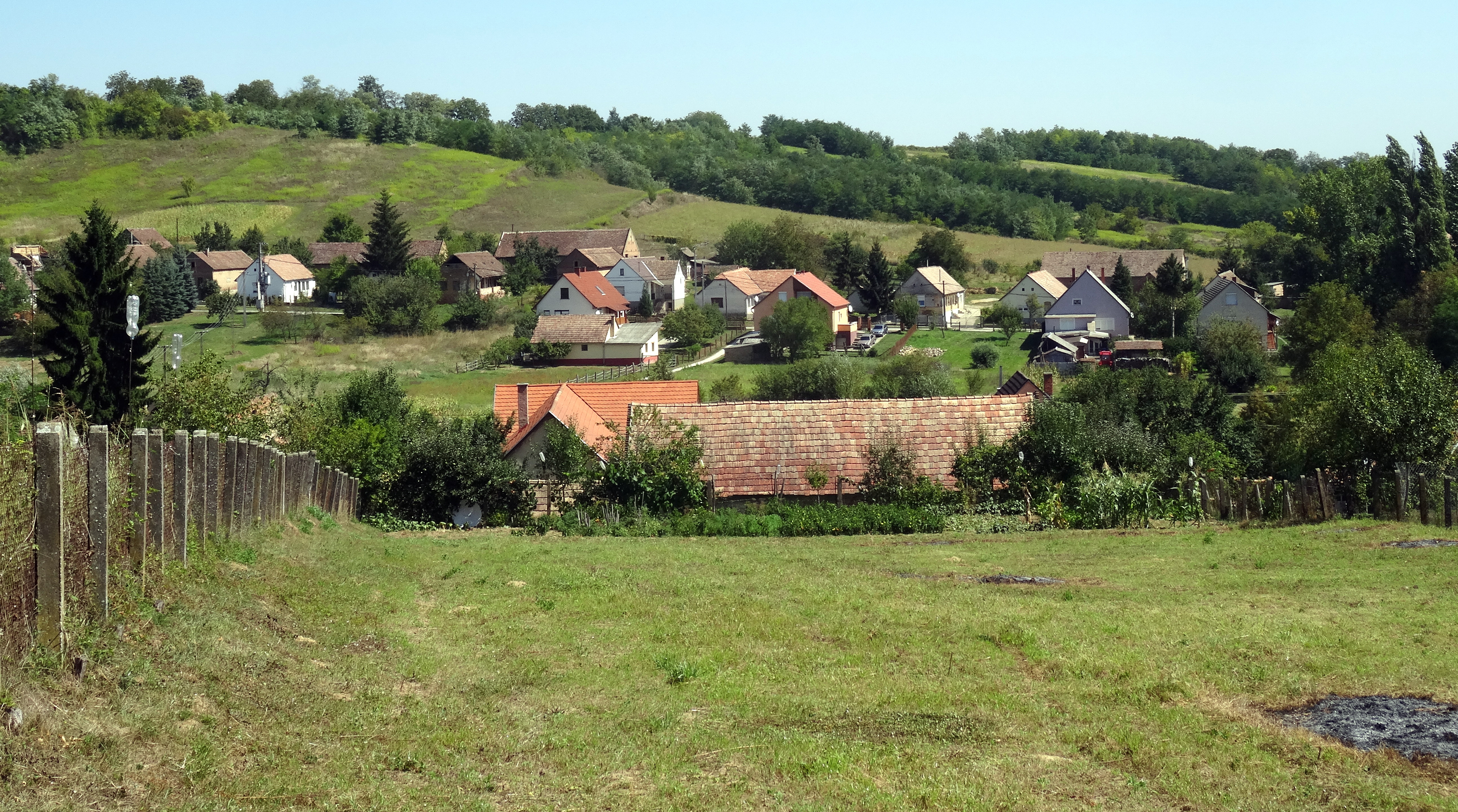
Baranyajenő

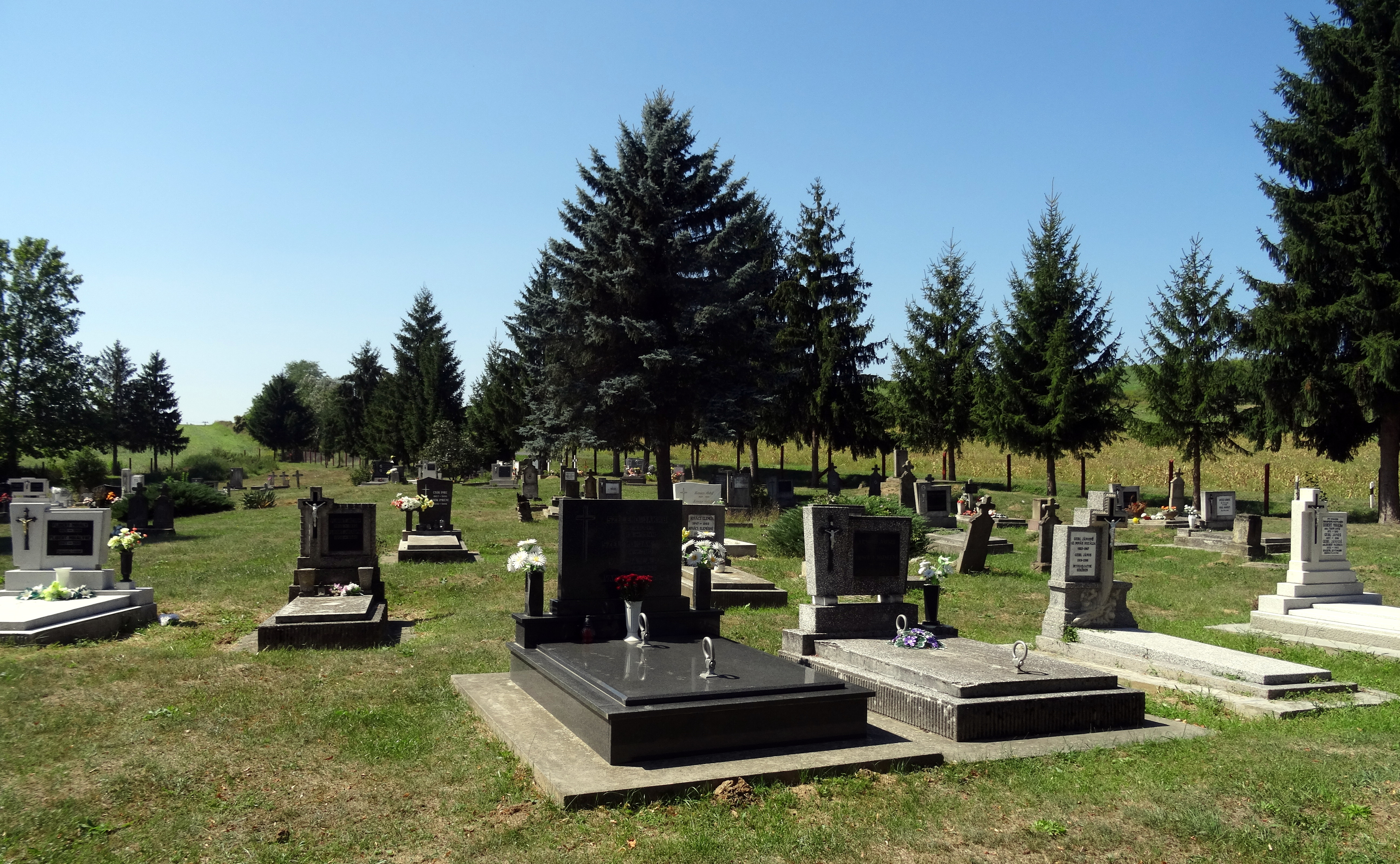
Graveyard of Baranyajenő

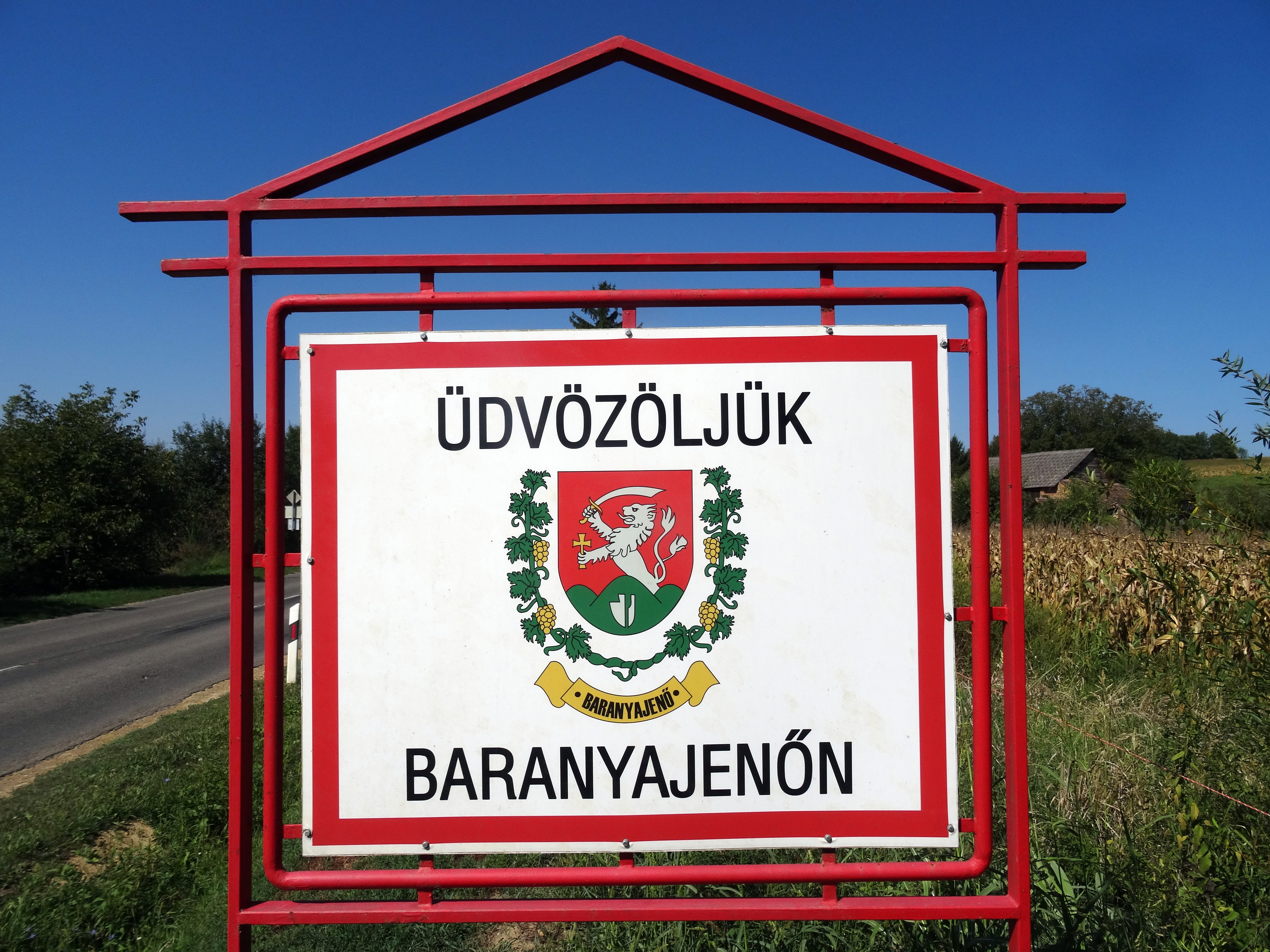
Town sign of Baranyajenő

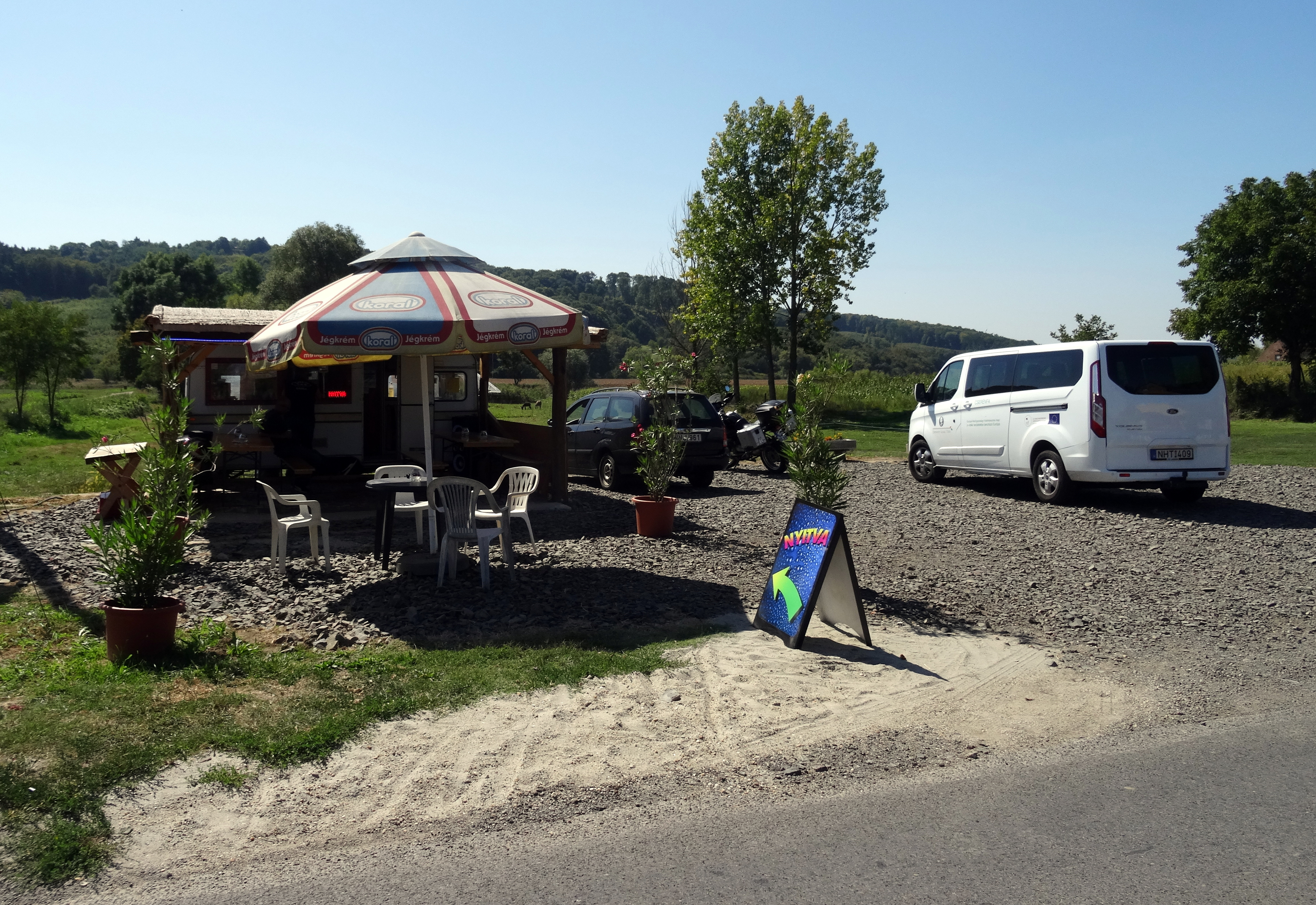
Fast food restaurant in Baranyajenő

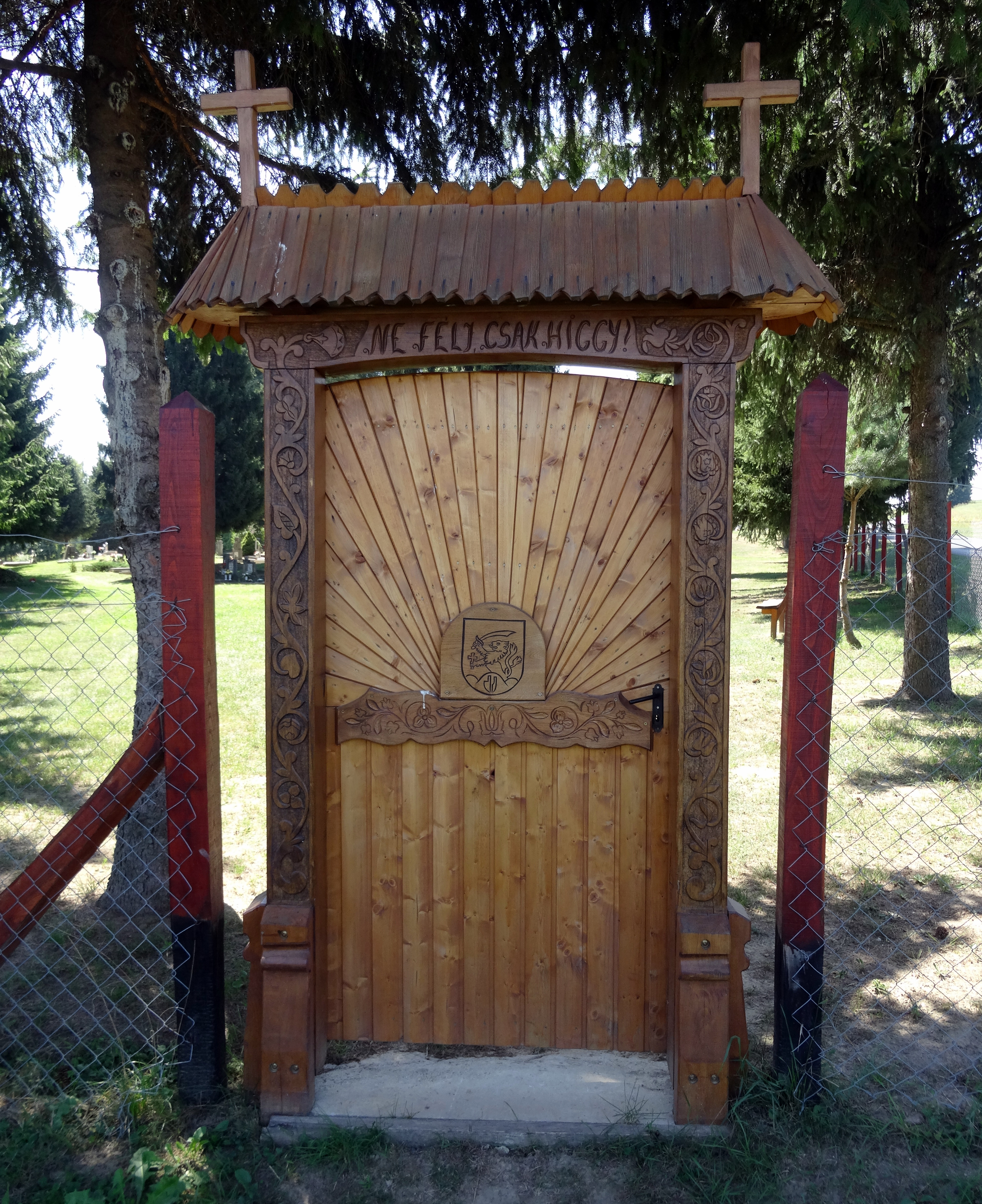
Entrance to the graveyard of Baranyajenő

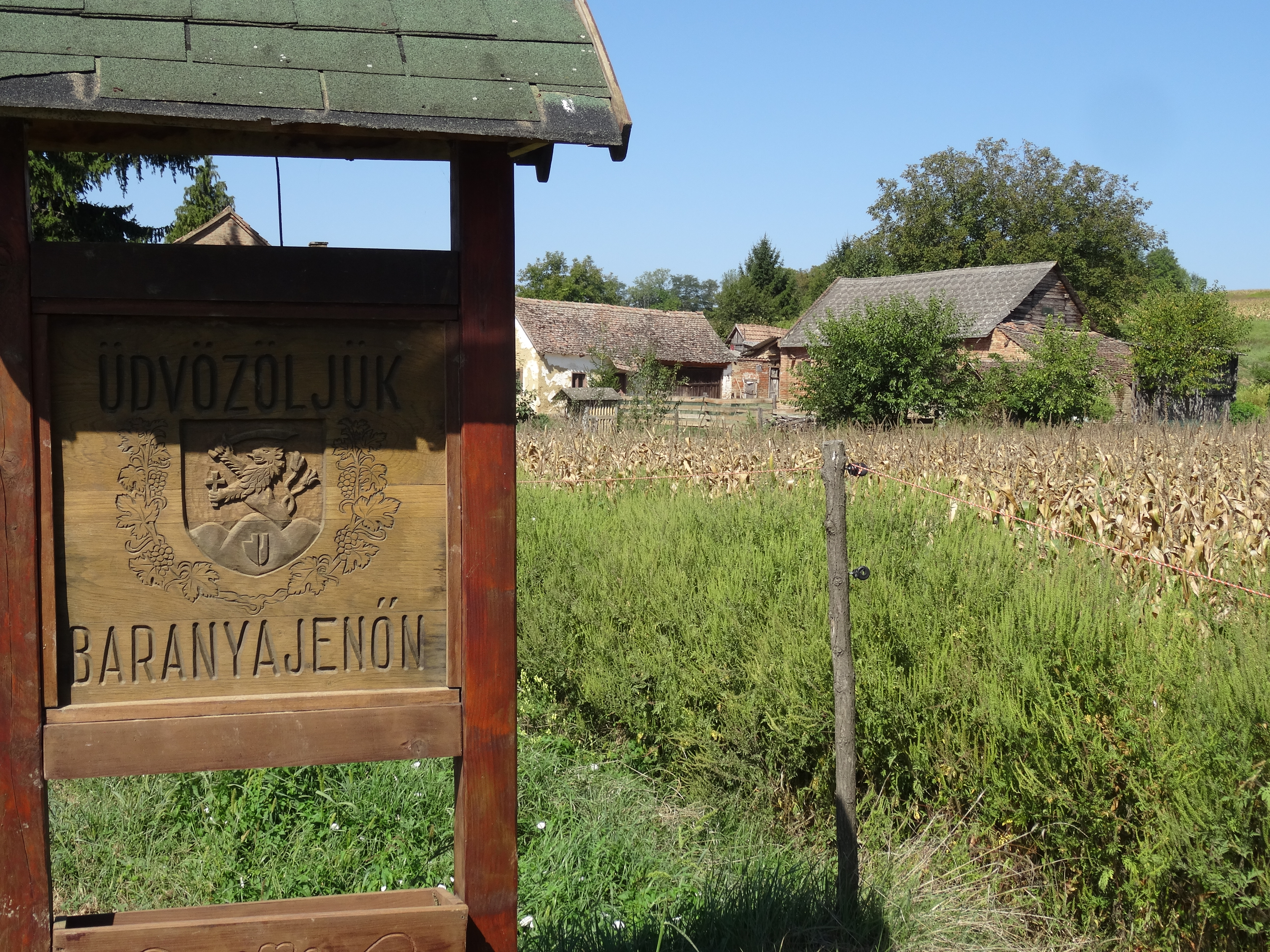
Old town sign of Baranyajenő

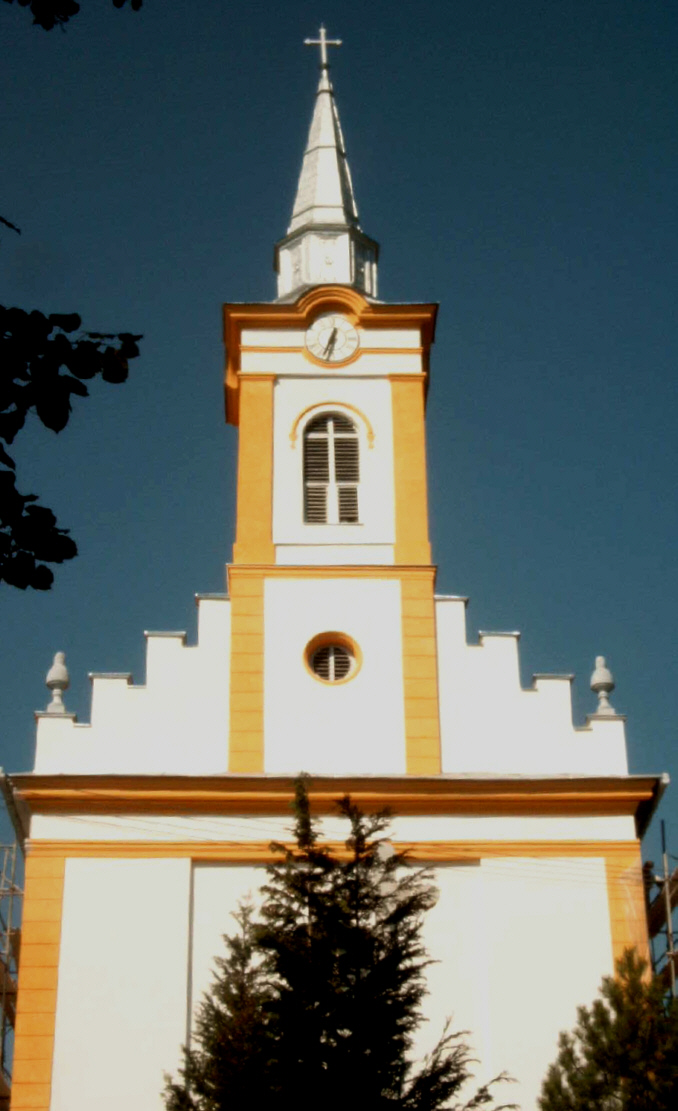
Church in Baranyajenő
