= Tarrós =

- Village (Falva)
- Location in Baranya County Tarrós (Hungary)
- Coordinates: 46°17′N 18°09′E
- Country: Hungary
- County: Baranya
- District: Hegyhát

Area
  - Total: 2.04 sq mi (5.29 km^{2})

Population (2019)
  - Total: 99
  - Density: 48/sq mi (19/km^{2})
- Time zone: UTC+1 (CET)
  - Summer (DST): UTC+2 (CEST)
- Postal code: 7362
- Area code: 72
- NUTS 3: HU231
- HCSO: 15635

Tarrós ([ˈtɒrroːʃ]) is a village (Hungarian: község) in Baranya county, Hungary. Its population at the 2011 census was 129.

== Local government ==
The village is governed by a mayor with a four-person council. The local government of the village operates a joint council office with the nearby localities of Ág, Gerényes, Kisvaszar, Tékes and Vásárosdombó. The seat of the joint council is in Vásárosdombó.

=== Mayors since 1990 ===
Mayor	Party	Term(s) of Office
Bernadett Balázs	Independent	2019-
Bernadett Balázs	Independent	2014-2019
Ernő Valigura	Independent	2010-2014
József Gyula Tóth	Independent	2006-2010
Levente Bagdán	Independent	2002-2006
Zoltánné Wascher	Independent	1998-2002
Zoltánné Wascher	Independent	1994-1998
Zoltán Waschler	Unknown	1990-1994
