= Vázsnok =

- Village (Falva)
- Flag Coat of arms

- Location in Baranya County Vázsnok (Hungary)
- Coordinates: 46°16′N 18°08′E
- Country: Hungary
- County: Baranya
- District: Hegyhát

Government
  - Type: Mayor-council
  - Mayor: József Gombár (Ind.)

Area
  - Total: 4.75 km^{2} (1.83 sq mi)

Population (2021)
  - Total: 134
  - Density: 28.2/km^{2} (73.1/sq mi)
- Time zone: UTC+1 (CET)
  - Summer (DST): UTC+2 (CEST)
- Postal code: 7370
- Area code: 72
- NUTS 3: HU231
- HCSO: 07074

Vázsnok ([ˈvaːʒnok]) is a village (Hungarian: község) in Hegyhát District, northern Baranya county, in the Southern Transdanubia region of Hungary. Its population at the 2011 census was 136.

== Geography ==
The village is located at 46° 16′ 0″ N, 18° 8′ 0″ E. Its area is 4.75 km^{2} (1.83 sq mi). It is part of the Southern Transdanubia statistical region, and administratively it falls under Baranya County and then Hegyhát District. It lies 2 km (1.2 mi) east of the town of Sásd.

== Demographics ==
=== 2011 census ===
As of the census of 2011, there were 136 residents, 54 households, and 34 families living in the village. The population density was 74 inhabitants per square mile (29 inhabitants/km^{2}). There were 59 dwellings at an average density of 32 dwellings per square mile (12 dwellings/km^{2}). The average household size was 2.54. The average number of children was 1.12. The average family size was 2.88.

Religious affiliation was 52.7% Roman Catholic, 0.8% Calvinist, 0.8% Lutheran, and 24.4% unaffiliated, with 21.4% declining to answer.

The village had an ethnic minority Roma population of 2.3%. There were also small numbers of Serbs and Romanians each totaling less than 1% of residents. The vast majority declared themselves as Hungarian (96.2%), with 3.8% declining to answer. (Note: As a person can affiliate themselves with more than one ethnic group (nationality), the totals may be greater than 100%.)

== Local government ==
The village is governed by a mayor with a four-person council. The local government of the village operates a joint council office with the nearby localities of Baranyaszentgyörgy, Felsőegerszeg, Gödre, Meződ, Palé, Sásd and Varga. The seat of the joint council is in Sásd.

== Transportation ==
=== Railway ===
- Sásd Train Station, 2.0 km (1.2 mi) to the west of the village. The station is on the Pusztaszabolcs–Pécs and Dombóvár-Komló railway lines and is operated by MÁV.
