= Felsőegerszeg =

- Village
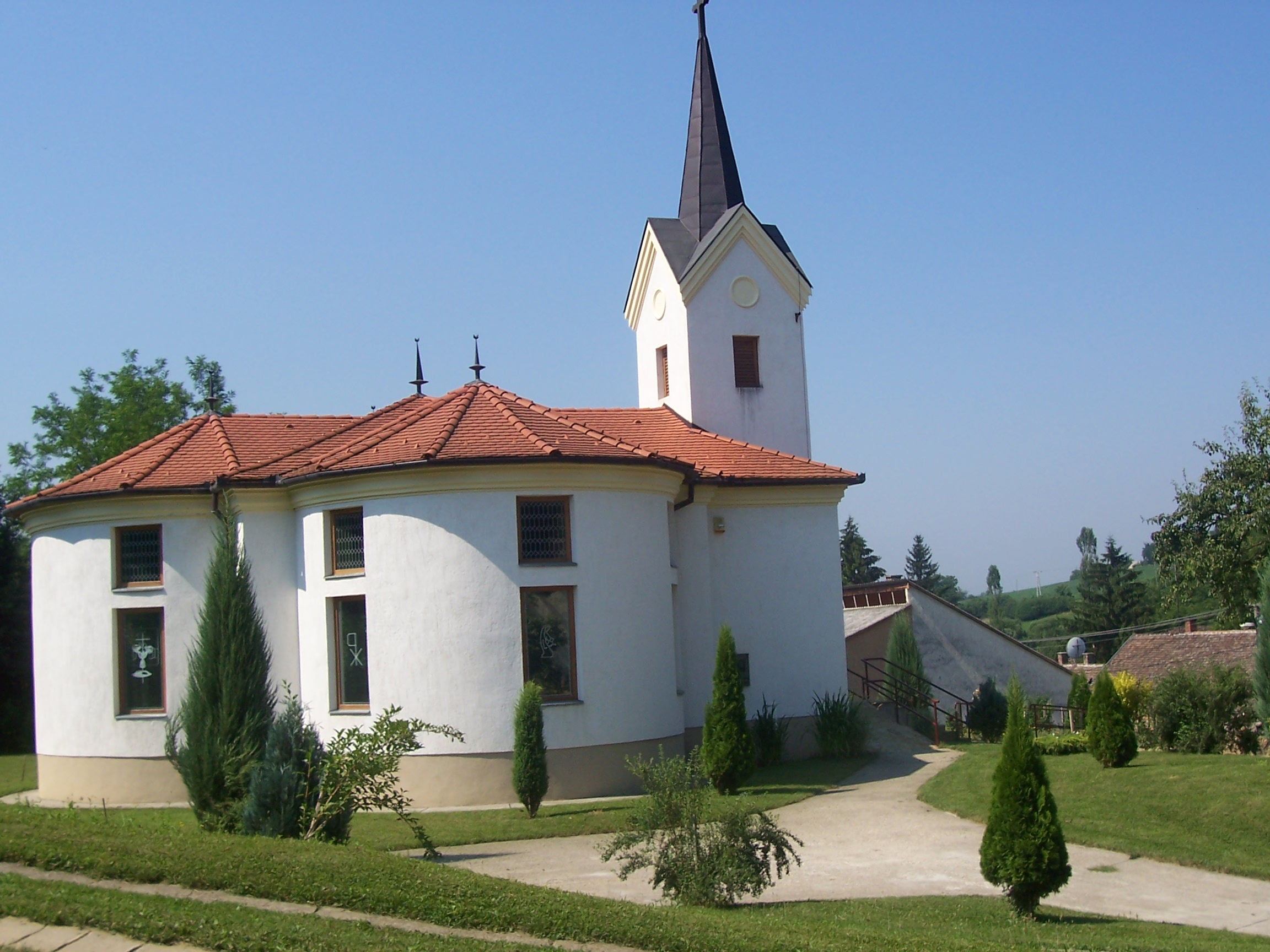

- Seal

- Location in Baranya County Felsőegerszeg (Hungary)
- Coordinates: 46°15′N 18°08′E
- Country: Hungary
- County: Baranya
- District: Hegyhát

Government
  - Type: Mayor-council
  - Mayor: Csabag Herke (Ind.)

Area
  - Total: 4.84 km^{2} (1.87 sq mi)

Population (2021)
  - Total: 108
  - Density: 22.3/km^{2} (57.8/sq mi)
- Time zone: UTC+1 (CET)
  - Summer (DST): UTC+2 (CEST)
- Postal code: 7370
- Area code: 72
- NUTS 3: HU231
- HCSO: 13286

Felsőegerszeg ([ˈfɛlʃøːɛɡɛrsɛɡ] is a village (Hungarian: község) in Hegyhát District, northern Baranya county, in the Southern Transdanubia region of Hungary. Its population at the 2011 census was 131.

== Geography ==
The village is located at 46° 15′ 0″ N, 18° 8′ 0″ E. Its area is 4.84 km^{2} (1.87 sq mi). It is part of the Southern Transdanubia statistical region, and administratively it falls under Baranya County and then Hegyhát District. It lies 2.1 km (1.3 mi) east of the town of Sásd and 21.7 km (13.5 mi) northwest of Pécs.

== Demographics ==
=== 2011 census ===
As of the census of 2011, there were 131 residents, 58 households, and 39 families living in the village. The population density was 70 inhabitants per square mile (27 inhabitants/km^{2}). There were 64 dwellings at an average density of 34 per square mile (13/km^{2}). The average household size was 2.36. The average number of children was 0.87. The average family size was 2.72.

Religious affiliation was 65.0% Roman Catholic, 0.7% Calvinist, 0.7% Greek Catholic, and 20.4% unaffiliated, with 13.1% declining to answer.

The village had an ethnic minority Roma population of 5.8%. A small number of residents also identified as German (0.7%). The vast majority declared themselves as Hungarian (95.6%), with 4.4% declining to answer. (Note: As a person can affiliate themselves with more than one ethnic group (nationality), the totals may be greater than 100%.)

== Local government ==
The village is governed by a mayor with a four-person council. The local government of the village operates a joint council office with the nearby localities of Baranyaszentgyörgy, Gödre, Meződ, Palé, Sásd, Varga and Vázsnok. The seat of the joint council is in Sásd.

== Transportation ==
=== Railway ===
- Sásd Train Station, 2.5 km (1.6 mi) to the west of the village. The station is on the Pusztaszabolcs–Pécs and Dombóvár-Komló railway lines and is operated by MÁV.
