= Kishajmás =

- Village
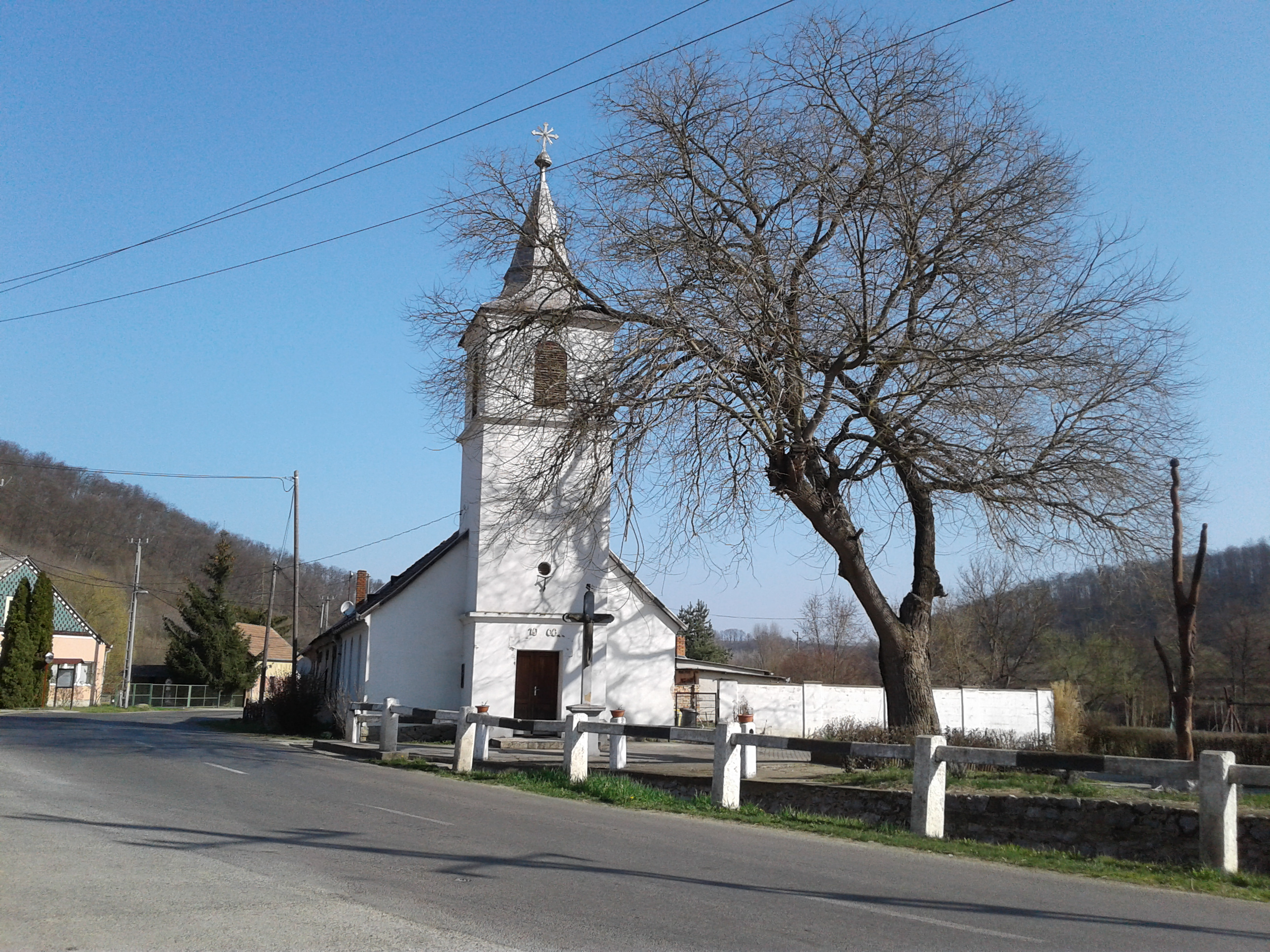

- Seal

- Location in Baranya County Kishajmás (Hungary)
- Coordinates: 46°12′N 18°05′E
- Country: Hungary
- County: Baranya
- District: Hegyhát

Government
  - Type: Mayor-council
  - Mayor: Béla Buchwald (Ind.)

Area
  - Total: 11.76 km^{2} (4.54 sq mi)

Population (2021)
  - Total: 159
  - Density: 13.5/km^{2} (35.0/sq mi)
- Time zone: UTC+1 (CET)
  - Summer (DST): UTC+2 (CEST)
- Postal code: 7391
- Area code: 72
- NUTS 3: HU231
- HCSO: 06831

Kishajmás ([ˈkiʃhɒjmaːʃ], German: Kleinhaimasch) is a village (Hungarian: község) in Hegyhát District, northern Baranya county, in the Southern Transdanubia region of Hungary. Its population at the 2011 census was 209.

== Geography ==
The village is located at 46° 12′ 3″ N, 18° 4′ 56″ E. Its area is 11.76 km^{2} (4.54 sq mi). It is part of the Southern Transdanubia statistical region, and administratively it falls under Baranya County and Hegyhát District. It lies 3.3 km (2.1 mi) south of the village of Mindszentgodisa and 18.5 km (11.5 mi) northwest of Pécs.

== Demographics ==
=== 2011 census ===
As of the census of 2011, there were 209 residents, 82 households, and 52 families living in the village. The population density was 46 inhabitants per square mile (18 inhabitants/km^{2}). There were 93 dwellings at an average density of 20 dwellings per square mile (7.7 dwellings/km^{2}). The average household size was 2.54. The average number of children was 1.42. The average family size was 3.23.

Religious affiliation was 55.8% Roman Catholic, 5.8% Calvinist, 0.5% Lutheran, 0.5% other religion and 13.5% unaffiliated, with 24.0% declining to answer.

The village had an ethnic minority Roma population of 10.6%. A small number of residents also identified as German (0.5%). The majority declared themselves as Hungarian (87.0%), with 13.0% declining to answer. (Note: As a person can affiliate themselves with more than one ethnic group (nationality), the totals may be greater than 100%.)

== Local government ==
The village is governed by a mayor with a four-person council. The local government of the village operates a joint council office with the nearby localities of Bakóca, Baranyajenő, Kisbeszterce, Mindszentgodisa, Szágy, and Tormás. The seat of the joint council is in Mindszentgodisa.

== Transportation ==
=== Railway ===
- Szatina-Kishajmás Train Station, in the village. The station is on the Pusztaszabolcs–Pécs railway line and is operated by MÁV.
