= Baranyaszentgyörgy =

- Village
- Seal

- Location in Baranya County Baranyaszentgyörgy (Hungary)
- Coordinates: 46°14′40″N 18°00′57″E
- Country: Hungary
- County: Baranya
- District: Hegyhát

Government
  - Type: Mayor-council
  - Mayor: János Eizemann (Fidesz-KDNP)

Area
  - Total: 7.27 km^{2} (2.81 sq mi)

Population (2021)
  - Total: 120
  - Density: 17/km^{2} (43/sq mi)
- Time zone: UTC+1 (CET)
  - Summer (DST): UTC+2 (CEST)
- Postal code: 7383
- Area code: 72
- NUTS 3: HU231
- HCSO: 05485

Baranyaszentgyörgy ([ˈbɒrɒɲɒsɛntɟørɟ]) is a village (Hungarian: község) in Hegyhát District, northern Baranya county, in the Southern Transdanubia region of Hungary. Its population at the 2011 census was 141.

== Geography ==
The village is located at 46° 14′ 40″ N, 18° 0′ 57″ E. Its area is 7.27 km^{2} (2.81 sq mi). It is part of the Southern Transdanubia statistical region, and administratively it falls under Baranya County and Hegyhát District. It lies 7 km (4.3 mi) west of the town of Sásd and 25.5 km (15.8 mi) northwest of Pécs.

== Demographics ==
=== 2011 census ===
As of the census of 2011, there were 141 residents, 61 households, and 40 families living in the village. The population density was 50 inhabitants per square mile (19 inhabitants/km^{2}). There were 76 dwellings at an average density of 27 dwellings per square mile (10 dwellings/km^{2}). The average household size was 2.36. The average number of children was 1.03. The average family size was 2.83.

Religious affiliation was 59.0% Roman Catholic, 4.9% Calvinist, 1.4% Lutheran, 1.4% Greek Catholic, 0.7% other religion and 8.3% unaffiliated, with 24.3% declining to answer.

The village had a significant ethnic minority Roma population of 21.6%. A small number of residents also identified as Croat (1.0%). The majority declared themselves as Hungarian (76.5%), with 23.5% declining to answer. (Note: As a person can affiliate themselves with more than one ethnic group (nationality), the totals may be greater than 100%.)

== Local government ==
The village is governed by a mayor with a four-person council. The local government of the village operates a joint council office with the nearby localities of Baranyaszentgyörgy, Gödre, Meződ, Palé, Sásd, Varga and Vázsnok. The seat of the joint council is in Sásd.

== Transportation ==
=== Railway ===
- Sásd Train Station, 10 km (6.2 mi) to the east of the village. The station is on the Pusztaszabolcs–Pécs and Dombóvár-Komló railway lines and is operated by MÁV.
