= Meződ =

- Village
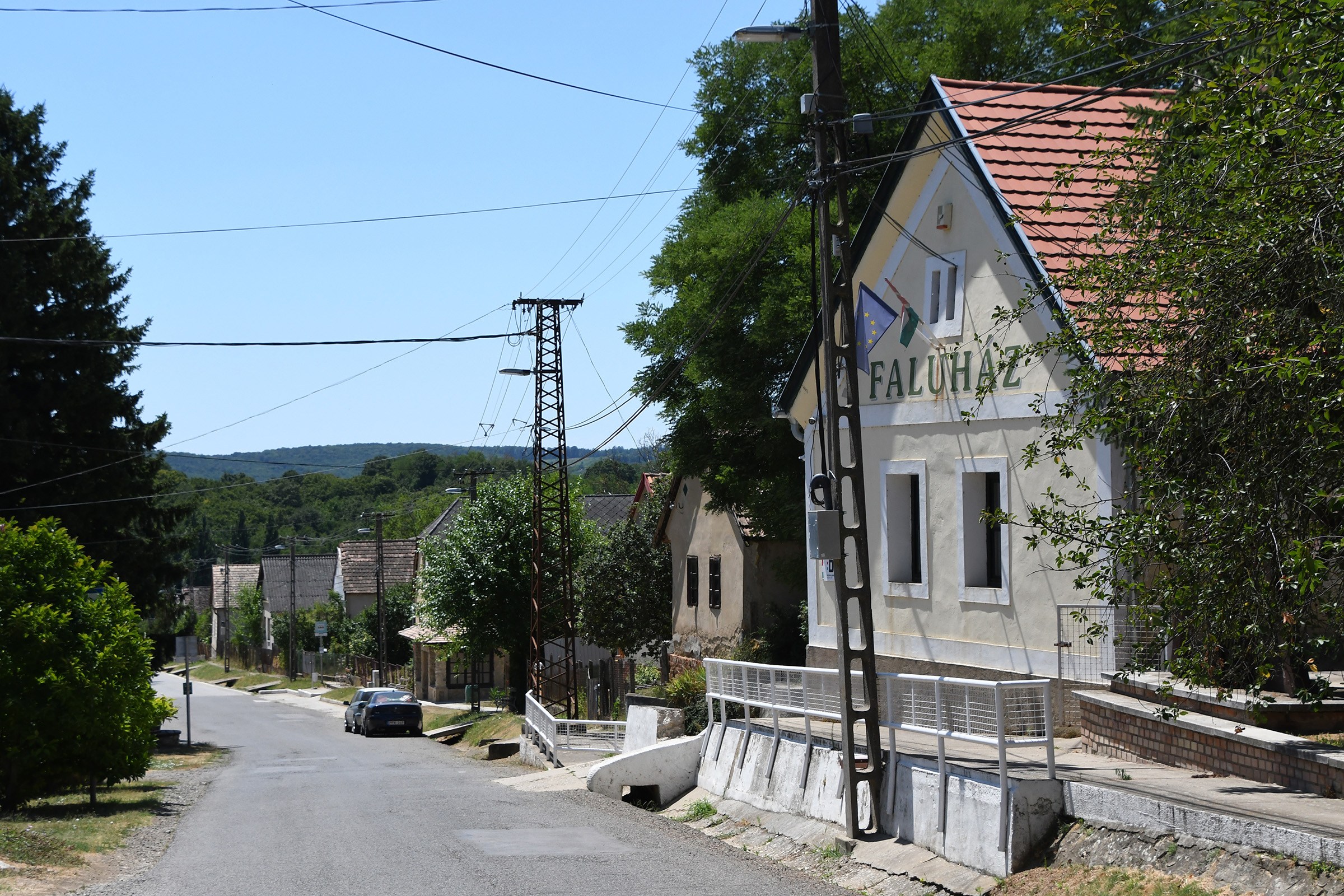

- Location in Baranya County Meződ (Hungary)
- Coordinates: 46°17′N 18°06′E
- Country: Hungary
- County: Baranya
- District: Hegyhát

Government
  - Type: Mayor-council
  - Mayor: Zsolt Merk (Ind.)

Area
  - Total: 10.41 km^{2} (4.02 sq mi)

Population (2021)
  - Total: 123
  - Density: 11.8/km^{2} (30.6/sq mi)
- Time zone: UTC+1 (CET)
  - Summer (DST): UTC+2 (CEST)
- Postal code: 7370
- Area code: 72
- NUTS 3: HU231
- HCSO: 03470

Meződ ([ˈmɛzøːd]) is a village (Hungarian: község) in Hegyhát District, northern Baranya county, in the Southern Transdanubia region of Hungary. Its population at the 2011 census was 137.

== Geography ==
The village is located at 46° 17′ 14″ N, 18° 6′ 4″ E. Its area is 10.41 km^{2} (4.02 sq mi). It is part of the Southern Transdanubia statistical region, and administratively it falls under Baranya County and then Hegyhát District. It lies 3.6 km (2.2 mi) north of the town of Sásd and 26 km (16 mi) northwest of Pécs.

== Demographics ==
=== 2011 census ===
As of the census of 2011, there were 137 residents, 60 households, and 35 families living in the village. The population density was 34 inhabitants per square mile (13/km^{2}). There were 69 dwellings at an average density of 17 per square mile (7/km^{2}). The average household size was 2.23. The average number of children was 1.03. The average family size was 2.91.

Religious affiliation was 63.4% Roman Catholic, 1.5% Calvinist, 0.7% Greek Catholic, 1.5% other religion, and 6.0% unaffiliated, with 26.9% declining to answer.

The village had an ethnic minority Roma population of 7.5%. A small number of residents also identified as German (3.0%), Romanian (0.7%) and other, non-native to Hungary (0.7%). The vast majority declared themselves as Hungarian (94.8%), with 5.2% declining to answer. (Note: As a person can affiliate themselves with more than one ethnic group (nationality), the totals may be greater than 100%.)

== Local government ==
The village is governed by a mayor with a four-person council. The local government of the village operates a joint council office with the nearby localities of Baranyaszentgyörgy, Felsőegerszeg, Gödre, Palé, Sásd, Varga and Vázsnok. The seat of the joint council is in Sásd.

== Transportation ==
=== Railway ===
- Sásd Train Station, 4 km (2.5 mi) to the south of the village. The station is on the Pusztaszabolcs–Pécs and Dombóvár-Komló railway lines and is operated by MÁV.
