= Bakóca =

- Village
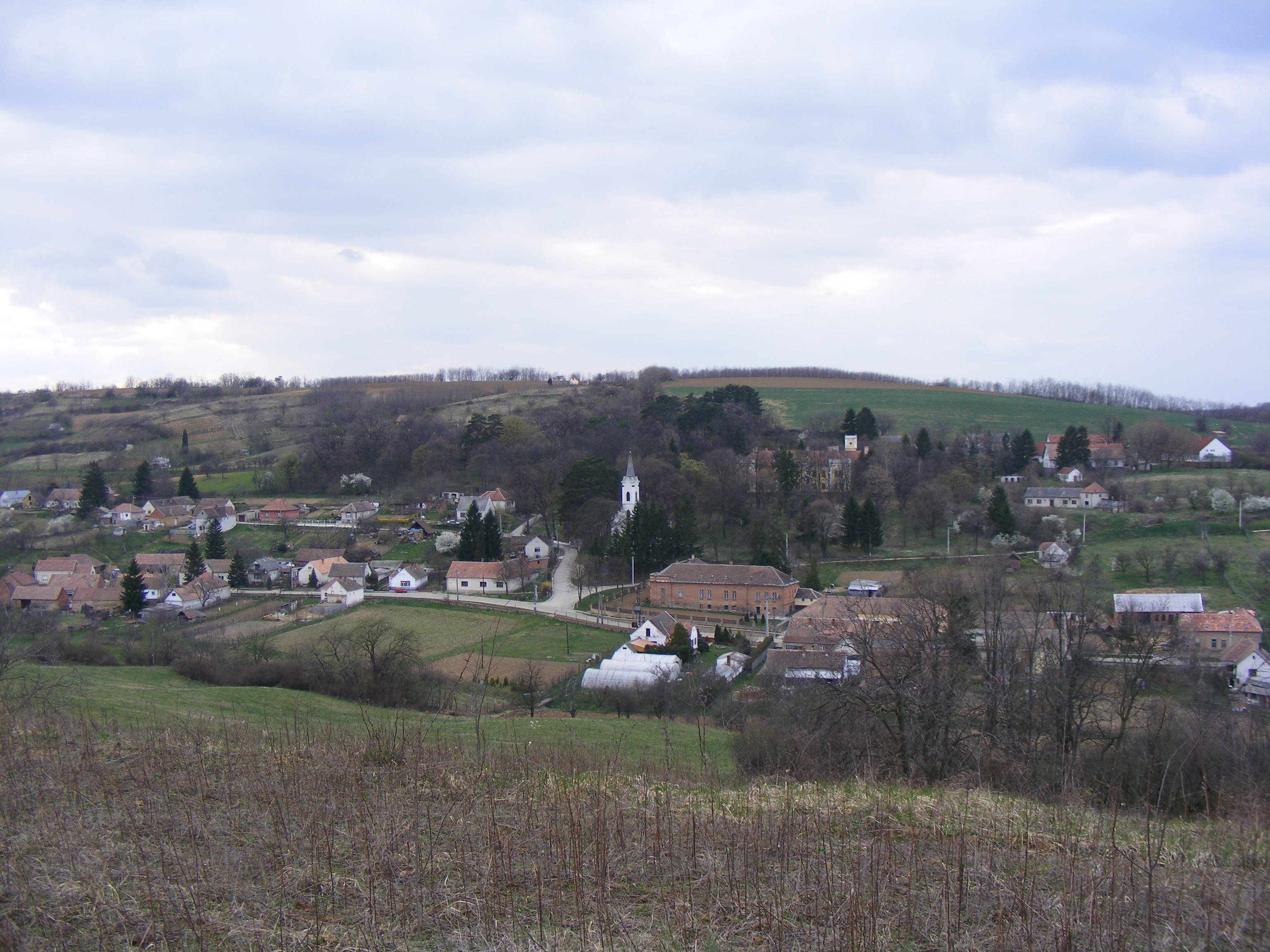

- Seal

- Location in Baranya County Bakóca (Hungary)
- Coordinates: 46°12′27″N 17°59′56″E
- Country: Hungary
- County: Baranya
- District: Hegyhát

Government
  - Type: Mayor-council
  - Mayor: Gábor Király (Ind.)

Area
  - Total: 10.65 km^{2} (4.11 sq mi)

Population (2021)
  - Total: 246
  - Density: 23.1/km^{2} (59.8/sq mi)
- Time zone: UTC+1 (CET)
  - Summer (DST): UTC+2 (CEST)
- Postal code: 7393
- Area code: 72
- NUTS 3: HU231
- HCSO: 22275
- Website: www.bakoca.hu

Bakóca ([ˈbɒkoːtsɒ]) is a village (Hungarian: község) in Hegyhát District, northern Baranya county, in the Southern Transdanubia region of Hungary. Its population at the 2011 census was 285.

== Geography ==
The village is located at 46° 12′ 27″ N, 17° 59′ 56″ E. Its area is 10.65 km^{2} (4.11 sq mi). It is part of the Southern Transdanubia statistical region, and administratively it falls under Baranya County and Hegyhát District. It lies 6 km (3.7 mi) southwest of the village of Mindszentgodisa and 23.6 km (14.7 mi) northwest of Pécs.

== Demographics ==
=== 2011 census ===
As of the census of 2011, there were 285 residents, 121 households, and 80 families living in the village. The population density was 69 inhabitants per square mile (27 inhabitants/km^{2}). There were 134 dwellings at an average density of 33 dwellings per square mile (13 dwellings/km^{2}). The average household size was 2.24. The average number of children was 0.93. The average family size was 2.71.

Religious affiliation was 70.5% Roman Catholic, 4.1% Calvinist, 0.4% Greek Catholic, 2.2% other religion and 12.9% unaffiliated, with 10.0% declining to answer.

The village had an ethnic minority Roma population of 11.1%. A small number of residents also identified as German (0.7%) and other, non-native to Hungary (0.7%). The vast majority declared themselves as Hungarian (96.7%), with 2.6% declining to answer. (Note: As a person can affiliate themselves with more than one ethnic group (nationality), the totals may be greater than 100%.)

== Local government ==
The village is governed by a mayor with a four-person council. The local government of the village operates a joint council office with the nearby localities of Baranyajenő, Kisbeszterce, Kishajmás, Mindszentgodisa, Szágy, and Tormás. The seat of the joint council is in Mindszentgodisa.

As of the election of 2019, the village also has a local minority self-government for its Roma community, with three elected representatives.

== Transportation ==
=== Railway ===
- Godisa Train Station, 8 km (5.0 mi) east of the village. The station is on the Pusztaszabolcs–Pécs and Dombóvár-Komló railway lines and is operated by MÁV.
