= Tormás =

- Village (Falva)
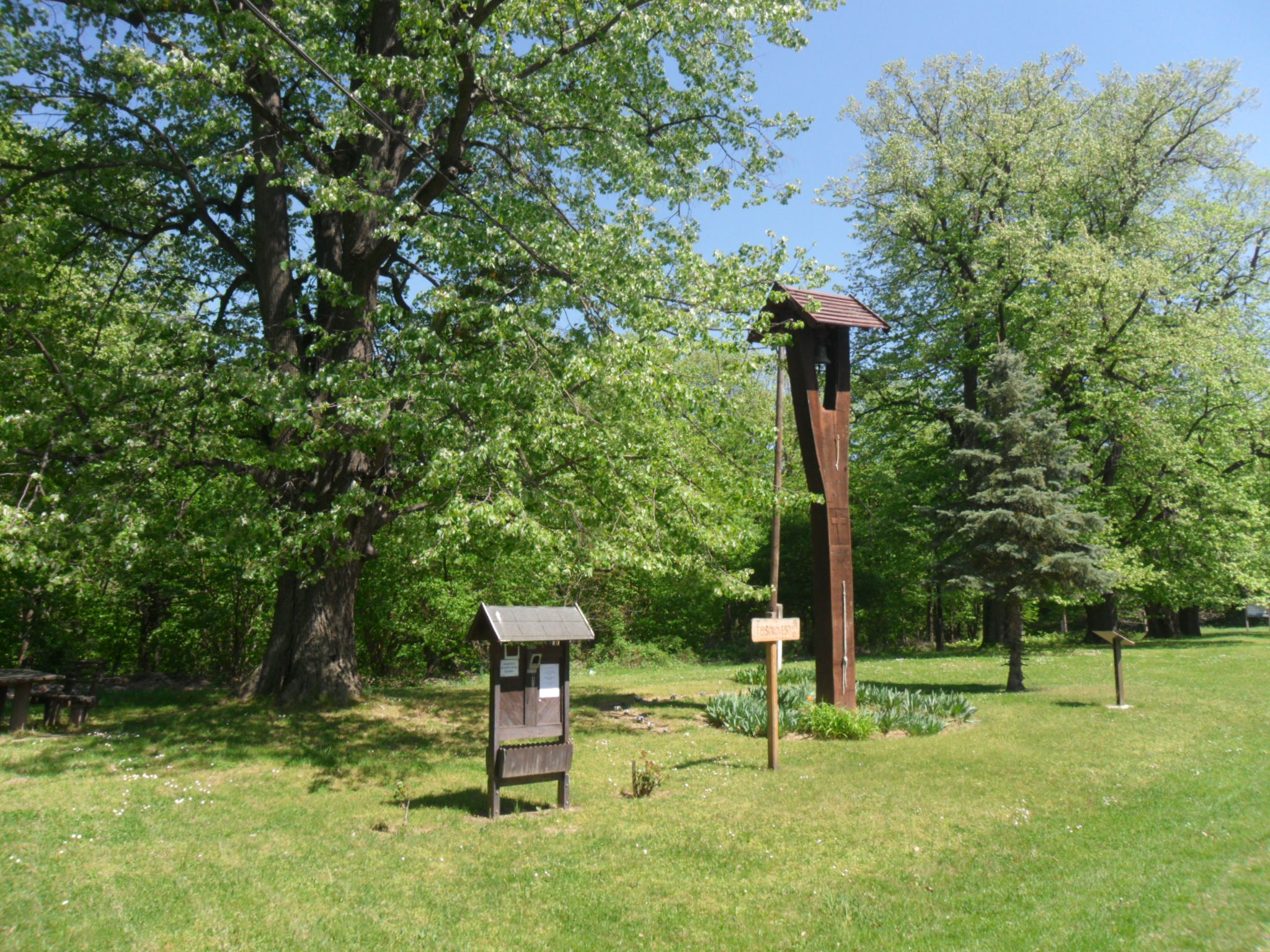

- Seal

- Location in Baranya County Tormás (Hungary)
- Coordinates: 46°13′49″N 17°59′29″E
- Country: Hungary
- County: Baranya
- District: Hegyhát

Government
  - Type: Mayor-council
  - Mayor: József Bagány (Ind.)

Area
  - Total: 24.70 km^{2} (9.54 sq mi)

Population (2021)
  - Total: 226
  - Density: 9.15/km^{2} (23.7/sq mi)
- Time zone: UTC+1 (CET)
  - Summer (DST): UTC+2 (CEST)
- Postal code: 7383
- Area code: 72
- NUTS 3: HU231
- HCSO: 22424

Tormás ([ˈtormaːʃ], German: Krendorf) is a village (Hungarian: község) in Hegyhát District, northern Baranya county, in the Southern Transdanubia region of Hungary. Its population at the 2011 census was 301.

== Geography ==
The village is located at 46° 13′ 49″ N, 17° 59′ 29″ E. Its area is 24.70 km^{2} (9.54 sq mi). It is part of the Southern Transdanubia statistical region, and administratively it falls under Baranya County and then Hegyhát District. It lies 6.1 km (3.8 mi) west of the town of Mindszentgodisa and 25.7 km (16.0 mi) northwest of Pécs.

== Demographics ==
=== 2011 census ===
As of the census of 2011, there were 301 residents, 110 households, and 78 families living in the village. The population density was 32 inhabitants per square mile (12 inhabitants/km^{2}). There were 124 dwellings at an average density of 13 per square mile (5.0/km^{2}). The average household size was 2.71. The average number of children was 1.29. The average family size was 3.13.

Religious affiliation was 75.8% Roman Catholic, 3.7% Calvinist, 0.3% other religion, and 7.4% unaffiliated, with 12.8% declining to answer.

The village had significant ethnic minority Roma (22.1%) and German (17.4%) populations. A small number of residents also identified as Romanian (0.3%). All residents identified as Hungarian. (Note: As a person can affiliate themselves with more than one ethnic group (nationality), the totals may be greater than 100%.)

== Local government ==
The village is governed by a mayor with a four-person council. The local government of the village operates a joint council office with the nearby localities of Bakóca, Baranyajenő, Kisbeszterce, Kishajmás, Mindszentgodisa, and Szágy. The seat of the joint council is in Mindszentgodisa.

As of the election of 2019, the village also has local minority self-governments for its Roma and German communities, each with three elected representatives.

== Transportation ==
=== Railway ===
- Sásd Train Station, 12 km (7.5 mi) to the northeast of the village. The station is on the Pusztaszabolcs–Pécs and Dombóvár-Komló railway lines and is operated by MÁV.
