= Alsómocsolád =

- Village
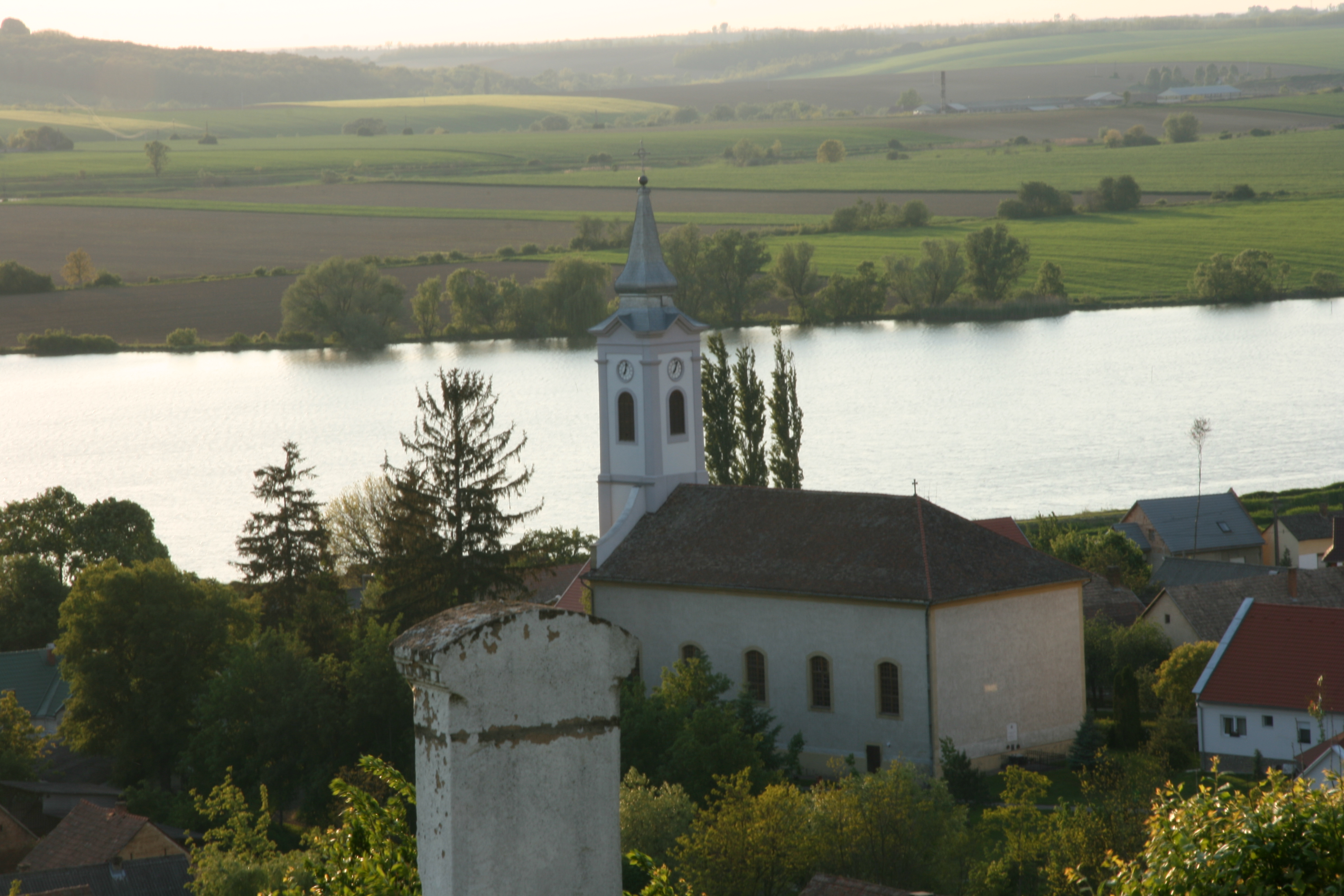

- Flag Seal

- Location in Baranya County Alsómocsolád (Hungary)
- Coordinates: 46°18′48″N 18°14′39″E
- Country: Hungary
- County: Baranya
- District: Hegyhát

Government
  - Type: Mayor-council
  - Mayor: László Dicső (Ind.)

Area
  - Total: 13.00 km^{2} (5.02 sq mi)

Population (2021)
  - Total: 281
  - Density: 21.6/km^{2} (56.0/sq mi)
- Time zone: UTC+1 (CET)
  - Summer (DST): UTC+2 (CEST)
- Postal code: 7345
- Area code: 72
- NUTS 3: HU231
- HCSO: 17385
- Website: www.alsomocsolad.hu

Alsómocsolád ([ˈɒlʃoːmotʃolaːd], German: Metschelad, Mutschlak, Croatian: Močilag) is a village (Hungarian: község) in Hegyhát District, northern Baranya county, in the Southern Transdanubia region of Hungary. Its population at the 2011 census was 303.

== Geography ==
The village is located at 46° 18′ 48″ N, 18° 14′ 39″ E. Its area is 13 km^{2} (5.0 sq mi). It is part of the Southern Transdanubia statistical region, and administratively it falls under Baranya County and Hegyhát District. It lies 3.9 km (2.4 mi) south of the town of Mágocs and 26.9 km (16.7 mi) north of Pécs.

== Demographics ==
=== 2011 census ===
As of the census of 2011, there were 303 residents, 110 households, and 78 families living in the village. The population density was 61 inhabitants per square mile (24 inhabitants/km^{2}). There were 140 dwellings at an average density of 28 dwellings per square mile (11 dwellings/km^{2}). The average household size was 2.43. The average number of children was 1.01. The average family size was 2.82.

Religious affiliation was 66.9% Roman Catholic, 2.3% Calvinist, 1.3% Lutheran, and 28.3% unaffiliated, with 1.3% declining to answer.

The village had an ethnic minority German population of 7.1% and a Roma population of 2.3%. A small number of residents also identified as Croat (0.3%) and other, non-native to Hungary (2.6%). The vast majority declared themselves as Hungarian (97.1%), with 0.3% declining to answer. (Note: As a person can affiliate themselves with more than one ethnic group (nationality), the totals may be greater than 100%.)

== Local government ==
The village is governed by a mayor with a four-person council. The local government of the village operates a joint council office with the nearby localities of Mágocs, Mekényes, and Nagyhajmás. The seat of the joint council is in Mágocs.

== Transportation ==
=== Railway ===
- Mágocs-Alsómocsolád Train Station, 2.6 km (1.6 mi) west of the village. The station is on the Dombóvár-Bátaszék railway line and is operated by MÁV.
