= Mekényes =

- Village
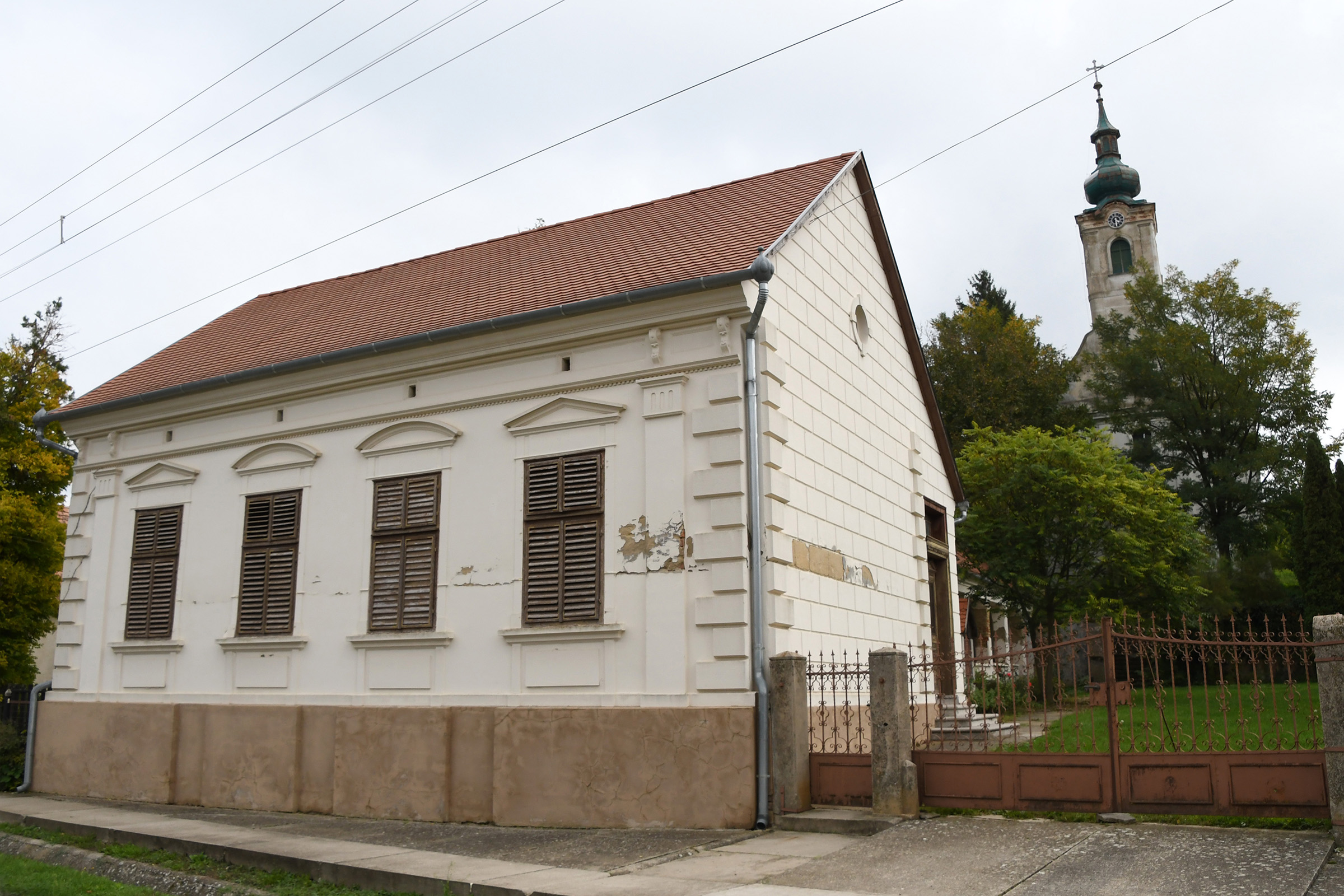

- Seal

- Location in Baranya County Mekényes (Hungary)
- Coordinates: 46°23′21″N 18°20′57″E
- Country: Hungary
- County: Baranya
- District: Hegyhát

Government
  - Type: Mayor-council
  - Mayor: Róbert Schild (Ind.)

Area
  - Total: 17.77 km^{2} (6.86 sq mi)

Population (2021)
  - Total: 262
  - Density: 14.7/km^{2} (38.2/sq mi)
- Time zone: UTC+1 (CET)
  - Summer (DST): UTC+2 (CEST)
- Postal code: 7344
- Area code: 72
- NUTS 3: HU231
- HCSO: 30492
- Website: www.mekenyes.hu

Mekényes ([ˈmɛkeːɲɛʃ], German: Meknitsch, Croatian: Mekinjiš, Mekinjaš) is a village (Hungarian: község) in Hegyhát District, northern Baranya county, in the Southern Transdanubia region of Hungary. Its population at the 2011 census was 289.

== Geography ==
The village is located at 46° 23′ 21″ N, 18° 20′ 57″ E. Its area is 17.77 km^{2} (6.86 sq mi). It is part of the Southern Transdanubia statistical region, and administratively it falls under Baranya County and Hegyhát District. It lies 8.8 km (5.5 mi) northeast of the town of Mágocs and 36 km (22 mi) north of Pécs.

== Demographics ==
=== 2011 census ===
As of the census of 2011, there were 289 residents, 121 households, and 82 families living in the village. The population density was 42 inhabitants per square mile (16 inhabitants/km^{2}). There were 143 dwellings at an average density of 21 dwellings per square mile (8.1 dwellings/km^{2}). The average household size was 2.36. The average number of children was 0.85. The average family size was 2.82.

Religious affiliation was 43.2% Roman Catholic, 12.6% Lutheran, 5.6% Calvinist, 0.4% Greek Catholic, 1.4% other religion and 6.3% unaffiliated, with 30.5% declining to answer.

The village had an ethnic minority German population of 7.7% and a Roma population of 2.1%. A small number of residents also identified as Romanian (1.1%) and other, non-native to Hungary (1.4%). The majority declared themselves as Hungarian (71.2%), with 27.4% declining to answer. (Note: As a person can affiliate themselves with more than one ethnic group (nationality), the totals may be greater than 100%.)

== Local government ==
The village is governed by a mayor with a four-person council. The local government of the village operates a joint council office with the nearby localities of Alsómocsolád, Mágocs, and Nagyhajmás. The seat of the joint council is in Mágocs.

== Transportation ==
=== Railway ===
- Kurd Train Station, 9 km (5.6 mi) north of the village. The station is on the Pusztaszabolcs–Pécs railway line and is operated by MÁV.
