= Nagyhajmás =

- Village
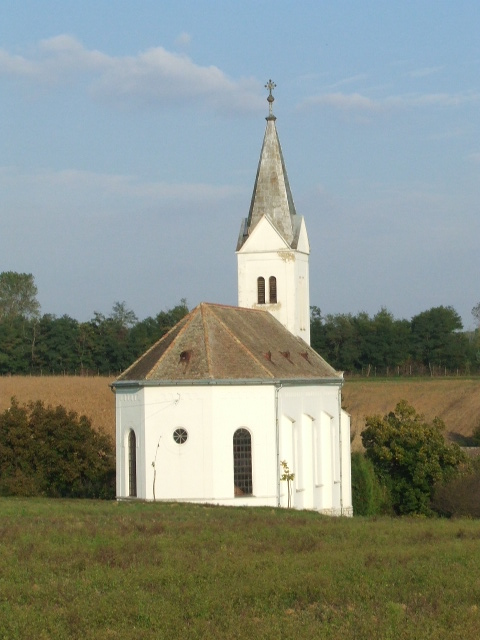

- Seal

- Location in Baranya County Nagyhajmás (Hungary)
- Coordinates: 46°22′22″N 18°17′20″E
- Country: Hungary
- County: Baranya
- District: Hegyhát

Government
  - Type: Mayor-council
  - Mayor: Norbert András Molnár (Ind.)

Area
  - Total: 18.01 km^{2} (6.95 sq mi)

Population (2021)
  - Total: 253
  - Density: 14.0/km^{2} (36.4/sq mi)
- Time zone: UTC+1 (CET)
  - Summer (DST): UTC+2 (CEST)
- Postal code: 7343
- Area code: 72
- NUTS 3: HU231
- HCSO: 12858
- Website: www.nagyhajmas.hu

Nagyhajmás ([ˈnɒɟhɒjmaːʃ], German: Heimasch, Croatian: Hajmaš) is a village (Hungarian: község) in the Hegyhát District, northern Baranya county, in the Southern Transdanubia region of Hungary. Its population at the 2011 census was 346.

== Geography ==
The village is located at 46° 22′ 22″ N, 18° 17′ 20″ E. Its area is 18.01 km^{2} (6.95 sq mi). It is part of the Southern Transdanubia statistical region, and administratively it falls under Baranya County and Hegyhát District. It lies 5.3 km (3.3 mi) northeast of the town of Mágocs and 34.2 km (21.3 mi) north of Pécs.

== Demographics ==
=== 2011 census ===
As of the census of 2011, there were 346 residents, 129 households, and 96 families living in the village. The population density was 50 inhabitants per square mile (19 inhabitants/km^{2}). There were 142 dwellings at an average density of 20 dwellings per square mile (7.7 dwellings/km^{2}). The average household size was 2.64. The average number of children was 1.19. The average family size was 3.02.

Religious affiliation was 41.8% Roman Catholic, 11.2% Lutheran, 2.9% Calvinist, 0.3% Jewish, 0.6% other religion and 26.8% unaffiliated, with 16.5% declining to answer.

The village had an ethnic minority Roma population of 15.9% and a German population of 8.5%. A small number of residents also identified as Serb (0.3%) and other, non-native to Hungary (0.3%). The vast majority declared themselves as Hungarian (96.2%), with 3.5% declining to answer. (Note: As a person can affiliate themselves with more than one ethnic group (nationality), the totals may be greater than 100%.)

== Local government ==
The village is governed by a mayor with a four-person council. The local government of the village operates a joint council office with the nearby localities of Alsómocsolád, Mágocs, and Mekényes. The seat of the joint council is in Mágocs.

As of the election of 2019, the village also has local minority self-governments for its German and Roma communities, each with three elected representatives.

== Transportation ==
=== Railway ===
- Mágocs-Alsómocsolád Train Station, 11 km (6.8 mi) southwest of the village. The station is on the Dombóvár-Bátaszék railway line and is operated by MÁV.
