= Palé, Hungary =

Palé
- Village
- Seal

- Location in Baranya County Palé (Hungary)
- Coordinates: 46.26056°N 18.07031°E
- Country: Hungary
- County: Baranya
- District: Hegyhát

Government
  - Type: Mayor-council
  - Mayor: Tímea Markóné Héder (Ind.)

Area
  - Total: 2.15 km^{2} (0.83 sq mi)

Population (2021)
  - Total: 95
  - Density: 44/km^{2} (110/sq mi)
- Time zone: UTC+1 (CET)
  - Summer (DST): UTC+2 (CEST)
- Postal code: 7370
- Area code: 72
- NUTS 3: HU231
- HCSO: 23764

Palé ([ˈpɒleː]) is a village (Hungarian: község) in Hegyhát District, northern Baranya county, in the Southern Transdanubia region of Hungary. Its population at the 2011 census was 99.

== Geography ==
The village is located at 46° 15′ 38″ N, 18° 4′ 13″ E. Its area is 2.15 km^{2} (0.83 sq mi). It is part of the Southern Transdanubia statistical region, and administratively it falls under Baranya County and then Hegyhát District. It lies 3 km (1.9 mi) west of the town of Sásd.

== Demographics ==
=== 2011 census ===
As of the census of 2011, there were 99 residents, 34 households, and 28 families living in the village. The population density was 119 inhabitants per square mile (46 inhabitants/km^{2}). There were 37 dwellings at an average density of 45 per square mile (17/km^{2}). The average household size was 2.74. The average number of children was 1.07. The average family size was 2.93.

Religious affiliation was 44.1% Roman Catholic, 5.4% Calvinist, 8.6% other religion, and 15.1% unaffiliated, with 26.9% declining to answer.

The village had an ethnic minority Roma population of 5.4%. A small number of residents also identified as German (1.1%). The vast majority declared themselves as Hungarian (98.9%), with 1.1% declining to answer. (Note: As a person can affiliate themselves with more than one ethnic group (nationality), the totals may be greater than 100%.)

== Local government ==
The village is governed by a mayor with a four-person council. The local government of the village operates a joint council office with the nearby localities of Baranyaszentgyörgy, Felsőegerszeg, Gödre, Meződ, Sásd, Varga and Vázsnok. The seat of the joint council is in Sásd.

== Transportation ==
=== Railway ===
- Sásd Train Station, 3.5 km (2.2 mi) to the east of the village. The station is on the Pusztaszabolcs–Pécs and Dombóvár-Komló railway lines and is operated by MÁV.
