= Kisbeszterce =

- Village
- Seal

- Location in Baranya County Kisbeszterce (Hungary)
- Coordinates: 46°12′23.18″N 18°02′5.28″E
- Country: Hungary
- County: Baranya
- District: Hegyhát

Government
  - Type: Mayor-council
  - Mayor: Róbert Sándor Szücs (Ind.)

Area
  - Total: 7.47 km^{2} (2.88 sq mi)

Population (2021)
  - Total: 75
  - Density: 10/km^{2} (26/sq mi)
- Time zone: UTC+1 (CET)
  - Summer (DST): UTC+2 (CEST)
- Postal code: 7391
- Area code: 72
- NUTS 3: HU231
- HCSO: 05722

Kisbeszterce ([ˈkiʃbɛstɛrtsɛ]) is a village (Hungarian: község) in Hegyhát District, northern Baranya county, in the Southern Transdanubia region of Hungary. Its population at the 2011 census was 89.

== Geography ==
The village is located at 46° 12′ 23″ N, 18° 2′ 5″ E. Its area is 7.47 km^{2} (2.88 sq mi). It is part of the Southern Transdanubia statistical region, and administratively it falls under Baranya County and Hegyhát District. It lies 4.1 km (2.5 mi) southwest of the village of Mindszentgodisa and 21.2 km (13.2 mi) northwest of Pécs.

== Demographics ==
=== 2011 census ===
As of the census of 2011, there were 89 residents, 35 households, and 25 families living in the village. The population density was 31 inhabitants per square mile (12/km^{2}). There were 36 dwellings at an average density of 13 per square mile (5/km^{2}). The average household size was 2.40. The average number of children was 0.96. The average family size was 2.80.

Religious affiliation was 92.9% Roman Catholic and 6.0% unaffiliated, with 1.2% declining to answer.

The village had an ethnic minority Roma population of 4.8%. All residents declared themselves as Hungarian (100%). (Note: As a person can affiliate themselves with more than one ethnic group (nationality), the totals may be greater than 100%.)

== Local government ==
The village is governed by a mayor with a two-person council. The local government of the village operates a joint council office with the nearby localities of Bakóca, Baranyajenő, Kishajmás, Mindszentgodisa, Szágy, and Tormás. The seat of the joint council is in Mindszentgodisa.

== Transportation ==
=== Railway ===
- Godisa Train Station, 8 km (5.0 mi) northeast of the village. The station is on the Pusztaszabolcs–Pécs and Dombóvár-Komló railway lines and is operated by MÁV.
