= Gerényes =

- Village
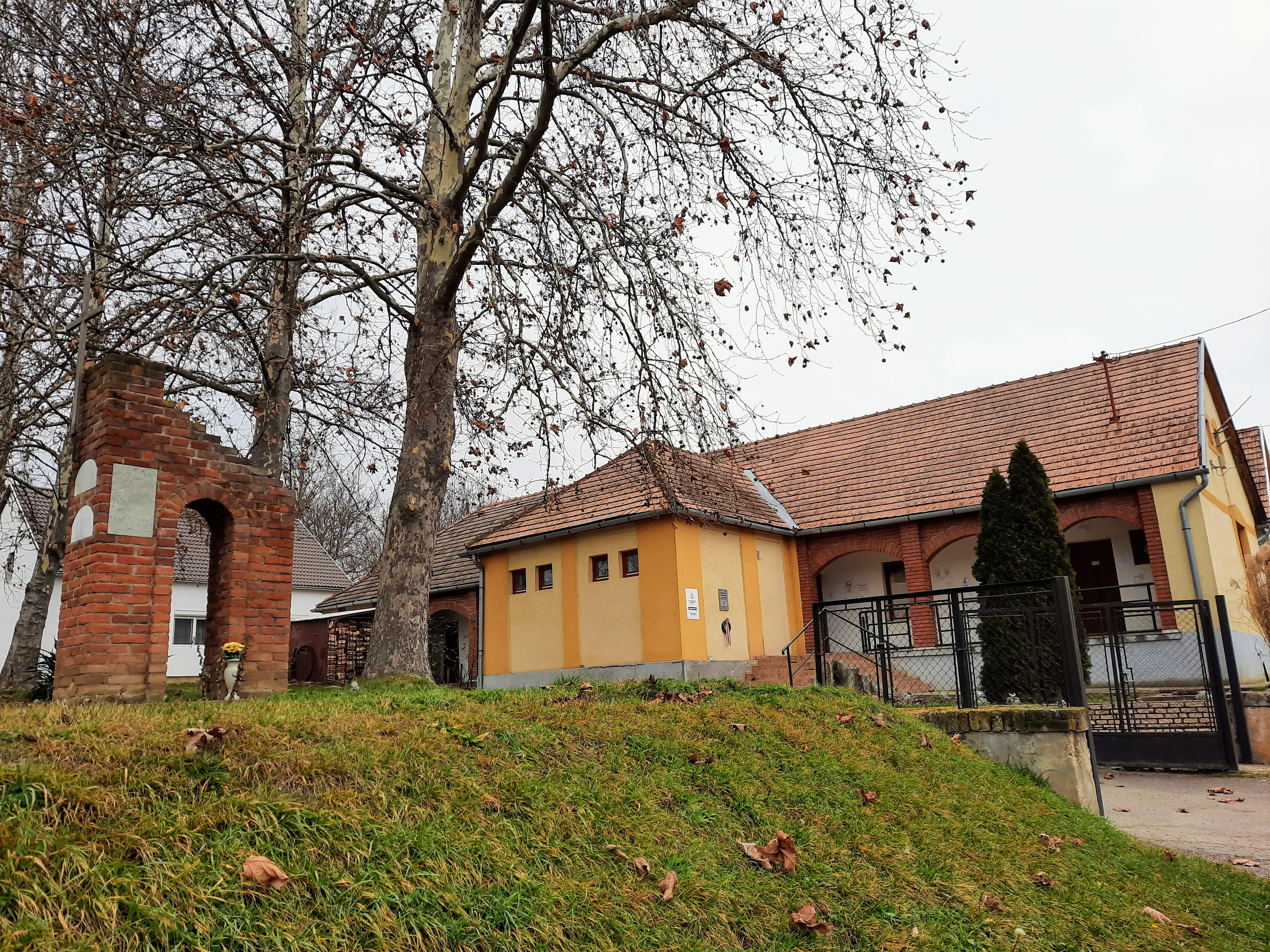
- A former church, now medical office in Gerényes.
- Interactive map of Gerényes
- Coordinates: 46°18′N 18°11′E
- Country: Hungary
- County: Baranya
- Time zone: UTC+1 (CET)
  - Summer (DST): UTC+2 (CEST)

Gerényes is a village in Baranya county, Hungary.
