= Mindszentgodisa =

- Location of Baranya county in Hungary

- Location of Mindszentgodisa
- Coordinates: 46.22896°N 18.07046°E
- Country: Hungary
- County: Baranya

Area
  - Total: 22.97 km^{2} (8.87 sq mi)

Population (2004)
  - Total: 1,011
  - Density: 44.01/km^{2} (114.0/sq mi)
- Time zone: UTC+1 (CET)
  - Summer (DST): UTC+2 (CEST)
- Postal code: 7391
- Area code: 72

Mindszentgodisa is a village in Baranya county, Hungary.
