= Sásd =

- Town
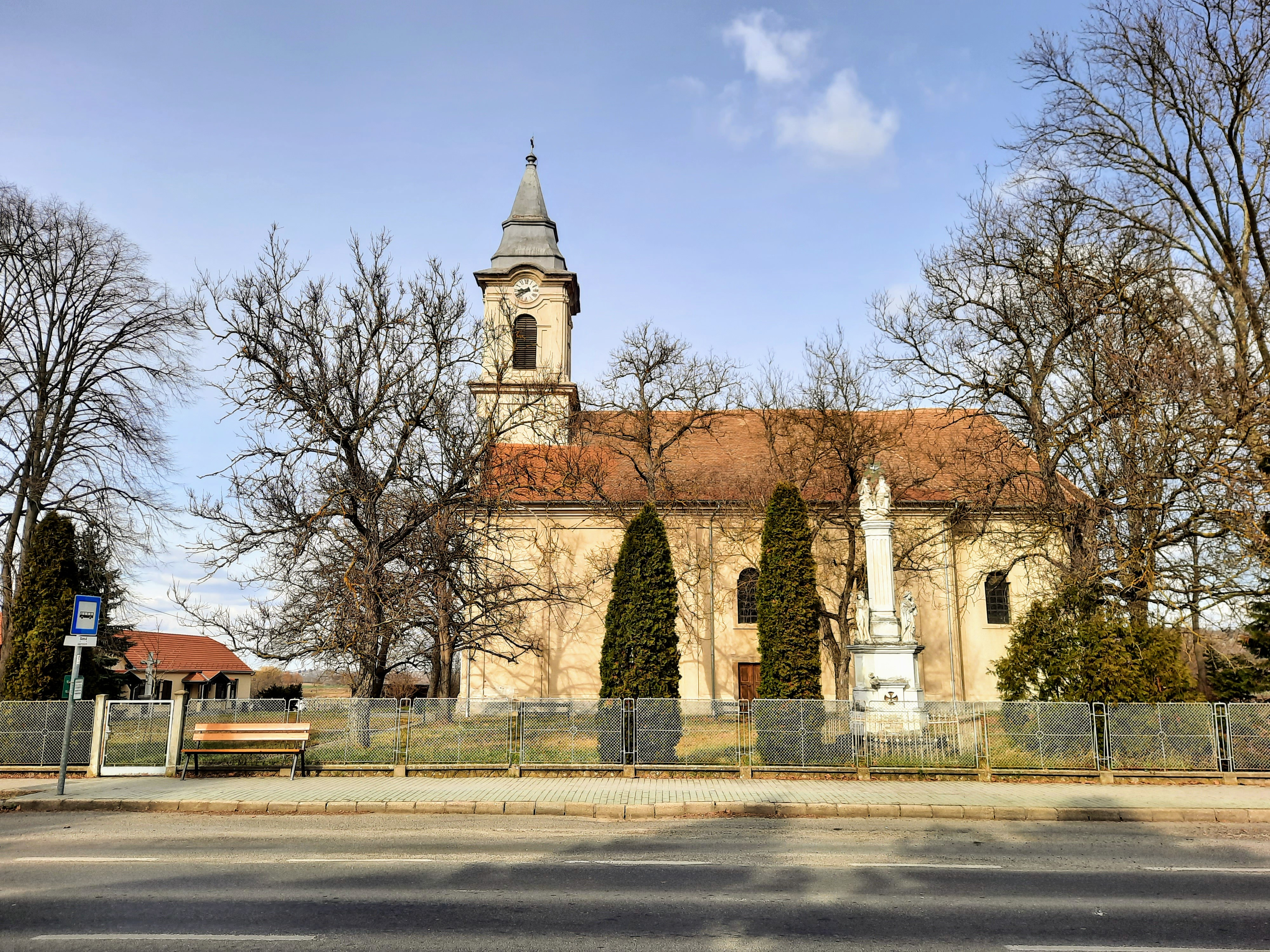

- Flag Coat of arms

- Location of Sásd
- Coordinates: 46.25457°N 18.10598°E
- Country: Hungary
- County: Baranya
- District: Hegyhát

Area
  - Total: 14.88 km^{2} (5.75 sq mi)

Population (2015)
  - Total: 3,094
  - Density: 207.9/km^{2} (538.5/sq mi)
- Time zone: UTC+1 (CET)
  - Summer (DST): UTC+2 (CEST)
- Postal code: 7370
- Area code: (+36) 72
- Website: www.sasd.hu

Sásd (Croatian: Šaš) is a town in Baranya county, in southern Hungary. The total population of Sásd in 2015 was 3,094.

== Twin towns – sister cities ==
Sásd is twinned with:

- Izvoru Crișului, Romania
- Raaba, Austria
- Mogilany, Poland
