= Evangelical-Lutheran Church in Hungary =

Protestant Lutheran denomination in Hungary

- Magyarországi Evangélikus Egyház
- Classification: Protestant
- Orientation: Lutheran
- Polity: Episcopal
- Region: Hungary
- Origin: 16th century
- Congregations: 500
- Members: 176,000
- Official website: www.evangelikus.hu

The Evangelical-Lutheran Church in Hungary (ELCH; Hungarian: Magyarországi Evangélikus Egyház) is a Protestant Lutheran denomination in Hungary. In 2019, there were 176,000 baptized members.

The church has three dioceses, with nearly 300 parishes and 500 places of worship in Hungary, and is the third largest Christian denomination in Hungary. It is currently led by Presiding Bishop János Szemerei.

== History ==
Lutheranism arrived early in the Kingdom of Hungary, but was repressed by the Roman Catholic Habsburg dynasty. During the "Mourning Decade" (1671–1681) Hungarian Lutherans, along with the Reformed Church in Hungary, were severely persecuted. There was a renewal with Pietism, and the Deed of Tolerance issued by King Joseph II in 1781 granted religious freedom. Protestant churches were fully recognized after the restoration of the sovereignty of Hungary in 1867.

== Structure ==
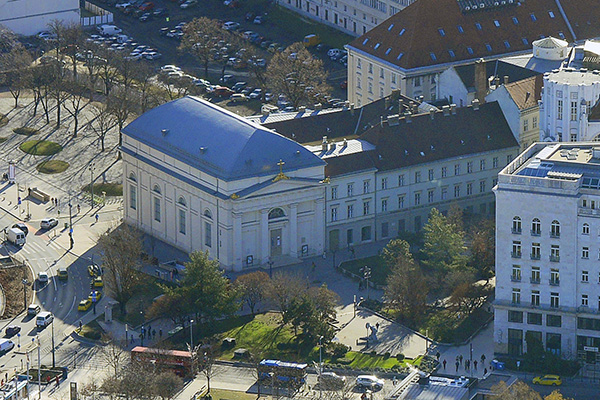
The church (1799–1808) on Deák Ferenc tér is the oldest and best-known Lutheran church in Budapest

The Evangelical-Lutheran Church in Hungary consists of three dioceses, each led by a bishop:

- Northern Diocese (Északi Evangélikus Egyházkerület)
- Southern Diocese (Déli Evangélikus Egyházkerület)
- Western (Transdanubian) Diocese (Nyugati (Dunántúli) Evangélikus Egyházkerület)

One diocesan bishop is elected to head the national church as Presiding Bishop. The three bishops in office are Presiding Bishop János Szemerei (Western/Transdanubian Diocese), Tamás Fabiny (Northern Diocese) and Péter Kondor (Southern Diocese). The highest decision making body is the Synod, which consists of all the bishops, plus representatives (both lay and ordained) from each diocese.

== Education ==
The ELCH has an extensive educational programme. This includes seminary training for its ordination candidates, lay training programmes for its local and regional lay leaders, a network of 46 schools covering age ranges from nursery education to secondary school, and three higher education institutions (colleges and universities).

== Affiliations ==
The church is member of the World Council of Churches, the Conference of European Churches, Ecumenical Council of Churches in Hungary, the Lutheran World Federation, and the Community of Protestant Churches in Europe.

== Internal tensions ==
Differences over the interpretation of Scripture, marriage, and sexual ethics within the ELCH led to public controversy in the fall of 2026. The immediate catalyst was a 21 October 2026 presentation at Fasor Lutheran Church of Swedish Lutheran pastor Johanna Wikberg’s book Christian and Gay: How Is That Possible? Critics of the event argued that the involvement of church officials and theology faculty members provided a platform for an interpretation of Scripture supporting the acceptance of same-sex relationships.

The church’s Council of Bishops addressed the book presentation in its Reformation letter, dated 28 October and published on 30 October. Bishops Pál Keczkó, Péter Kondor, and János Szemerei emphasized that the views expressed at the event differed from the church’s official positions and practices, which remained unchanged, and could therefore have created the mistaken impression that the church had changed course. They also stressed the importance of dialogue between different theological positions and proposed establishing a working group in which representatives of differing views could jointly examine the issues raised.

On 10 November 2026, Lutheran pastors and church members, joined by members of other denominations, published an open letter to the church’s bishops entitled In the Same Church, but Sharing the Same Faith? Referring also to their earlier statement from 2021, the organizers maintained that doctrinal disagreements within the church had remained unresolved. They characterized the conflict as a dispute concerning the authority of Scripture, ordination vows, and the binding authority of the Lutheran confessions, extending beyond differences over sexual ethics.

The letter requested a public response from the bishops to nine questions. These concerned the authority of Scripture, the understanding of marriage as a covenant between a man and a woman, the moral assessment of same-sex sexual relationships, the blessing of such relationships, and the ordination of people in same-sex relationships. The signatories also called for clarification of the consequences of departing from church teaching. Citing Article VII of the Augsburg Confession, they questioned whether church unity could be maintained while fundamentally contradictory teachings coexisted.

The organizers stated that they did not seek to cause a schism, but would not place the preservation of organizational unity above faithfulness to Scripture and the gospel. Depending on the responses, they intended to consider how they could continue their pastoral and congregational ministries. The full text of the open letter and the list of signatories were published on the Együttállók website.

== See also ==
- List of Lutheran dioceses and archdioceses
