= Germans of Hungary =

Ethnic minority in Hungary

Magyarországi németek Ungarndeutsche
- The flag of the German minority in Hungary

Total population
- 142,551 (2022)

Regions with significant populations
- Hungary
- Pest County: 24,994
- Baranya County: 22,150
- Budapest: 18,278
- Tolna County: 10,195
- Bács-Kiskun County: 9,528
- Komárom-Esztergom County: 9,168
- Veszprém County: 8,473
- Fejér County: 5,419
- Győr-Moson-Sopron County: 5,145
- Somogy County: 3,039

Languages
- Hungarian, German

Religion
- Roman Catholic majority, Protestant minority

Related ethnic groups
- Danube Swabians, Germans (in particular Swabians)
- Lived in Hungary (formerly the Kingdom of Hungary) since the Middle Ages onwards.

German Hungarians (German: Ungarndeutsche, Hungarian: magyarországi németek) are the ethnic German minority of Hungary, sometimes also called Danube Swabians (German: Donauschwaben, Hungarian: dunai svábok), many of whom call themselves "Shwoweh" in their own Swabian dialect. Danube Swabian is a collective term for a number of German ethnic groups who lived in the former Kingdom of Hungary, including the Kingdom of Croatia-Slavonia, Vojvodina, Banat and Transylvania. Other ethnic German groups previously lived on the territory of both the former Hungarian kingdom as well as on the territory of present-day Hungary since the Middle Ages onwards, most notably in Budapest but not only. As of the 2022 census there are 142,551 German speakers in Hungary.

Hungarian Germans refers to the descendants of Danube Swabians who immigrated to the Carpathian Basin and surrounding regions, and who are now minorities in those areas. Many Hungarian Germans were expelled from the region between 1946 and 1948, and many now live in Germany or Austria, but also in Australia, Brazil, the United States, and Canada. However, many are still dispersed within present-day Hungary.

== History ==
Three distinct waves of ethnic German migration can be identified on the territories of historical Hungary before the 20th century.

=== Medieval settlement ===
The first two waves of settlers arrived in the Kingdom of Hungary during the Middle Ages (more specifically during the High Middle Ages between the 11th and 13th centuries) and formed the core of the citizenry of a few towns in Upper Hungary (i.e. Zipser Germans, "Zipser Sachsen") and southern Transylvania (i.e. Transylvanian Saxons, "Siebenbürger Sachsen"). The first wave began approximately 1000 years ago, when knights in the company of Giselle of Bavaria, the German-born wife of King Stephen I, first King of Hungary, entered the country.

=== Habsburg settlement ===
The third, largest wave of German-speaking immigrants arrived in Hungary as the result of a deliberate settlement policy of the Habsburg government after the Ottoman Empire was driven from Hungarian territory. Between 1711 and 1780, German-speaking settlers from Southern Germany, Austria, and Saxony emigrated to southwestern Hungary, including, Buda, Banat, and Szatmár County. This influx of immigrants helped to bring economic recovery and cultural distinction to these regions. By the end of the 18th century, over one million German-speaking residents lived in the Kingdom of Hungary. At the time, a flourishing German-speaking culture existed in the kingdom, publishing German-language literary works, newspapers, and magazines. Moreover, a German-language theater operated in the kingdom's capital, Budapest.

=== 19th century ===
Throughout the 19th century, a strong German industrial community developed, particularly in the glass-blowing, masonry, and foundry metalworking sectors. In response, a strong Hungarian nationalist political movement rose in the second half of the century to assimilate German-speaking citizens and their economic power into Hungarian culture. The movement's objectives were advanced by a number of policies, including the forced replacement of German in ethnic German schools with Hungarian.

=== 20th century ===
By 1918, at the end of World War I, almost two million Danube Swabians and other German-speaking peoples lived in what is now Hungary, Romania, Slovakia, and the former Yugoslav republics. Between 1918 and 1945, several factors greatly reduced the number of German-speaking residents in the former kingdom; consequently, only thirty percent of the original German-speaking population was left after World War II. The number of Germans in the Hungarian kingdom was more than halved by the Treaty of Trianon in 1920, as the kingdom was forced to make large cessions of its territory to neighbouring countries.

In 1938, a National-Socialist German organization was formed, the Volksbund der Deutschen in Ungarn, under the leadership of Franz Anton Basch, becoming the most influential political organization among Hungarian Germans. In 1940, it became the official representative body of Hungarian Germans and was directly controlled by Germany. The Volksbund had representatives in the Hungarian parliament until 1945. Through limited volunteer enlistment and widespread conscription, as well as the wholesale transfer of entities of the domestic armed services, many ethnic Germans ended up serving in military units raised or controlled by the Third Reich and fighting on behalf of the German war effort in World War II. This included several units of the Waffen SS and spanned combat operations in the proximity of Hungary, its possessions, and beyond.

Toward the end of the Second World War, the German-speaking community in Hungary was seen as a scapegoat by the communists, and a process of ethnic cleansing was undertaken. Citing "security reasons", the advancing Red Army deported about 600,000 civilians and prisoners of war from Hungary, of whom 40,000–65,000 were Germans. A significant number of Germans, mostly members of Nazi organisations, avoiding or fearing deportation to Siberia, fled Hungary as well. Many Germans were sent to Germany, first to the American occupation zone, and later to the Soviet occupation zone. Overall, approximately 220,000 Germans were expelled from Hungary.

== Expulsion ==
With World War II still raging in 1945, various factions competing for immediate and postwar Hungarian political power sought to decide how to treat ethnic Germans. Opinions were divided, with the Hungarian Communist Party and its ally, the National Peasant Party, calling for the expulsion of all Germans, whereas the major democratic party, the Smallholder Party, favored deporting only former Volksbund and Waffen SS members. In May 1945, the Hungarian government announced that the problem was not a larger Swabian one but one of German fascists: it resolved to deport only former Waffen SS soldiers and confiscate the lands of Volksbund members. Shortly thereafter, however, it asked for authorization from Moscow to deport 200,000 to 250,000 ethnic Germans to the Soviet occupation zone of Germany. This was far greater than the number of Volksbund members, reinforcing the theory that the goal was the elimination of an unwanted ethnic group rather than just that of German fascists. The German population in Hungary, however, was never subject to the same brutal persecution and excesses as in Poland, Czechoslovakia or Yugoslavia.

The initiative for including the expulsion of ethnic Germans from Hungary at the August 1945 Potsdam "Big Three" conference came from the Soviet Union. Together with the Hungarian Communist Party, the USSR used the argument of collective Swabian guilt to hide their true goal of radical land reform. In the spring of 1945, Marshall Voroshilov demanded from the Hungarian government the complete expulsion of the Germans from Hungary. All those ethnic Germans who declared German as their native language were considered eligible for transfer. The government estimated the number of Germans to be removed from Hungary to be 200,000 to 250,000.

Certain categories of Hungarian Germans were exempted from deportation, mostly those who had been active members of democratic parties or labor unions or persecuted by the Nazis for claiming Hungarian nationality. Later, in 1947, industrial workers in critical industries, miners, indispensable craftsmen and agricultural workers were also exempted, unless they had been Volksbund or Waffen SS members. Exemption committees established by the government were in reality under the control of the Communist Party. Thus on occasion, wealthy Swabians who had not been Volksbund members were expelled whereas working-class ethnic Germans, now Hungarian Communist Party members, were exempted, even though they had been part of the Volksbund.

Voices were raised in Hungary against these arbitrary expulsions. The liberal parties, particularly the Smallholder Party, and the surviving democratic press, criticized the sweeping nature of classifying every ethnic German as a traitor. Cardinal József Mindszenty (of Swabian origin), head of the Roman Catholic Church in Hungary and fierce anti-communist, repeatedly protested the confiscation of property and expulsion of ethnic Germans. He appealed to world public opinion, strongly condemning government treatment of ethnic Germans in Hungary. These protests had no effect, and with increasing communist domination of the Hungarian Government, all opposition was gradually eliminated. (In 1949, Cardinal Mindszenty was tried for treason by the Communist government and given a life sentence. In the 1956 Hungarian revolution, he was given asylum in the U.S. Embassy in Budapest, from whence he was finally allowed to go into exile in 1971.)

The expulsion of ethnic Germans occurred in two phases: the first phase lasted from January to June 1946 and, after a short interruption in the summer of 1946, continued until December 1946. The refugees were first sent to the American zone of occupation in Germany. The second phase of expulsions began in August 1947. Because the U.S. Government refused to take any more refugees into its zone, the ethnic Germans were sent to the Soviet zone of occupation. About 50,000 Swabian Germans were transferred to camps in Saxony, from which they were later dispersed to other areas in the Soviet zone. But by this time, the majority of the ethnic Germans remaining in Hungary were anxious to leave, as their living conditions had become unbearable. Ironically, in this second wave of expulsions, the most skilled and industrious German workers were removed from Hungary. This had a long-term detrimental effect on the Hungarian economy. The expulsions were completely discontinued in the autumn of 1948.

In all, 239,000 Swabian Germans were forcibly deported from Hungary. About 170,000 went to the US zone in Germany, 54,000 to the Soviet zone, and 15,000 to Austria. It is estimated that 11,000 ethnic Germans civilians lost their lives during the expulsions.

Those ethnic Germans who had opted for Hungarian nationality in the 1941 census, who selected Hungarian as their native language, and who were completely integrated into Hungarian society, were generally able to avoid deportation. By 1948, with communists dominating the Hungarian Government, class warfare took precedence over nationalism. Communist Party leader Rákosi stated that the remaining Swabians, mostly skilled workers, should be reintegrated into the Hungarian State. In October 1949, a general amnesty of all ethnic Germans was decreed. Six months later, in May 1950, the expulsions were officially ended, and all remaining Germans given Hungarian citizenship. This created another crisis among Hungary's German community, whose members could no longer leave the country because they were Hungarian citizens.

== Treatment in post-World War II Hungary ==
The coat of arms of the Germans of Hungary

Things began to improve for minority groups, including Hungarian Germans, under a program of economic liberalization called Goulash Communism. This movement, led by the then-General Secretary of the Hungarian Communist Party János Kádár, guaranteed certain economic and cultural rights to minority groups. In 1955, a new organization, the Association of Hungarian Germans (German: Verband der Ungarndeutschen), was founded. A major focus of the group was the teaching of the German language in Hungarian schools. Because of the government's previous position on German culture, very little German was taught in schools at the time, and the group's organizer feared "a mute generation" had been raised by the Hungarian school system. The group's organizers felt that the Hungarian German youth had a very poor command of the German language, including limited speech comprehension, which they found disturbing. The group met with success in the 1980s, when German gained status as a minority language, thus gaining legal standing in the Hungarian school system. The number of bilingual schools continued to rise. In 2001, 62,105 people declared themselves to be German, and 88,209 people declared an affinity with German cultural values and traditions.

In the 2018 Hungarian parliamentary election, a representative of Hungary's German minority – Imre Ritter of the National Self-Government of Germans in Hungary – was elected for the first time since 1933.

Counties by ethnic German population
County	2022 census		2011 census		2001 census	
County	count	% of population	count	% of population	count	% of population
Bács-Kiskun	8,327	1.68%	12,341	2.37%	7,781	1.42%
Baranya	19,208	5.43%	25,777	6.67%	22,720	5.58%
Békés	1,892	0.6%	3,344	0.93%	2,205	0.55%
Borsod-Abaúj-Zemplén	3,123	0.5%	4,210	0.61%	2,198	0.3%
Budapest	21,407	1.27%	28,818	1.67%	18,097	1.02%
Csongrád-Csanád	2,223	0.57%	2,556	0.61%	1,502	0.35%
Fejér	5,247	1.28%	7,252	1.7%	5,103	1.17%
Győr-Moson-Sopron	11,162	2.4%	12,203	2.72%	5,543	1.26%
Hajdú-Bihar	1,892	0.36%	2,398	0.44%	902	0.16%
Heves	1,389	0.49%	1,576	0.51%	658	0.2%
Jász-Nagykun-Szolnok	1,269	0.36%	1,609	0.42%	631	0.15%
Komárom-Esztergom	7,302	2.43%	10,930	3.59%	9,336	2.95%
Nógrád	1,185	0.65%	1,384	0.68%	1,200	0.54%
Pest	23,662	1.77%	30,176	2.48%	18,041	1.66%
Somogy	6,025	2.05%	5,319	1.68%	2,122	0.63%
Szabolcs-Szatmár-Bereg	1,868	0.35%	2,797	0.5%	1,049	0.18%
Tolna	7,274	3.5%	11,983	5.2%	11,552	4.63%
Vas	5,108	2.05%	5,428	2.12%	2,387	0.89%
Veszprém	7,852	2.34%	11,158	3.17%	6,068	1.65%
Zala	5,136	1.97%	4,437	1.57%	1,249	0.42%

== Notable people ==
- Lajos Abafi (1840–1909) was a Hungarian editor, a librarian and entomologist
- József Angster (1834–1918), Hungarian German organ-making master
- Clotilde Apponyi (1867–1942), Austro-Hungarian noblewoman, women's rights activist and a diplomat
- Lajos Aulich (1793–1849), general and minister of war
- Franz Anton Basch (1901–1946), Shwovish Nazi politician, the chairman of Volksbund der Deutschen in Ungarn and the leader of the Shwoveh (Danube Swabian) community in Hungary
- Károly Beregfy (1888–1946), Hungarian military officer and politician
- Lujza Blaha (1850–1926), Hungarian actress and singer
- Jakob Bleyer (1874–1933), Hungarian German studies scholar, literary scholar
- Elza Brandeisz (1907–2018), Hungarian dancer, teacher, and supercentenarian
- Koloman Brenner (born 1968), German-Hungarian linguist, politician, and associate professor
- Josef Budenz (1836 – 1892), German comparative linguist
- Ferenc Erkel (1810 – 1893), Hungarian composer, conductor and pianist
- Kamill Feleki (1908 – 1993), Hungarian film, stage and television actor
- Frigyes Feszl (1821 – 1884), architect
- Ábrahám Ganz (1814 – 1867), iron manufacturer, machine and technical engineer and entrepreneur
- Géza Gárdonyi (1863 – 1922), Hungarian writer and journalist
- Samuel Genersich (1768 – 1844) Carpathian German physician and botanist
- Hilda Gobbi (1913 – 1988), Hungarian actress
- Johann Christian Gottlob Baumgarten (1765 – 1843), German physician and botanist
- Gusztáv Gratz (1875 – 1946), Hungarian politician
- Károly Gundel (1883 – 1956), Hungarian restaurateur, business magnate and philanthropist
- Béla Guttmann (1899 - 1981), Hungarian football player and manager
- Henrik Haggenmacher (1827 – 1917), Swiss-born Hungarian industrialist, business magnate, philanthropist and investor
- Frank Hasenfratz (1935 – 2022), Hungarian-born Canadian billionaire businessman
- József Haubrich (1883 – 1939), Hungarian politician
- Alajos Hauszmann (1847 - 1926), Hungarian architect, professor, and member of the Hungarian Academy of Sciences
- Ottó Heinek (1960 – 2018), Hungarian journalist and politician
- Vilmos Hellebronth (1895 – 1971), Hungarian soldier
- Ferenc Herczeg (1863 - 1954), Hungarian playwright and author
- Nándor Hidegkuti (1922 – 2002), Hungarian football player and manager
- Hanna Honthy (1893 - 1978), Hungarian opera singer and actress
- Pál Jávor (1902 – 1959), Hungarian actor
- Mari Jászai (1850 - 1926), Hungarian actress
- Mária Lebstück (1831 – 1892), Hussar officer
- Ödön Lechner (1845 – 1914), Hungarian architect
- Philipp Lenard (1862 – 1947), Hungarian-born German physicist and the winner of the Nobel Prize for Physics
- Sándor Márai (1900 – 1989), Hungarian writer, poet, and journalist
- Thomas Mauksch (1749 – 1832), Carpathian German naturalist, botanist, Lutheran pastor, and wine merchant
- Erzsi Máthé (1927 – 2023), Hungarian stage, film and television actress
- András Mechwart (1834 – 1907), German-born Hungarian-German mechanical engineer
- József Mindszenty (1892 – 1975), Hungarian cardinal
- Mihály Mosonyi (1815 – 1870), Hungarian composer
- Mihály Munkácsy (1844 – 1900), Hungarian painter
- Lili Muráti (1914 – 2003), Hungarian film and stage actress
- Mór Perczel (1811 – 1899), Hungarian landholder and general
- Zita Perczel (1918 – 1996), Hungarian actress
- Joseph Petzval (1807 – 1891), Mathematician, inventor, and physicist
- Erno Polgar (1954 – 2018), Hungarian author
- Ottokár Prohászka (1858 – 1927), Hungarian Roman Catholic theologian
- Ferenc Puskás (1927 – 2006), Hungarian footballer and manager
- Géza von Radványi (1907 – 1986), Hungarian film director, cinematographer, producer and writer
- Imre Ritter (born 1952), Hungarian mathematician, auditor, tax consultant, politician and MP for the National Self-Government of Germans in Hungary
- Henrik Rohmann (1910 – 1978), Hungarian harpist and harp teacher
- Marika Rökk (1913 – 2004), German-Austrian dancer, singer and actress
- Sára Salkaházi (1899 – 1944), Hungarian Catholic religious sister
- Imre Steindl (1839 – 1902), Hungarian architect
- József Schweidel (1796 – 1849), Honvéd general
- István Schweitzer (1887 – 1981), Hungarian military officer
- Ignaz Semmelweis (1818 – 1865), Hungarian physician and scientist of German descent
- Éva Szörényi (1917 – 2009), Hungarian actress
- Nikolaus von Üxküll-Gyllenband (1877 – 1944), German businessman
- Johnny Weissmuller (1904 – 1984), American Olympic swimmer, water polo player and actor
- Sándor Wekerle (1848 – 1921), Hungarian politician
- Sándor Wekerle Jr. (1878 – 1963), Hungarian politician
- Henrik Werth (1881 – 1952), Hungarian military officer
- Aristid von Würtzler (1925 – 1997), Hungarian-American harpist and composer
- Miklós Ybl (1814 – 1891), Hungarian architect

== See also ==
- Germany–Hungary relations
- Society of Germans from Hungary
- Neues Budapester Abendblatt
- Hungarians in Germany
