= Budaörs =

Budaörs Wudersch
- Town
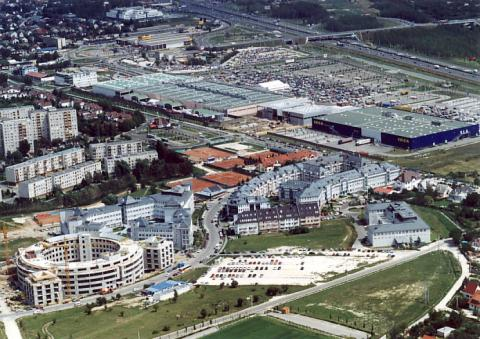
- Budaörs

- Flag Coat of arms

- Location of Budaörs Budaörs (Europe)
- Coordinates: 47.46072°N 18.95798°E
- Country: Hungary
- County: Pest
- District: Budakeszi

Government
  - Mayor: Tamás Wittinghoff (Independent)

Area
  - Total: 23.59 km^{2} (9.11 sq mi)

Population (2024)
  - Total: 29,398
  - Density: 1,203.65/km^{2} (3,117.4/sq mi)
- Time zone: UTC+1 (CET)
  - Summer (DST): UTC+2 (CEST)
- Postal code: 2040
- Area code: (+36) 23
- Motorways: M1
- Distance from Budapest: 9.2 km (5.7 mi) Northeast
- Website: www.budaors.hu

Budaörs (Hungarian: [ˈbudɒørʃ]; German: Wudersch; Croatian: Jerša, Erša) is a town in Pest County, Budapest metropolitan area, Hungary.

== Location ==
A suburb of Budapest, the town lies among the Buda and Csiki hills and the Tétény plateau in the Budaörs-basin. The dramatic Törökugrató [ˈtørøkuɡrɒtoː] hill (Türkensprung in German) rises above the town.

== History ==
The first settlements of the area date from 3500 BC. Excavations near the Hosszúrét creek resulted in findings from the Bronze Age (1900 BC to 800 BC). Before the Romans, the Celtic Eraviscus tribe occupied the area for about 100 years. Several villas have been recovered from the Roman times around Kamaraerdő [ˈkɒmɒrɒɛrdøː].

Little is known of the early history of the settlement after the Hungarian conquest. The name originates from the name of one of the Kabar tribes that joined the Hungarians.

The first written mention of Örs dates from 1236 when Béla IV, king of Hungary donated a church together with the St. Martin chapel to the Cistercians. Under the Turkish occupation during Ottoman rule the area was uninhabited and was resettled by Schwab peasants in the early 18th century by the countess Zsuzsanna Bercsényi.

While at the end of the 18th century only 1143 peasants lived here, in 40 years the number tripled. World War I affected the town badly, and it was the scene of a short fight between Hungarian royalists and the government in the Battle of Budaörs on 23–24 October 1921. After World War II, it was at Budaörs where the Communist government begun forcing ethnic Germans to leave their homes.

As of 2009, Budaörs had a population of 26,400.

== Visitor attractions ==
- Jakob Bleyer Museum of Local History, a museum which chronicles the history of the German settlers in Budaörs.
- Roman Catholic Church, a baroque church built between 1801 and 1810.

== Notable residents ==
- Imre Ritter (born 1952), Hungarian German mathematician, auditor, tax consultant, politician
- József Seregi (born 1939), sculptor and ceramist
- Margit Vanek (born 1984), triathlete
- Georg Müller (1917–2004), Hungarian-born German agriculturalist

== See also ==
- Budaörs Airport

== Twin towns – sister cities ==
Budaörs is twinned with:

- Amstetten, Austria
- Baia de Criș, Romania
- Bretzfeld, Germany
- Kanjiža, Serbia
- Nová Vieska, Slovakia
- Pakrac, Croatia
- Pyrgos, Greece
- Roudnice nad Labem, Czech Republic
