= Imre Ritter =

Hungarian politician (born 1952)

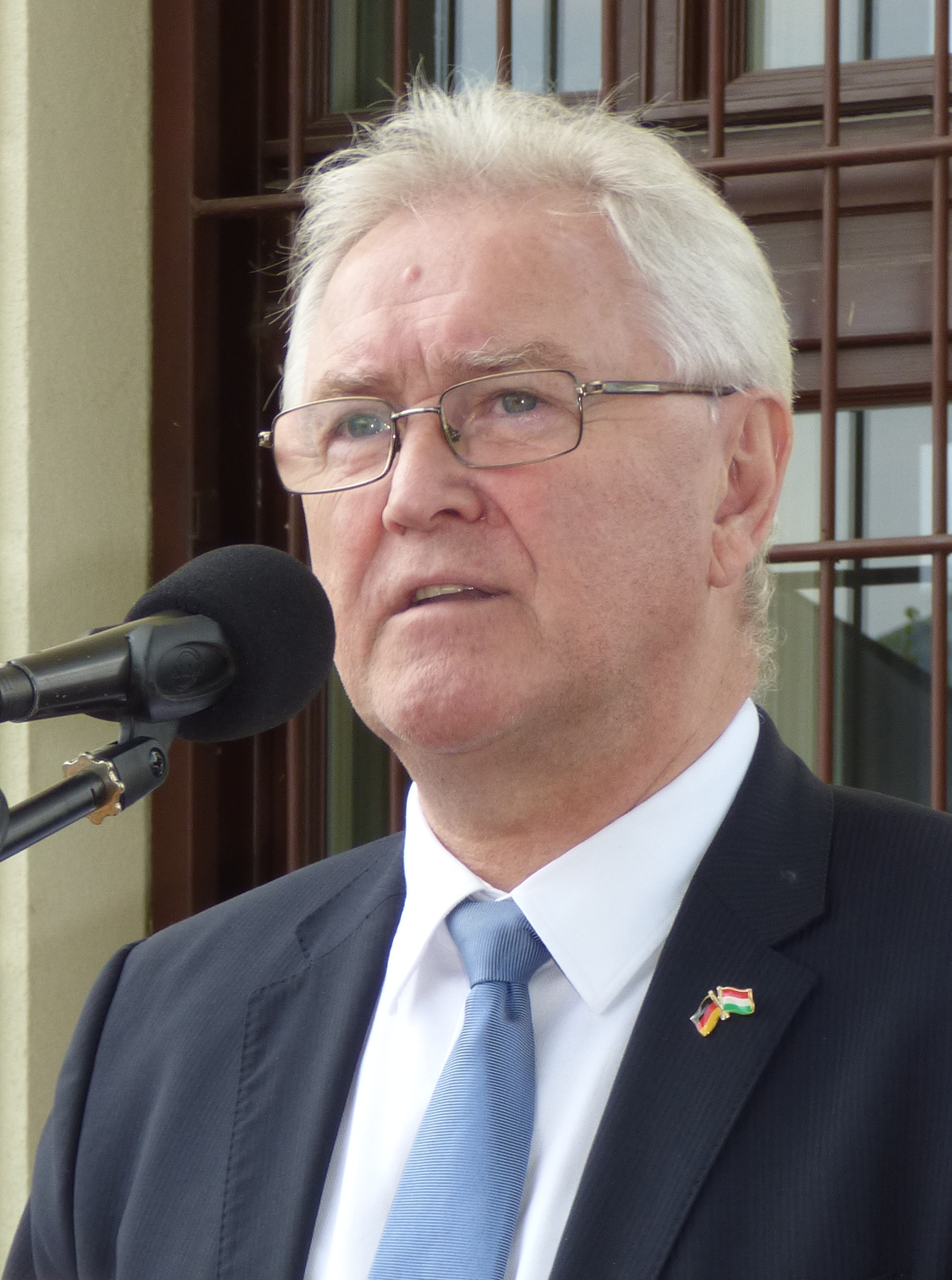
- Ritter in 2016

Member of the National Assembly
- In office 8 May 2018 – 8 May 2026
- Preceded by: Himself (as National Advocate)

National Advocate of the German minority of Hungary
- In office 6 May 2014 – 7 May 2018
- Preceded by: Office established
- Succeeded by: Himself (as Member of Parliament)

Deputy Chairman of the National Self-Government of Germans in Hungary
- In office 2011–2014

Personal details
- Born: 5 August 1952 (age 73) Budaörs, Hungary
- Party: National Self-Government of Germans in Hungary
- Other political affiliations: Fidesz
- Spouse: Vera Ritter
- Children: 5
- Education: Karl Marx University of Economics; Eötvös Loránd University
- Profession: Mathematician; auditor; tax consultant; politician

Imre Ritter (German: Emmerich Ritter; born 5 August 1952) is a Hungarian mathematician, auditor, tax consultant, politician and former member of the National Assembly for the National Self-Government of Germans in Hungary (MNOÖ). Between 2011 and 2014, he was the vice-president of the National Self-Government of Germans in Hungary, and between 2014 and 2018 the first national advocate of the German minority in the National Assembly.

== Life and profession ==
Ritter went to elementary school in his hometown, Budaörs, then graduated from the Fényes Elek Secondary School of Economics in Budapest. He was then admitted to the Karl Marx University of Economics where he graduated in 1976. He was employed at the Budapest Transport Company (BKV), where he initially worked as an economist and then became the economic deputy director. Meanwhile, he studied at the Eötvös Loránd University applied mathematics and earned his degree in 1982. In 1990 he left BKV when he founded his own accountancy and tax advisory office (the latter qualification was obtained in 1988). From 1996 on, the office started auditing. Ritter also has a tax expert qualification.

== Political career ==
After the end of communism, Ritter actively participated in the emerging national minority self-government. In 1994 he became a member of the first minority self-government in his hometown, Budaörs, and shortly afterward he was elected president. In 1998 he was elected president of the financial committee of the National Self-Government of Germans in Hungary (MNOÖ) and was re-elected in 2003 and 2007. In 2011 he was elected vice president of the MNOÖ. At the Hungarian parliamentary election in 1998 as the candidate of the Nationality Forum he could not obtain a mandate. In 1998, he was granted a privileged mandate as an independent German minority candidate at the Budaörs representative body, in which he spent a cycle. In 2006, he became a member of the representative body of Budaörs as a candidate of the Fidesz–KDNP, and in 2010 he candidated for the mayor of Budaörs, but was defeated by incumbent mayor Tamás Wittinghoff. At the 2014 parliamentary election, he was the second runner in the German nationality list. Since the list did not get the sufficient number of votes and Ottó Heinek did not accept his mandate, Ritter became the first national advocate of the German minority in the Hungarian National Assembly. For this reason, he resigned from his municipal government roles.

He was elected leader of the German nationality list at the 2018 parliamentary election where he received one seat in the National Assembly representing the National Self-Government of Germans in Hungary (MNOÖ). He became the first German minority representative in Hungary since the death of Jakob Bleyer in 1933.

During his first term as Member of Parliament, Ritter supported the government, voting for the ruling party Fidesz in most cases in the National Assembly. In several cases, he secured the two-thirds majority for the Orbán government in the passage of laws requiring it. Ritter became president of the Committee of Hungarian Nationalities in the parliament. He also worked in the Committee on Budgets. Ritter also decided to represent the interests of the other twelve "historical" national minorities, which sent advocates to the parliament, but were ineligible to elect their own MP due to fail to reach the lowered preferential quota. The government has multiplied the amount of state support for the MNOÖ during the 2018–2022 parliamentary term. Ritter was re-elected MP for the German minority in the 2022 Hungarian parliamentary election.

== Personal life ==
He is married to Vera Ritter. They have five children – four daughters, Orsolya, Mónika, Mária, Annarose and a son, Gergely. His wife works as teacher in the Jakob Bleyer German Nationality Elementary School.

He speaks Hungarian and German fluently and also has an English language exam of intermediate level.
