= Germany–Hungary relations =

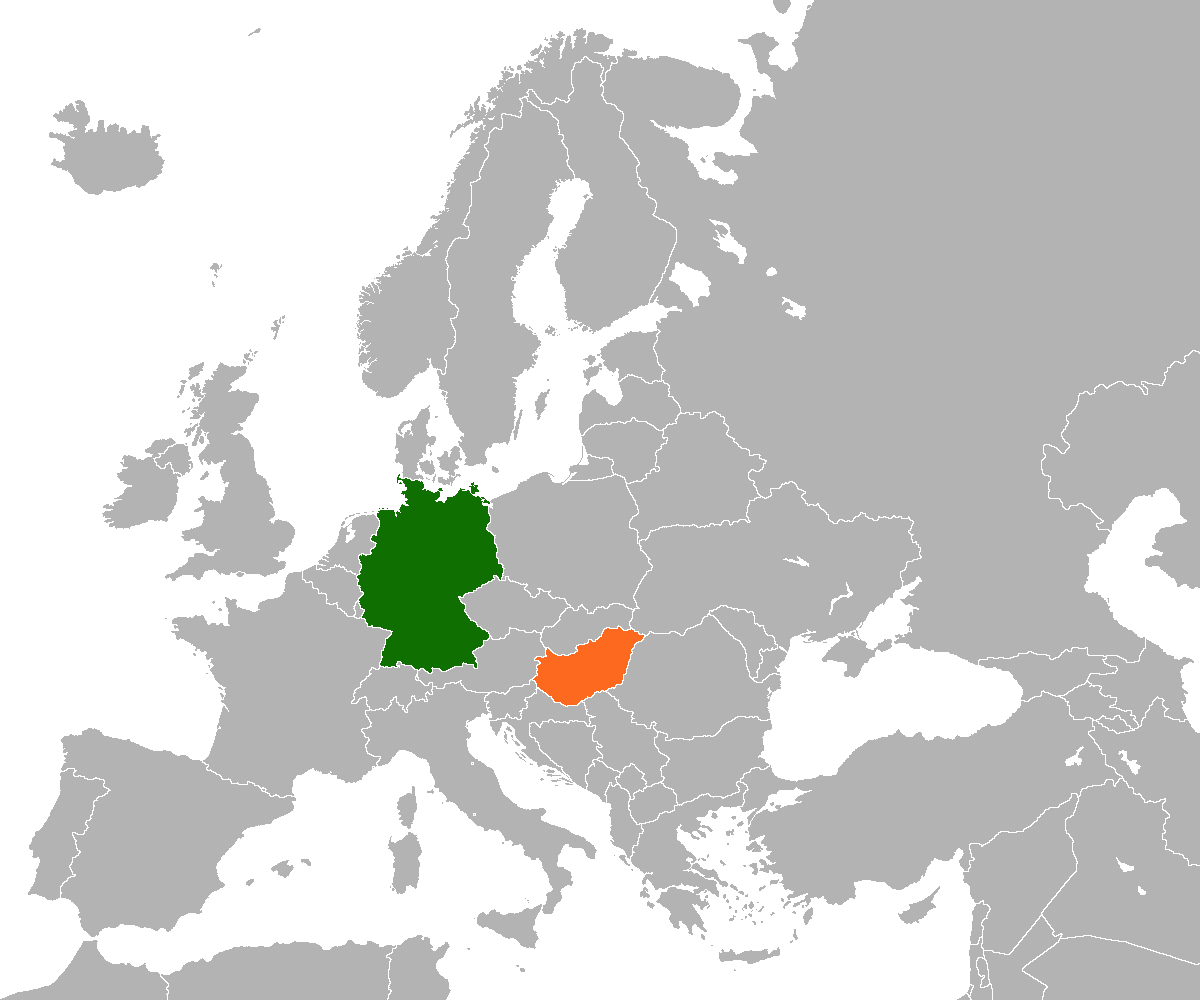

- Germany: Hungary

Diplomatic mission
- Embassy of Germany, Budapest: Embassy of Hungary, Berlin

Germany and Hungary are both member states of the European Union, NATO, OECD, OSCE, Council of Europe and the World Trade Organization. Germany has an embassy in Budapest. Hungary has an embassy in Berlin, two general consulates (in Düsseldorf and Munich) and nine honorary consulates (in Bremerhaven, Erfurt, Hamburg, Nürnberg, Schwerin, Dresden, Essen, Frankfurt and Stuttgart). The Agreement between the Federal Republic of Germany and the Republic of Hungary on 'Friendly Cooperation and Partnership in Europe' concluded on 6 February 1992 is one of the principal cornerstones of today's bilateral relations.

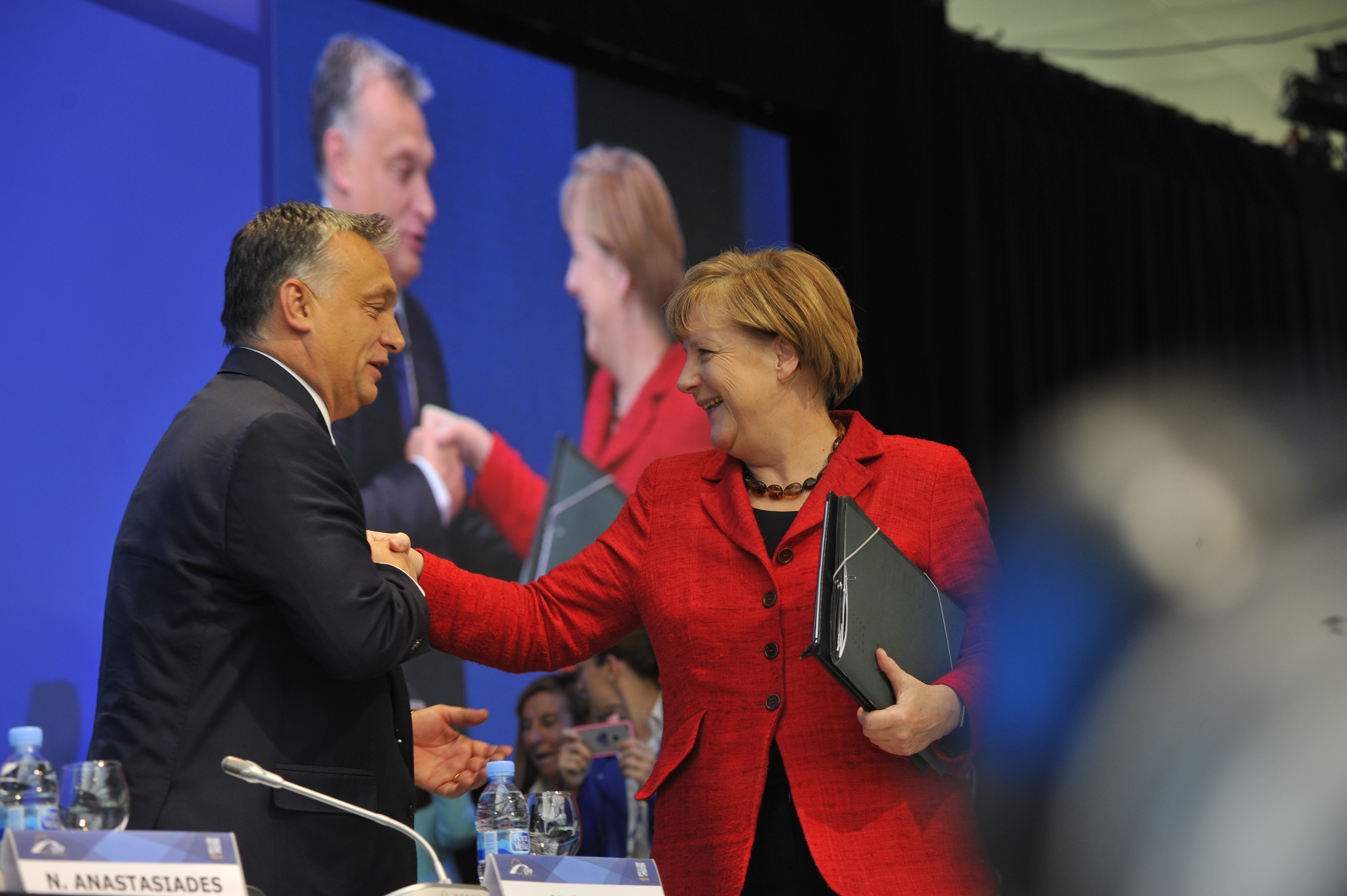
Angela Merkel and Viktor Orbán

Hungary set down an important marker for future bilateral relations in September 1989 when it opened up its border with Austria to refugees from East Germany, thus making a special contribution towards German reunification (1990) and the political transformation in Central and Eastern Europe. On the evening of 10 September 1989, Magyar Televízió broadcast that the Government of Hungary had decided to open that border at midnight. Three weeks prior, the Pan-European Picnic on the Austrian-Hungarian border near Sopron had taken place; about 660 citizens of East Germany had taken the opportunity to cross the Iron Curtain. On 25 August 1989, Hungary's prime minister Miklós Németh and his foreign minister Gyula Horn had secretly visited the German chancellor Helmut Kohl and foreign minister Genscher.

== History ==
=== Medieval period ===
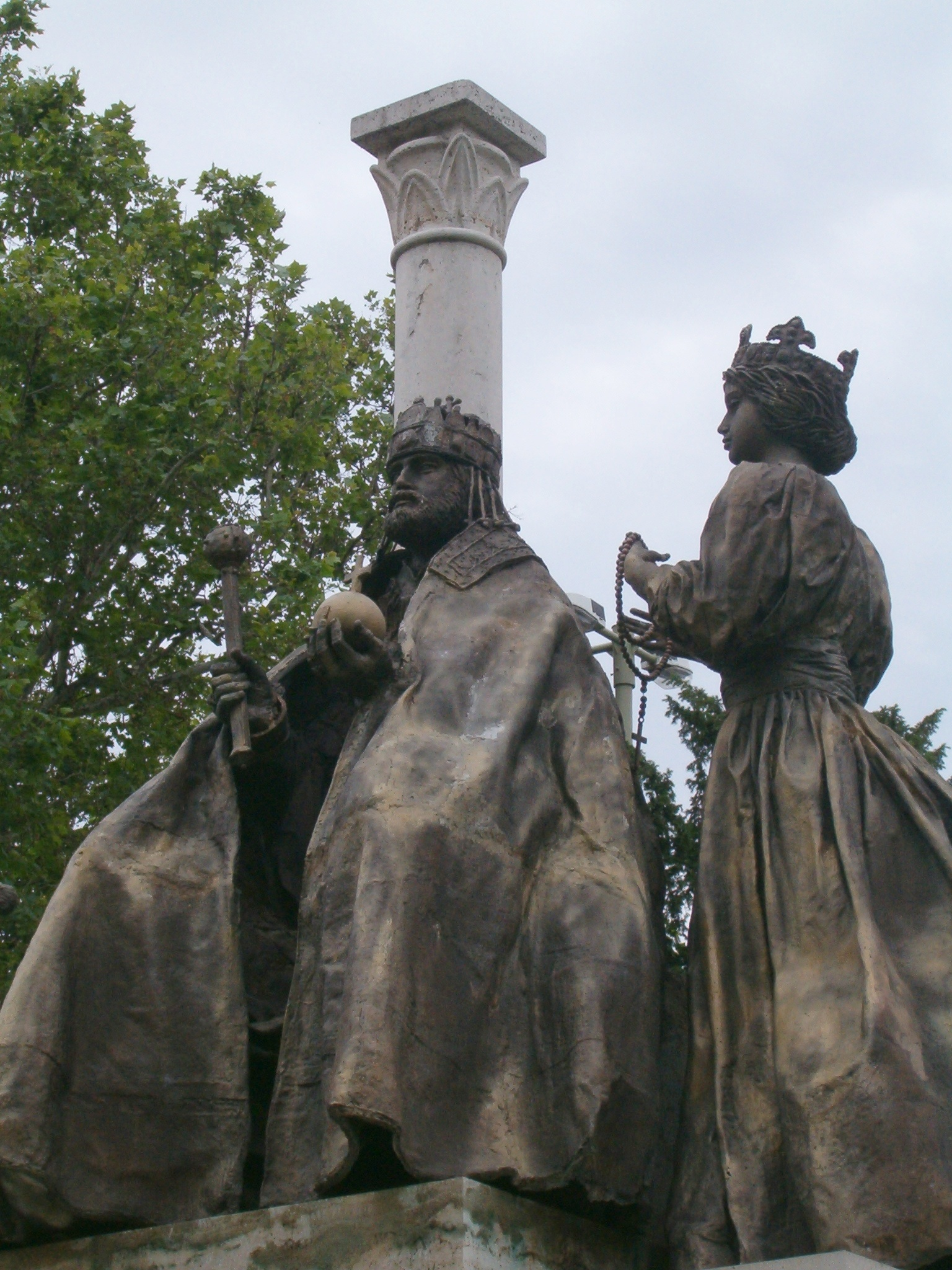
Stephen I of Hungary and Giselle of Bavaria (Szeged, Hungary)

Arnulf I of Bavaria maintained an alliance with the Hungarians until his death in 899. During their campaigns following their conquest of the Carpathian Basin the Hungarians stopped neither at the river Morava nor at the western border of Pannonia, but penetrated deeply into the territory of Bavaria as far as the river Enns. During the battle of Pressburg on 4 July 907, a Bavarian army was defeated by the Hungarians. The Battle of Lechfeld (10 August 955) was a decisive victory by Otto I the Great, King of the Germans, over the Hungarian leaders. The defeat effectively ended Magyar raids on the West.

Fearing a war of extermination, Géza of Hungary (972-997) assured Otto II that the Hungarians had ceased their raids and asked him to send missionaries. Otto complied, and in 975 Géza and a few of his kinsmen were baptized into the Roman Catholic Church. Géza used German knights and his position as chief of the Hungarians' largest clan to restore strong central authority over the other clans. Hungary's ties with the West were strengthened in 996 when Géza's son, Stephen I of Hungary married Princess Giselle of Bavaria, sister of Emperor Henry II. On the eve of World War I a Munich archaeologist discovered her grave in the church of the Niedernburg convent — which has since become a place of pilgrimage for the Hungarian faithful.

Transylvania was conquered and colonized with — besides Székely people — German Saxons in the eleventh and twelfth centuries. In 1241-42 the Mongols reduced Hungary's towns and villages to ashes and slaughtered half the population. Béla IV of Hungary repopulated the country with a wave of immigrants, transforming royal castles into towns and populating them with Germans, Italians, and Jews. Hungarian kings were keen to settle Germans in the country's uninhabited territories.

Sigismund, Holy Roman Emperor was from 1387 to 1437 also a King of Hungary. Although Hungary's economy continued to flourish, Sigismund's expenses outstripped his income. Social turmoil erupted late in Sigismund's reign as a result of the heavier taxes. Hungary's first peasant revolt was quickly checked, but it prompted Transylvania's Hungarian and German nobles to form the Union of Three Nations, which was an effort to defend their privileges against any power except that of the king.

=== Modern period ===
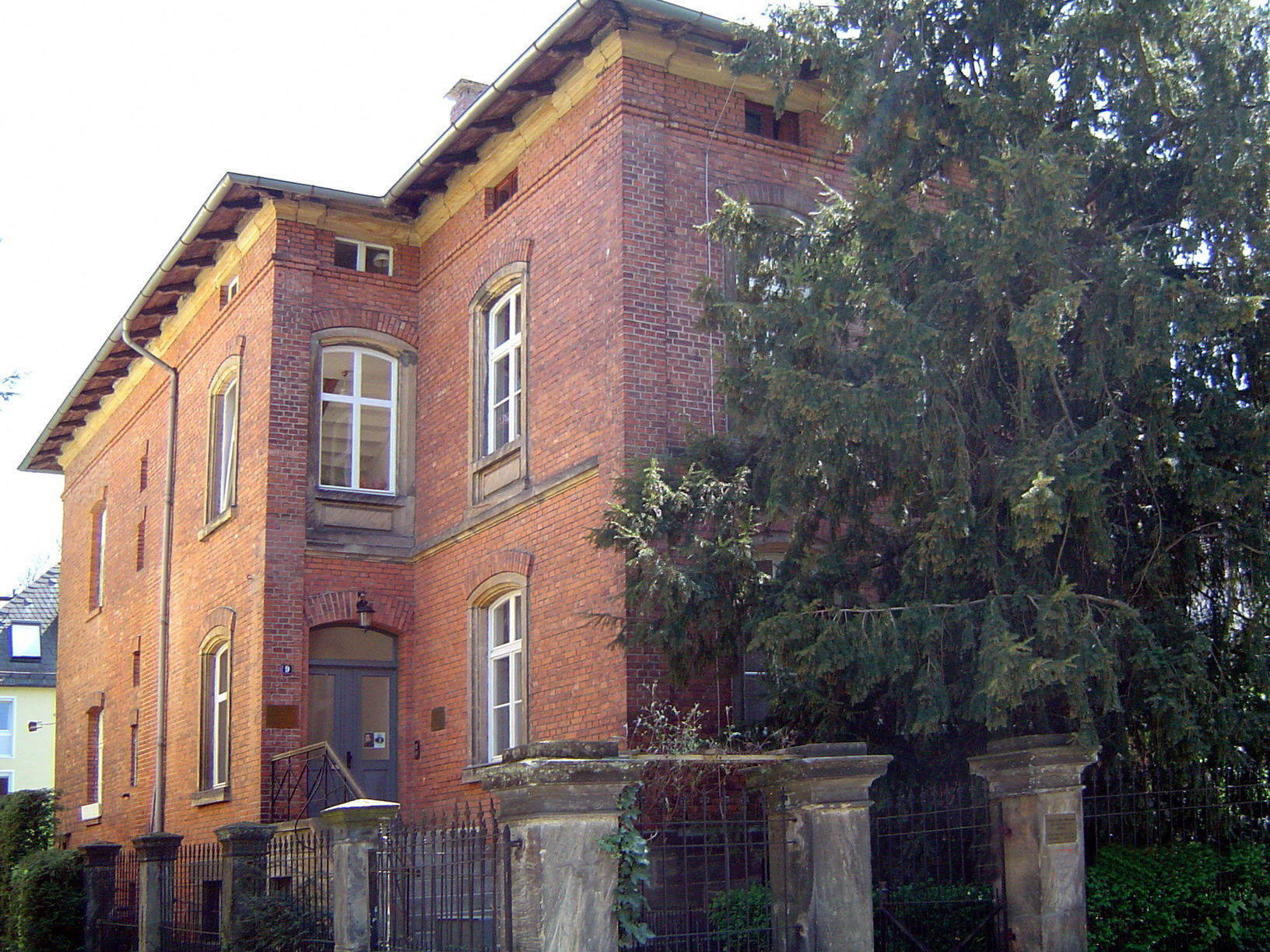
Ferenc Liszt Museum in Bayreuth

In the 18th century, under Charles VI and Maria Theresa, Hungary experienced economic decline. Centuries of Ottoman occupation, rebellion, and war had reduced Hungary's population drastically, and large parts of the country's southern half were almost deserted. A labor shortage developed and the Habsburgs called among others German peasants to Hungary.

In the 19th century Prussia's defeat of Austria-Hungary was a major prelude to the unification of the German Empire in 1871.

During World War I both countries were allied as Central Powers. The 1914 Septemberprogramm authorized by German Chancellor Theobald von Bethmann Hollweg proposed the creation of a Central European Economic Union, comprising a number of European countries, including Germany and Hungary, in which, as the Chancellor secretly stressed, there was to be a semblance of equality among the member states, but in fact it was to be under German leadership to stabilize Germany's economic predominance in Central Europe, with co-author Kurt Riezler admitting that the union would be a veiled form of German domination in Europe (see also: Mitteleuropa). The plan failed amid Germany's defeat in the war.

The countries shared a common border after Germany annexed Austria in 1938. Initially, the two countries were allied during World War II, although Hungary opposed and refused to take part in Germany's invasion of Poland, which started the war. The Hungarian army would take part in the German-led invasion of Yugoslavia and the also German-led invasion of the Soviet Union. In 1944, however, Hungary also fell under German occupation.

Hungary's 1989 decision to open its borders with Austria to help East German refugees flee to West Germany was a key factor in preparing for the German reunification. Despite this, in the 1990s, Germany opposed Hungary and other Central European nations joining NATO, according to archived German Foreign Ministry files released in 2022. Germany, pursuing a pro-Russian policy, tried to discourage those countries from joining NATO during confidential discussions, and tried to convince other member states against their NATO membership. Hungary eventually joined NATO in 1999.

In 2024, Hungary's Foreign Minister Péter Szijjártó summoned the German ambassador Julia Gross to complain about a speech in which she urged Hungarian public figures to speak out against actions she said were eroding the trust of the country's NATO and EU allies.

== Economic relations ==
Germany is Hungary's most important foreign trade partner, both as a customer and as a supplier. Germany is one of the countries with which Hungary has a trade balance surplus.

German aid to Hungary between 1990 and 1995 totaled DM 5 billion, loans and aid reflected privileged treatment of Hungary in the region.

Germany is also the leading foreign investor in Hungary: at the end of 2005, German companies accounted for some 28 per cent of all foreign direct investments in Hungary. In 2005 alone, Germany invested or reinvested some EUR 1.2 billion in Hungary. There are more than 7,000 companies in Hungary set up partially or wholly with German capital. One of the most important business links is the German-Hungarian Chamber of Commerce and Industry in Budapest representing the interests of more than 900 member companies from both countries. The overwhelming majority (75 per cent) of German investors have been very happy with their involvement in Hungary and would invest there again today, shown by an economic survey conducted by the Chamber.

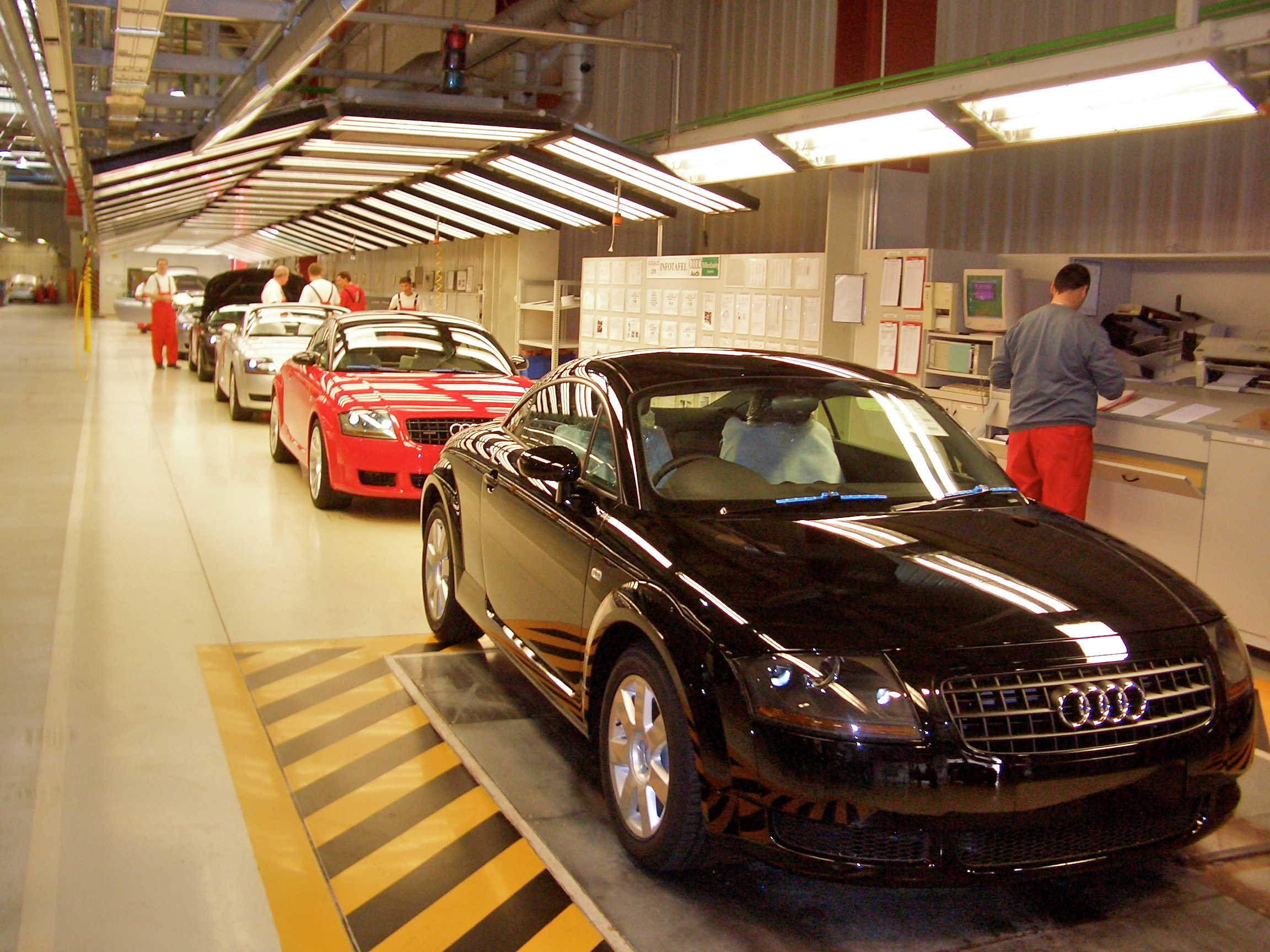
Quality control at the Audi plant in Győr (2005)

Audi has built the largest engine manufacturing plant of Europe (third largest in the world) in Győr becoming Hungary's largest exporter with total investments reaching over €3,300 million until 2007. Audi's workforce assembles the Audi TT, the Audi TT Roadster and the A3 Cabriolet in Hungary. The plant delivers engines to carmakers Volkswagen, Skoda, Seat and also to Lamborghini.

Daimler-Benz invests €800 million ($1.2 billion) and creates up to 2,500 jobs at a new assembly plant in Kecskemét, Hungary with capacity for producing 100,000 Mercedes-Benz compact cars a year.

Opel produced 80,000 Astra and 4,000 Vectra cars from March 1992 until 1998 in Szentgotthárd, Hungary. Today, the plant produces about half million engines and cylinder heads a year.

=== Automotive research ===
Leading automotive manufacturers, including Audi, Bosch, Knorr-Bremse, and ThyssenKrupp have established R&D centers in Hungary:

- Audi – Győr: engine development
- Bosch – Miskolc: electronic hand-tools designing
- Bosch – Budapest: electronic developments
- Continental Teves – Veszprém: development of electronics instruments for cars
- DHS Dräxlmaier – Érd: vehicle compartment designing
- EDAG – Győr: vehicle subunit development
- Knorr-Bremse – Budapest: electronic brake-system development
- Continental Temic – Budapest: car electronics development
- ThyssenKrupp – Budapest: electronic steering development
- WET – Pilisszentiván: electronic subunit development

== Cultural relations ==
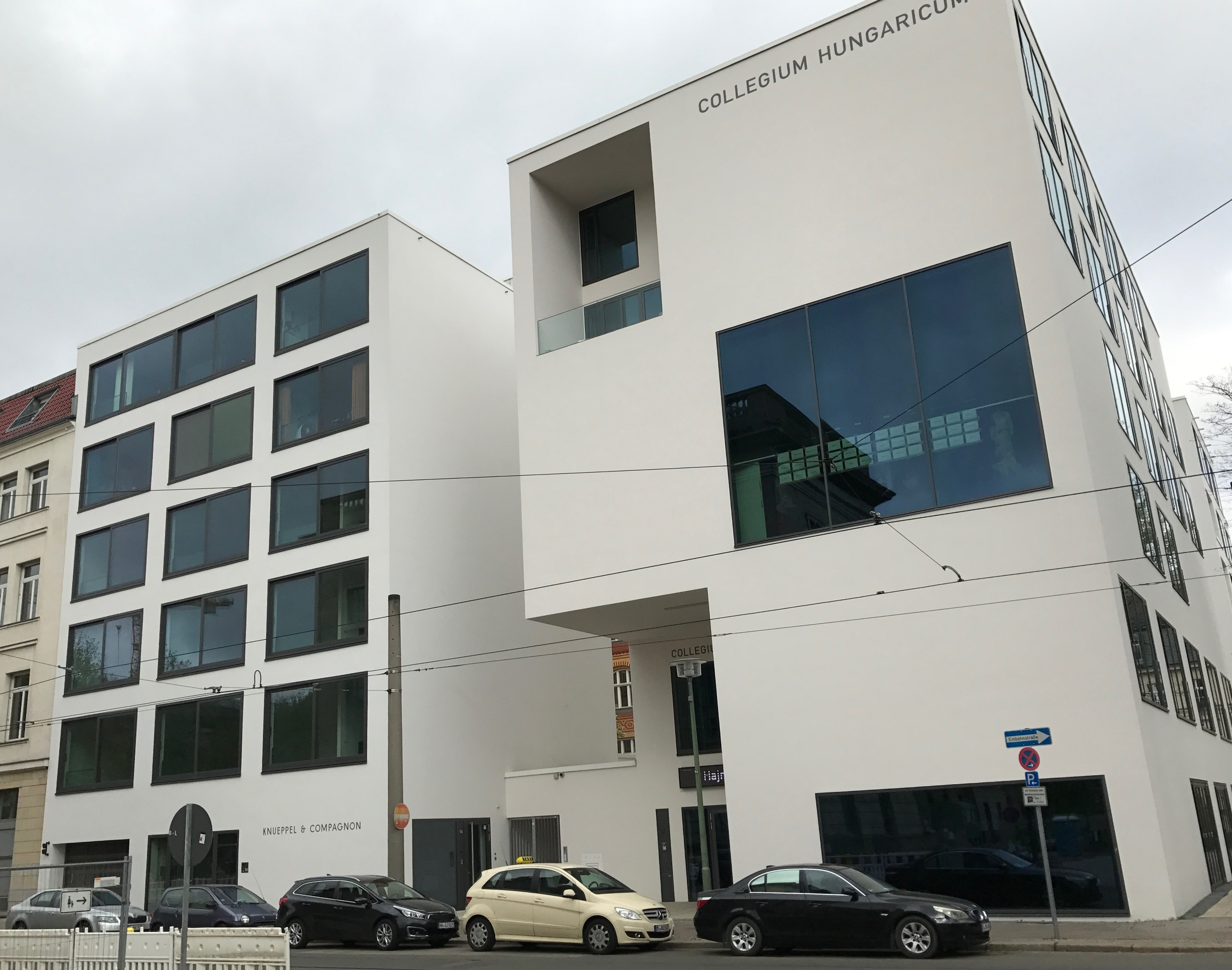
Collegium Hungaricum in Berlin

Germany and Hungary are closely cooperating in culture and education. The goal is the promotion of the German language, academic and school exchanges and cultural events.

The German language plays an important role in the education and economic sectors of Hungary. The Goethe Institute (GI) in Budapest — that has celebrated its 20th anniversary in 2008 — offers a comprehensive range of courses and close cooperation with schools in Hungary. There are also numerous programs designed to promote the German language among Hungary's ethnic German minority. In Budapest, the Thomas Mann Grammar School founded in 1992 is an international school also attended by Hungarians. The German Abitur and the Hungarian university entrance examination may be completed at the Ungarndeutsches Bildungszentrum (Education Centre for Ethnic Germans in Hungary) in Baja.

Hungarian literature is popular in Germany with the works of Péter Esterházy, Péter Nádas, Sándor Márai, Antal Szerb and Imre Kertész achieving the greatest success.

The Collegium Hungaricum in Berlin was founded in 1924. After 1945 it ceased operations, and was reopened in 1973, from 2000 under the old name. There is also a Hungarian Cultural Centre in Stuttgart, a branch of the Balassi Institute. There are museums dedicated to Hungarian composer and pianist Ferenc Liszt in Weimar and Bayreuth, and his sepulchral chapel is located in Bayreuth, where he died.

== Education ==
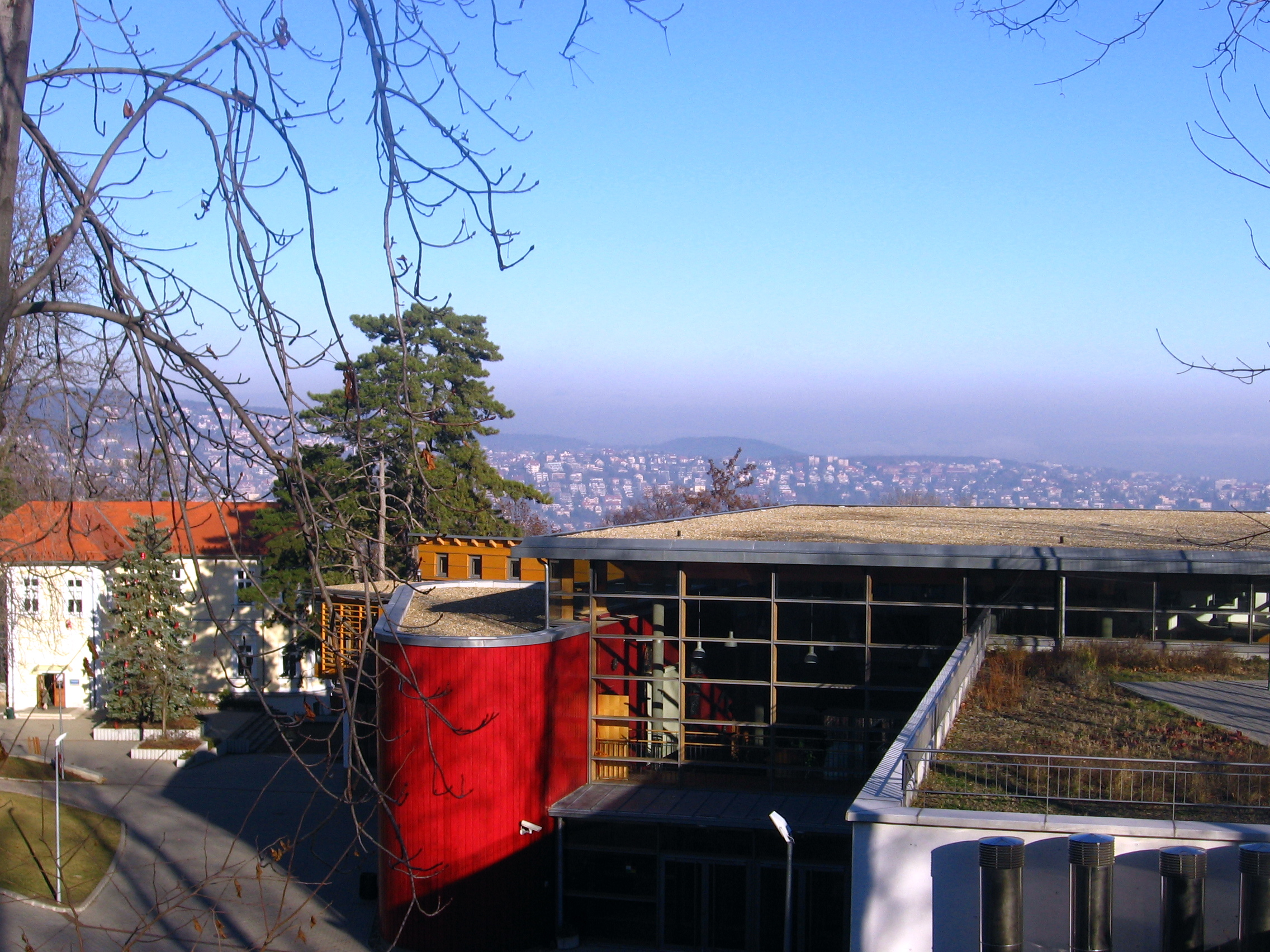
Thomas Mann Gymnasium, Budapest

There is a German international school in Budapest, Thomas Mann Gymnasium.

=== Academic level education ===
Every year, thousands of Hungarians travel to Germany on study and research exchanges. The German Academic Exchange Service (DAAD) and the Robert Bosch Foundation are awarding scholarships for these.

The Andrássy Gyula German Language University of Budapest plays a key role in German foreign cultural and education policy in Hungary.

== International organizations ==
While Germany was one of the founding members of the EU, Hungary joined in 2004. Germany joined NATO in 1955, and Hungary joined in 1999.

== Resident diplomatic mission ==
- Germany has an embassy in Budapest.
- Hungary has an embassy in Berlin and consulates-general in Düsseldorf and Munich.

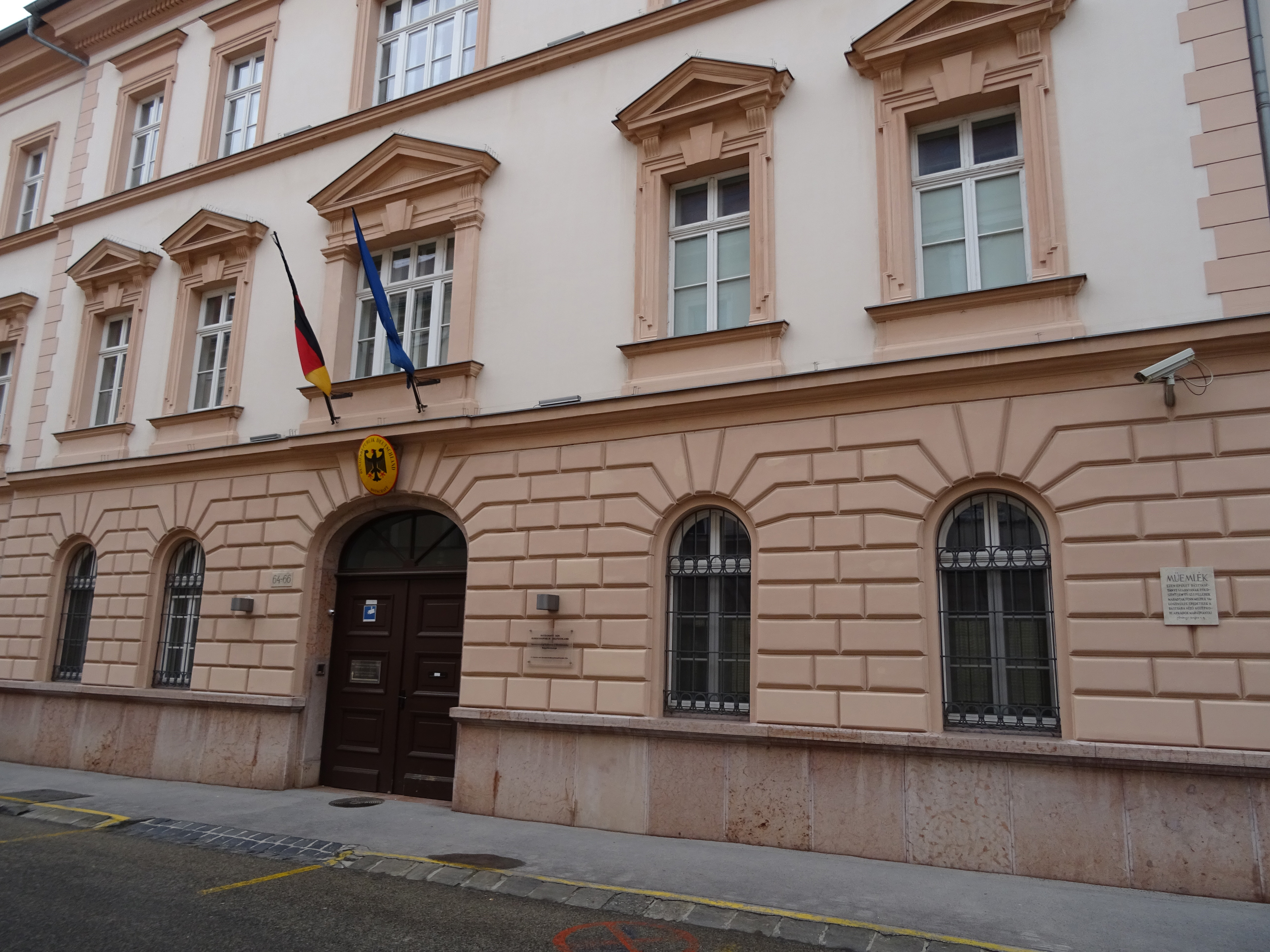
Embassy of Germany in Budapest

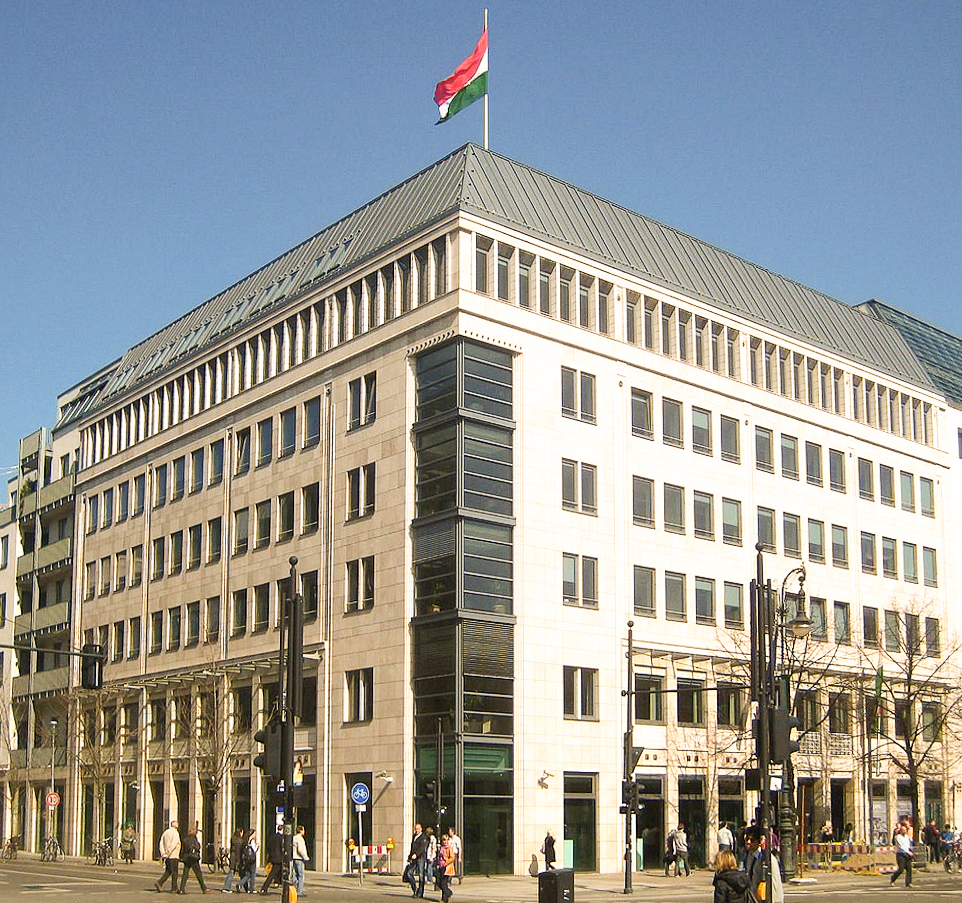
Embassy of Hungary in Berlin

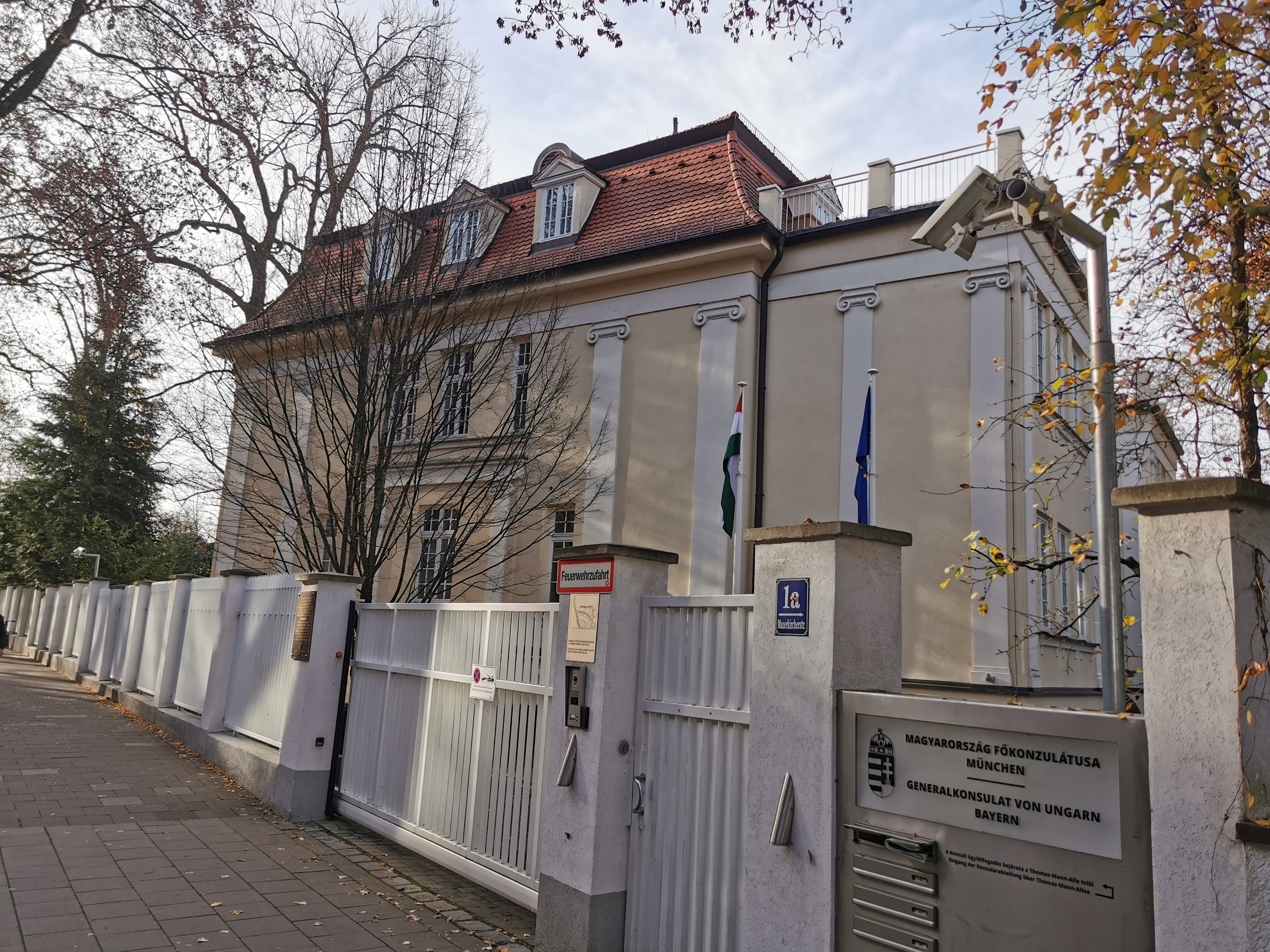
Consulate-General of Hungary in Munich

== See also ==
- Foreign relations of Germany
- Foreign relations of Hungary
- Germans of Hungary
- Hungarians in Germany
- Andrássy Gyula German Language University of Budapest
