= National Self-Government of Germans in Hungary =

German minority self-government in Hungary

National Self-Government of Germans in Hungary Landesselbstverwaltung der Ungarndeutschen Magyarországi Németek Országos Önkormányzata
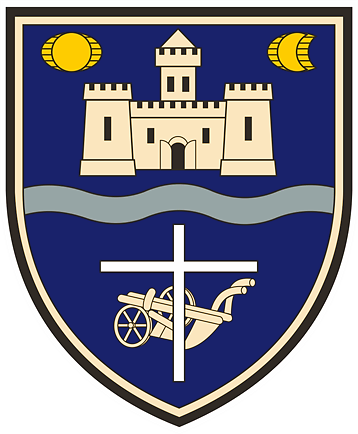
- Flag Coat of arms
- Interactive map of National Self-Government of Germans in Hungary
- Country: Hungary
- Ethnicity: Germans
- Established: 11 March 1995
- Seat: Júlia utca 9, Budapest

Government
  - President: Ibolya Hock-Englender
- National Assembly: 0 / 199
- Website: www.ldu.hu

The National Self-Government of Germans in Hungary (German: Landesselbstverwaltung der Ungarndeutschen, LdU; Hungarian: Magyarországi Németek Országos Önkormányzata, pronounced [ˈmɒɟɒrorsaːɡi ˈneːmɛtɛk ˈorsaːɡoʃ ˈøŋkormaːɲzɒtɒ], MNOÖ) is the nationwide representative organization of the German minority in Hungary.

== History ==
The 1993 Minorities Act established self-government institutions for ethnic minorities. After the 1994 elections for minority self-governments, the electoral assembly of the German minority elected the political and cultural representative body of the Germans of Hungary, the National Self-Government of the Germans in Hungary, on 11 March 1995. According to the opportunities offered by the 2011. CLXXIX. Nationality Act, it wants to implement a modern minority policy.

== Aims ==
Its main aims are to preserve and support the language, the intellectual heritage, the historical traditions and the German identity in Hungary. That includes the preservation of the German mother tongue in cultural areas, the teaching of German language in the Hungarian school system and in the field of international relations and the exchange of German relations by partnerships and programs.

The implementation of cultural autonomy, the takeover of the German institutions in Hungary, ensures the main activity of LdU.

At the same time, it supports co-operation of Hungary and its neighbours, above all with German-speaking countries.

It is the umbrella organization of 406 local minority self-governments and more than 500 cultural groups and other German associations of Hungary.

== Leaders ==
- Ottó Heinek (1999–2018)
- Olívia Schubert (2018–2019)
- Ibolya Hock-Englender (2019–)

== Electoral results ==
Since 2014, voters of ethnic minorities in Hungary are able to vote on nationality lists. The minorities can obtain a preferential mandate if they reach the quarter of the ninety-third part (which is $\frac{1}{4 \times 93}=\frac{1}{372}\approx0.2688\%$) of the list votes. Nationalities who did not get a mandate could send a nationality spokesman to the National Assembly.

In the 2018 parliamentary election, Imre Ritter was elected as the first German parliamentary spokesman in the history of the National Assembly.

=== National Assembly ===
Election	Leader (German name)	Constituency		Party list		Seats	+/–	Status
Election	Leader (German name)	Votes	%	Votes	%	Seats	+/–	Status
2014	Ottó Heinek (Otto Heinek)	—N/a		11,415	0.23 (#12)	0 / 199	New	Extra-parliamentary
2018	Imre Ritter (Emmerich Ritter)	—N/a		26,477	0.46 (#9)	1 / 199	▲1	Support (Fidesz–KDNP)
2022	Imre Ritter (Emmerich Ritter)	—N/a		24,630	0.44 (#7)	1 / 199	0	Support (Fidesz–KDNP)
2026	Gergely Gallai (Gregor Gallai)	—N/a		18,419	0.29 (#7)	0 / 199	▼1	Extra-parliamentary

== See also ==
- National Roma Self-Government, the minority self-government of Romani people in Hungary
