= Andrássy University Budapest =

Private university in Budapest, Hungary

Coordinates: 47.4918°N 19.0642°E

- Andrássy Gyula Budapesti Német Nyelvű Egyetem; Andrássy Gyula Deutschsprachige Universität Budapest
- Other names: AUB
- Type: University
- Established: 2001
- Endowment: Public Foundation for the German-Language University
- Rector: Zoltán Tibor Pállinger
- Students: 250
- Location: Budapest, Hungary
- Campus: 1088 Budapest, Pollack Mihály tér 3.
- Website: www.aub.eu

Andrássy University Budapest (AUB) (full name: Andrássy Gyula German Speaking University Budapest/Andrássy Gyula Deutschsprachige Universität Budapest) is a private university in Budapest, the capital of Hungary. Andrássy University Budapest was founded in 2001 and is the only completely German-language university outside the German-speaking countries. As a European university in Hungary, it is supported by five partner states (Austria, Baden-Württemberg, Bavaria, Germany, Hungary) and also by Switzerland and the autonomous region of Trentino-South Tyrol.

== History ==
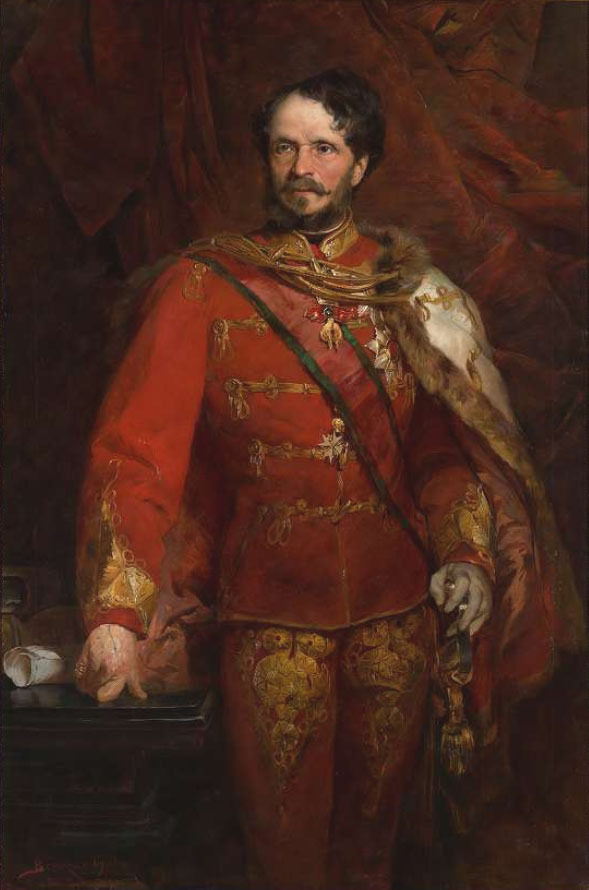
Gyula Andrássy (portrait by Gyula Benczúr, 1884)

The idea to found AUB goes back to the “Ulm Declaration” of 22 February 2001. The prime ministers of Hungary, the Republic of Austria, the State of Baden-Württemberg and the Free State of Bavaria came to an agreement during a summit meeting in Ulm to support a German-language university in Budapest which Hungary had been planning, and to take active part in its implementation. Thus the cornerstone for a multinational community project was laid. The then-planned expansion of the European Union was the tone-setting impulse; a contribution to the integration process of the Central European area into the European Union was made which continues to this day.

Founded in the same year by Hungary, the “Public Foundation for the German Language University in Budapest” served as agent. In June 2001, AUB received state recognition by the Hungarian Parliament. Just one year thereafter, the “Andrássy Gyula German-Language University in Budapest” (Andrássy University Budapest – AUB) initiated its teaching programme.

With the name “Andrássy Gyula German-Language University in Budapest“, the founders placed the institution and its future role in the historic traditional lineage of Central Europe. Its namesake, Count Gyula Andrássy (1823-1890), was an active participant of the revolution of 1848/49, from 1867 to 1871 Hungarian prime minister and finally, until his resignation in 1879, foreign minister of the Austro-Hungarian Monarchy. He was an involved proponent of the Austro-Hungarian Compromise, which was bound into the foundation of the Dual Monarchy. He was committed to the promotion of understanding among the nations, and through his extraordinary endeavours for the close cooperation of the Central European states, he is known as one of the most prominent diplomats of the 19th century.

AUB was the first university outside of Germany to be accredited according to German rules and criteria. With its quality assurance system certified by the evalag evaluation agency from Baden-Württemberg, the university guarantees the best study and teaching conditions. It was the fifth in Hungary to be accepted into the excellence program of Hungarian colleges, thus earning the title “University of National Excellence”.

Main building

== Studies ==
Bachelor´s degree Programmes (German-language):

- International Relations

Master's degree Programmes (German-language):

- International Relations – European Studies (also as a double master's programme together with the University of Leipzig, the University of Passau and the University of Wuppertal)
- International Economy and Business (also as a double master's programme together with the University of Bamberg)
- Management and Leadership (also as a double master's programme together with the Technical University of Dresden)
- LL.M. Comparative Political Science and Jurisprudence
- European and International Administration
- Central European Studies – Diplomacy ("Cultural Diplomacy")

Ph.D. Programme:

AUB's German-language interdisciplinary Ph.D. programme offers a graduate course in four subjects under the guiding perspective, “The Future of Central Europe in the European Union”:

- History
- Political science
- Jurisprudence
- Economics

== Building ==
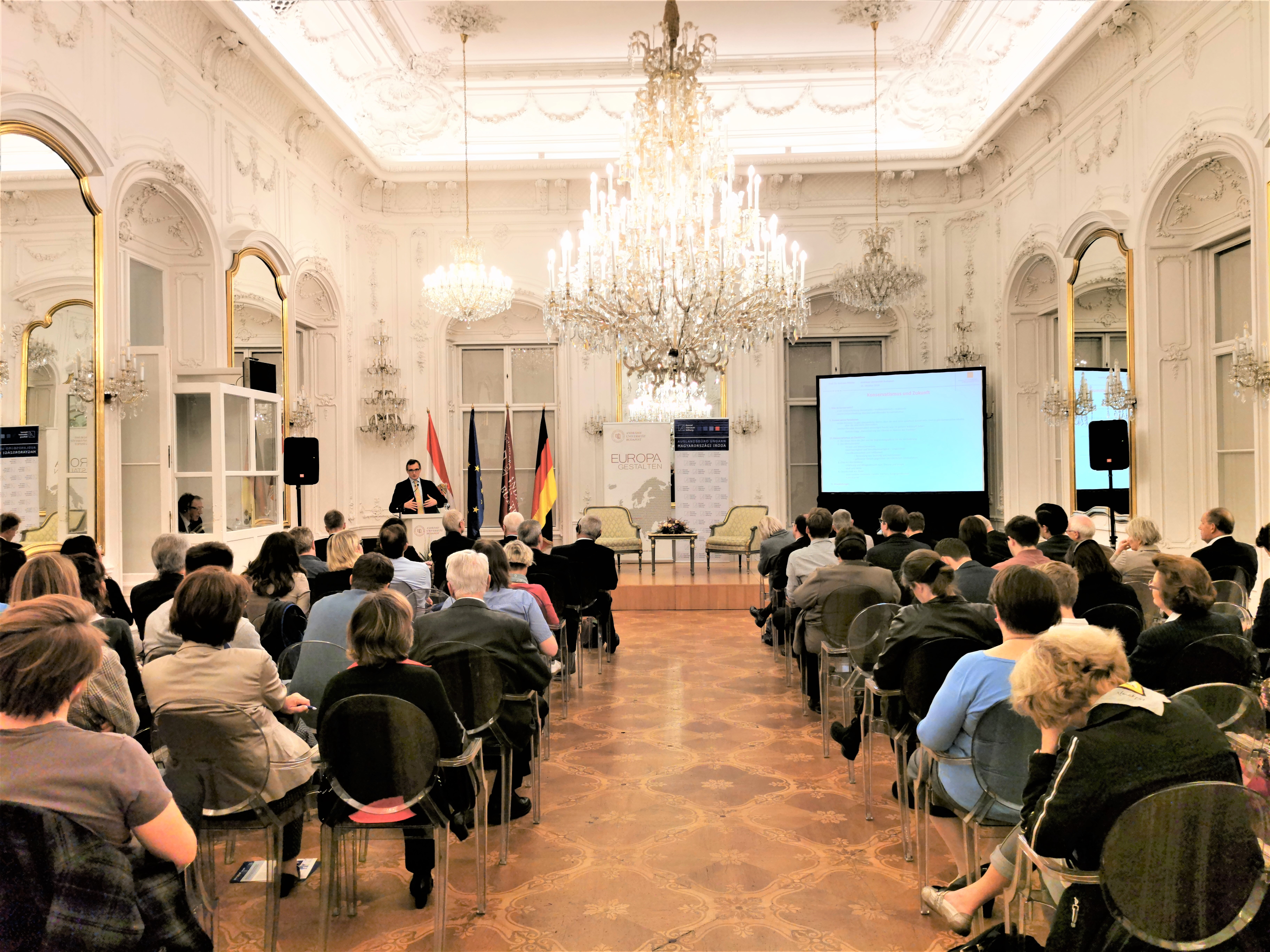
Spiegelsaal

Home of the AUB is the historical Festetics Palota, Budapest built by the Hungarian architect Miklós Ybl for the Hungarian statesman György Festetics and located in the centre of Budapest in the neighbourhood of the Hungarian National Museum.

== See also ==
- Austria–Hungary relations
- Germany–Hungary relations
