= Hungarians in Germany =

Hungarians in Germany Ungarn in Deutschland · Németországi magyarok
- Distribution of Hungarian citizens in Germany (2021)

Total population
- 207,000+

Regions with significant populations
- Germany: Mainly Bavaria, Baden-Württemberg and Hesse

Languages
- Predominantly German followed by Hungarian

Religion
- Predominantly Catholic and Calvinist; Minority Atheist

Related ethnic groups
- Other Hungarian people

There are around 207,000 Hungarians in Germany (Hungarian: Németországi magyarok, German: Ungarn in Deutschland) Around 75% of this population live in the states of Bavaria, Baden-Württemberg and Hessen.

== Population ==
Only about 60% arrived with a Hungarian passport, as many of them arrived from areas of the former Kingdom of Hungary (see Treaty of Trianon, 1920).

Major population changes:

- About 30,000 arrived after 1945
- About 25,000 arrived after the Hungarian Revolution of 1956
- 25,000 Gastarbeiter from Yugoslavia after 1960
- Around 5,000 migrants from Czechoslovakia after the Prague Spring of 1968
- Approx. 30,000 Hungarians from Transylvania after 1975
- About 15,000 fleeing communism in Hungary
- 15,000 moving to East Germany (until the 1990 German reunification)

== Culture ==
In 2006/2007, Hungary presented its country and culture in Germany with a whole series of cultural events including the exhibition "Germans in Hungary – Hungarians in Germany. European Lives".

== Notable individuals ==
- Albrecht Dürer, painter (his father moved to Germany from Hungary)
- Béla Ernyey, actor
- Collien Fernandes, television presenter, VJ, and actress (Hungarian on maternal side)
- Joschka Fischer, politician, foreign minister, his family was expelled from Hungary in 1946
- Imre Kertész, writer, recipient of the 2002 Nobel Prize in Literature
- Kevin Kurányi, football player (Hungarian on paternal side)
- Philipp Lenard, physicist, winner of the Nobel Prize for Physics in 1905
- Franz Liszt, composer
- Leslie Mándoki, musician
- Dzsenifer Marozsán, football player, captain of the Germany women's national football team
- Willi Orban - football player
- Gabor Steingart, journalist
- Niklas Süle, football player
- George Tabori, writer
- Patrick Buzas, ice hockey player
- Béla Réthy, sport reporter
- György Grozer, volleyball player
- Palkó Dárdai, football player
- Matyas Szabo, fencer
- Zoltán Sebescen, football player
- Nadine Schatzl, handball player
- Vera Molnar, actress
- Szebasztián Szabó, swimmer

== Gallery ==
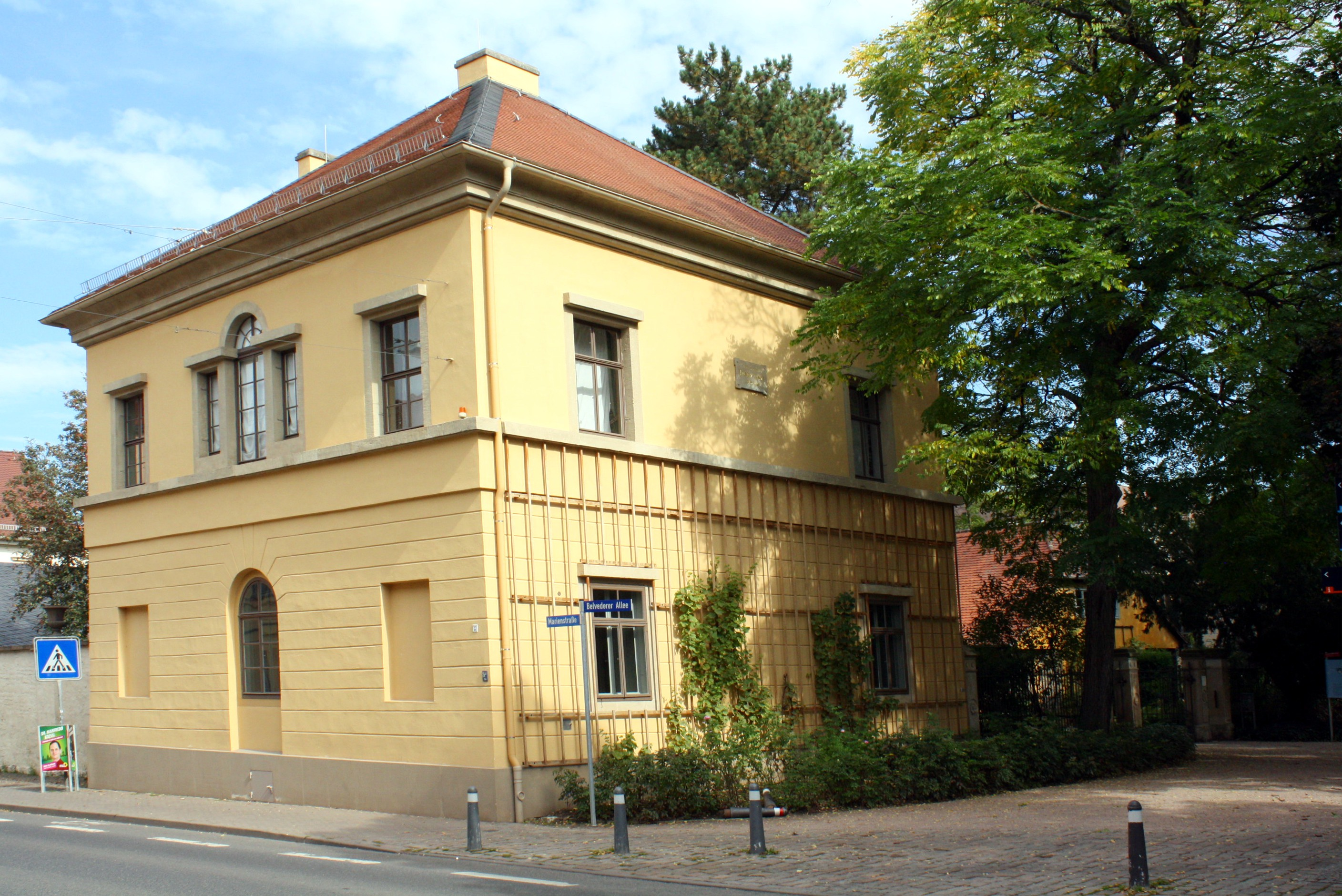
House of Franz Liszt, Weimar

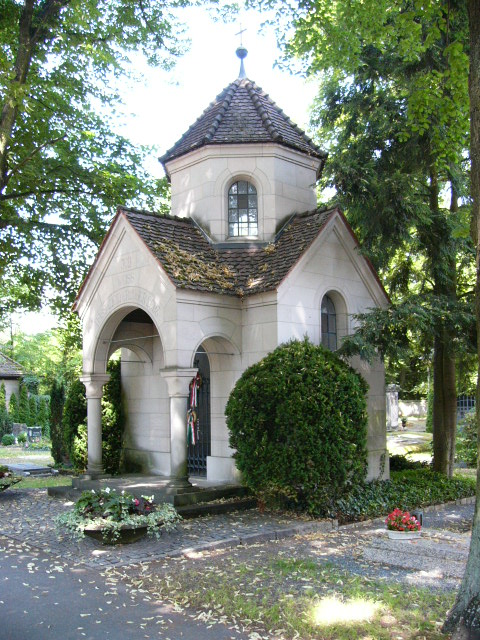
Tomb of Franz Liszt, Bayreuth

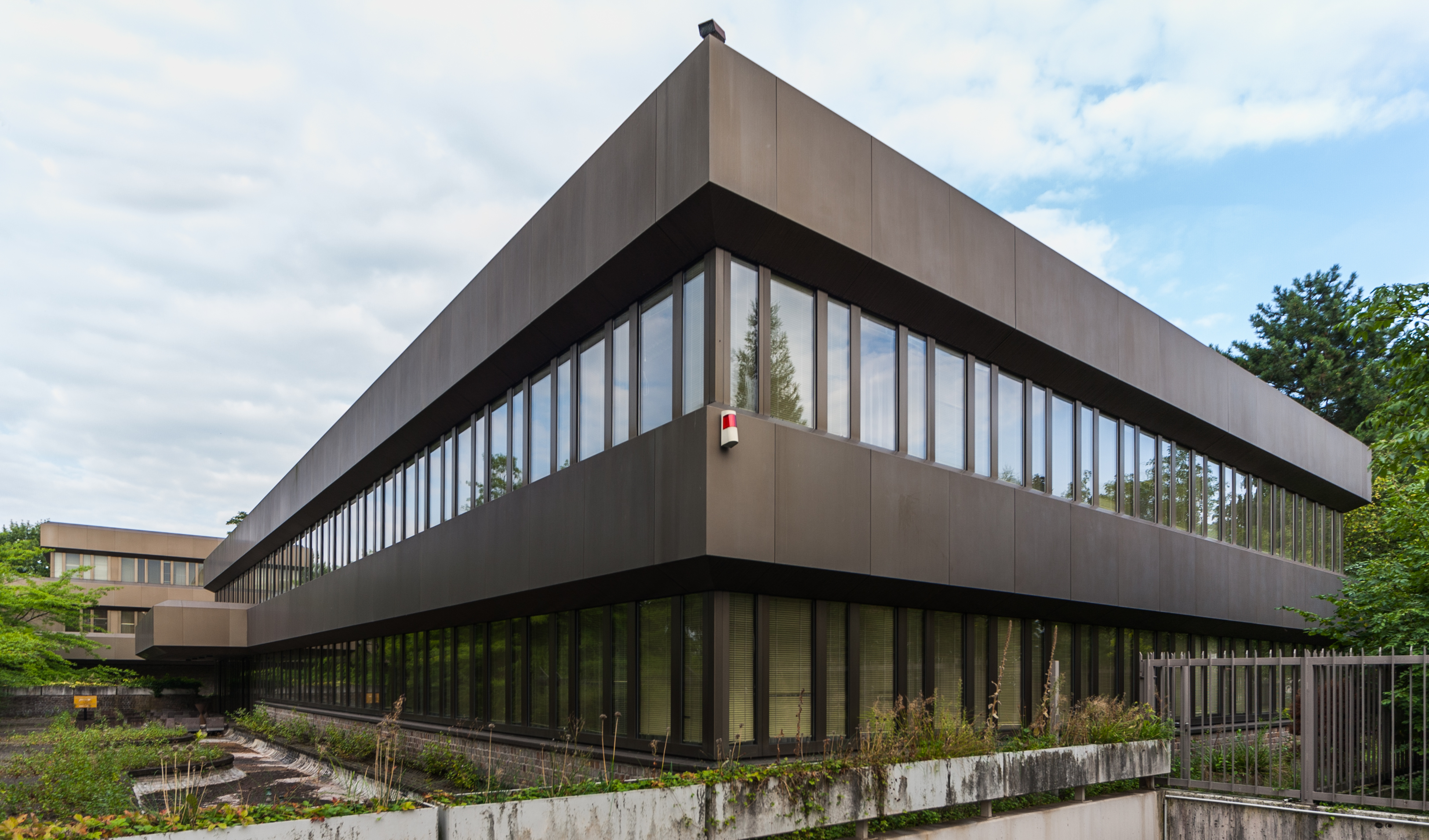
Former Hungarian Embassy, Bonn

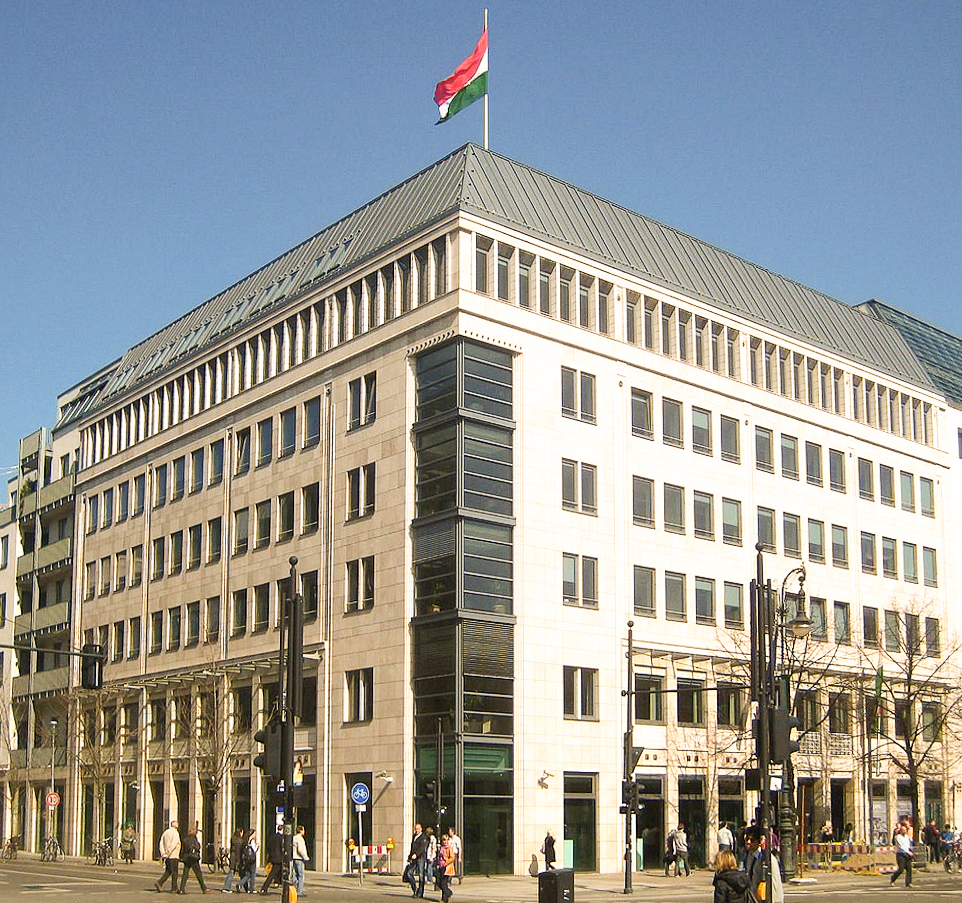
Hungarian Embassy, Berlin

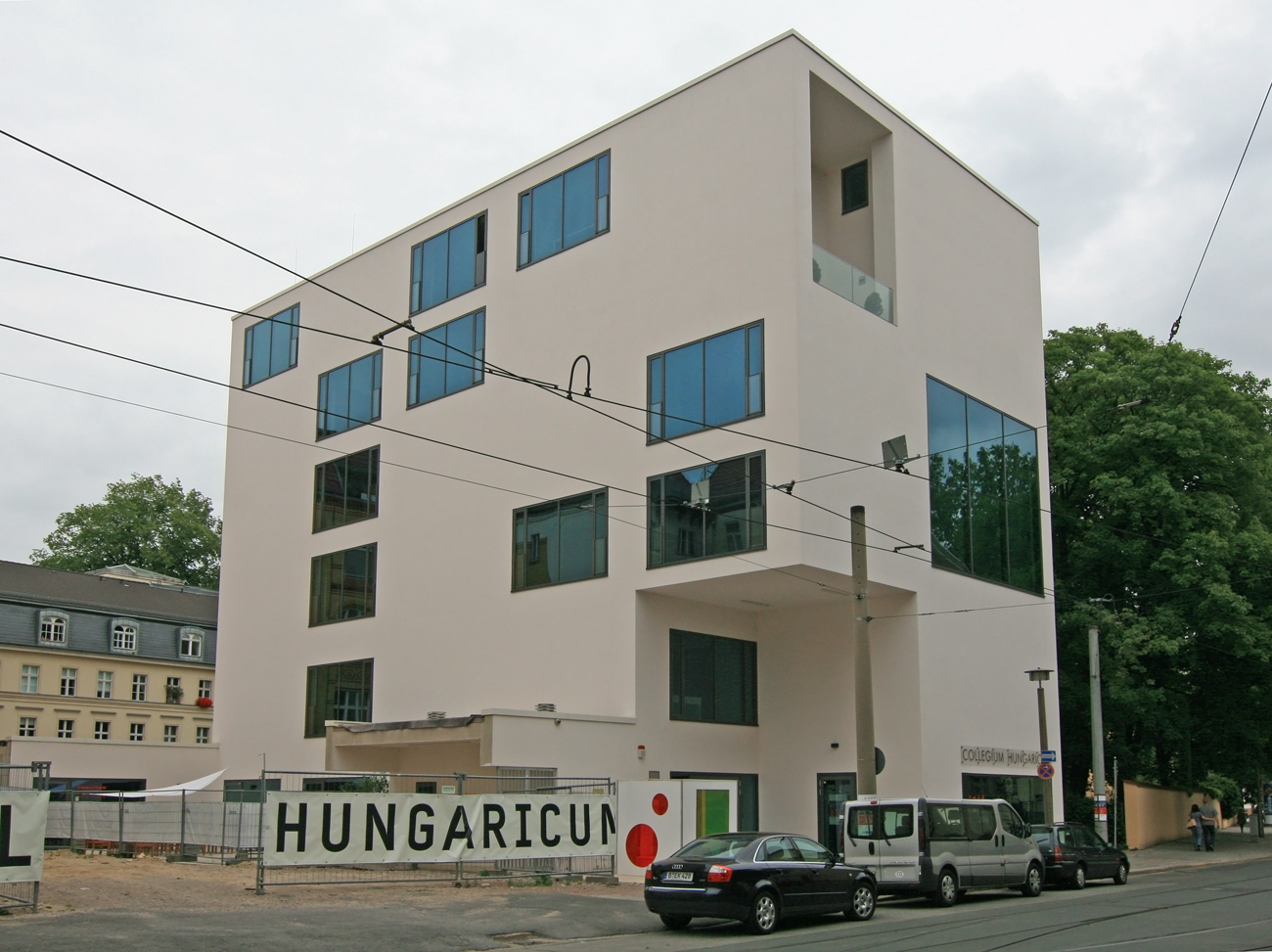
Collegium Hungaricum Berlin

== See also ==
- Germany–Hungary relations
- Hungarian diaspora
- Immigration to Germany
- Germans of Hungary
