= Nová Vieska =

Village and municipality in Slovakia

Nová Vieska Kisújfalu
- Municipality
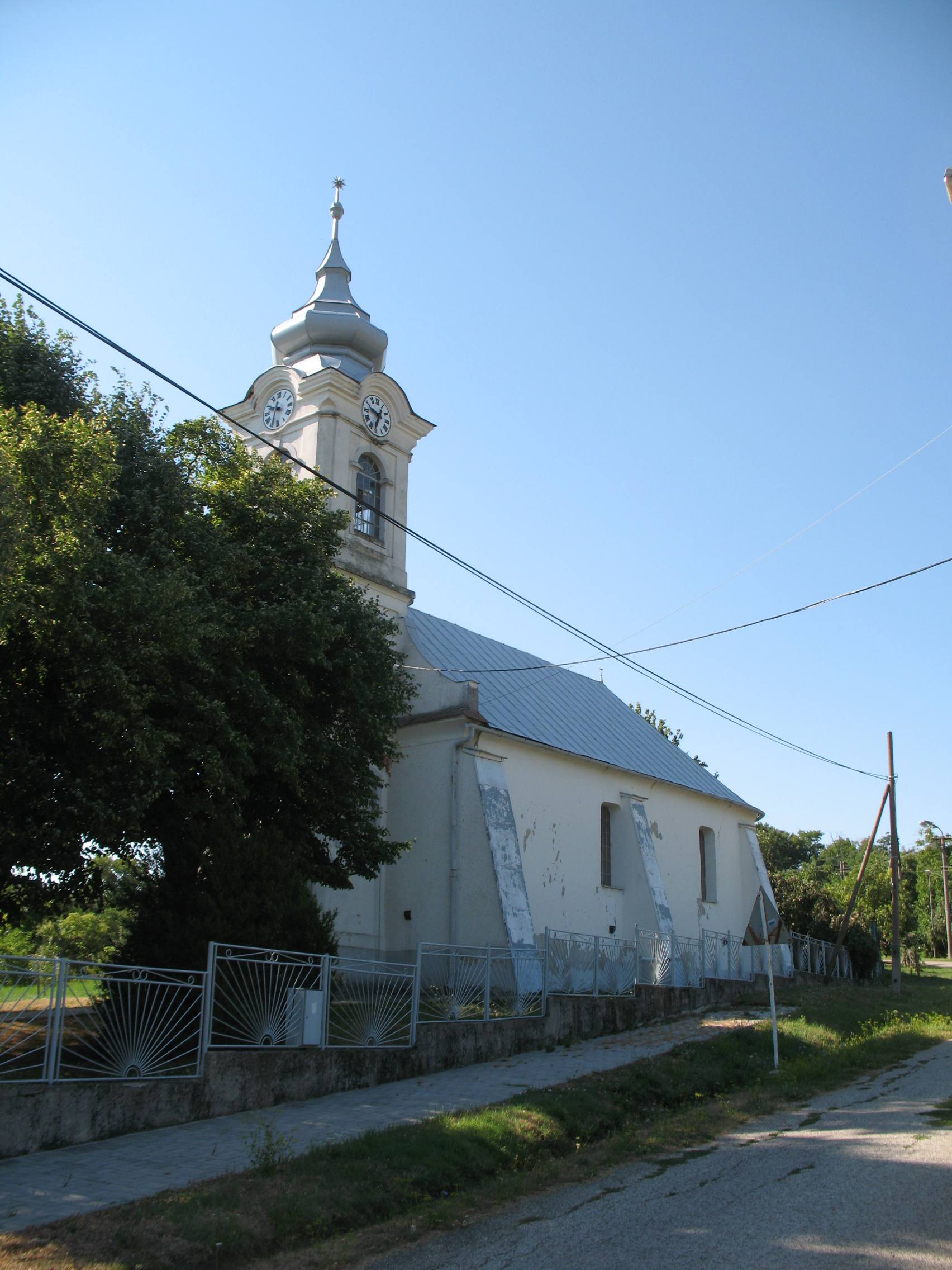

- Flag

- Location of Nová Vieska in the Nitra Region Location of Nová Vieska in Slovakia
- Coordinates: 47.87°N 18.47°E
- Country: Slovakia
- Region: Nitra Region
- District: Nové Zámky District
- First mentioned: 1295

Area
  - Total: 17.48 km^{2} (6.75 sq mi)
- Elevation: 133 m (436 ft)

Population (2025)
  - Total: 647
- Time zone: UTC+1 (CET)
  - Summer (DST): UTC+2 (CEST)
- Postal code: 943 41
- Area code: +421 36
- Vehicle registration plate (until 2022): NZ
- Website: www.novavieska.sk

Nová Vieska (Hungarian: Kisújfalu) is a village and municipality in the Nové Zámky District in the Nitra Region of south-west Slovakia.

== History ==
In historical records the village was first mentioned in 1295.

== Geography ==
The municipality lies at an altitude of 133 metres (436 ft) and covers an area of 17.48 km^{2} (6.75 sq mi) (2025).

== Population ==
Population statistic (10 years)
Year	1995	2005	2015	2025
Count	869	779	710	647
Difference		−10.35%	−8.85%	−8.87%

Population statistic
Year	2024	2025
Count	649	647
Difference		−0.30%

It has a population of 647 people (31 December 2025).

=== Ethnicity ===
Census 2021 (1+ %)
Ethnicity	Number	Fraction
Hungarian	574	87.5%
Slovak	91	13.87%
Not found out	25	3.81%
Total	656	

In year 2021 was 656 people by ethnicity 574 as Hungarian, 91 as Slovak, 25 as Not found out, 1 as Italian, 1 as Moravian and 1 as Other.

Note on population: The difference values of population numbers in the table "Population statistic" and in the sections "Ethnicity" & "Religion" is caused by the use of various statistical methods.

=== Religion ===
Census 2021 (1+ %)
Religion	Number	Fraction
Calvinist Church	421	64.18%
Roman Catholic Church	107	16.31%
None	69	10.52%
Baptists Church	17	2.59%
Not found out	14	2.13%
Evangelical Church	13	1.98%
Total	656	

In year 2021 was 656 people by religion 421 from Calvinist Church, 107 from Roman Catholic Church, 69 from None, 17 from Baptists Church, 14 from Not found out, 13 from Evangelical Church, 5 from Other and not ascertained christian church, 3 from Other, 2 from Christian Congregations in Slovakia, 2 from Greek Catholic Church, 1 from Eastern Orthodox Church, 1 from United Methodist Church and 1 from Ad hoc movements.

== Facilities ==
The village has a small public library and a football pitch.
