= Jakob Bleyer =

Hungarian politician and German sholar (1874–1933)

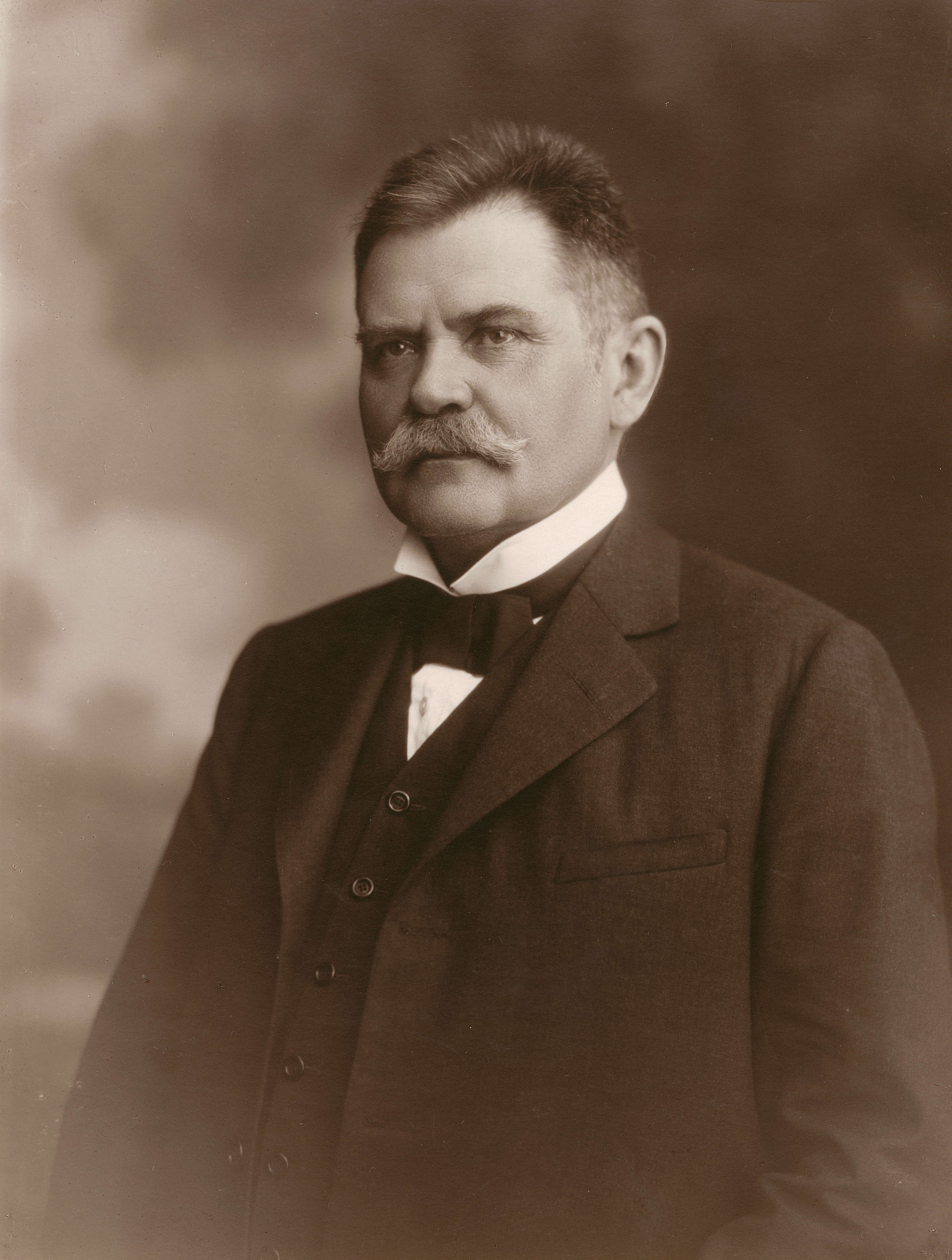
- Jakob Bleyer around 1920

Minister for National Minorities
- In office 15 August 1919 – 16 December 1920
- Preceded by: Győző Knaller
- Succeeded by: Pál Teleki (acting)

Personal details
- Born: 25 January 1874 Dunacséb, Austria-Hungary (today Čelarevo, Serbia)
- Died: 5 December 1933 (aged 59) Budapest, Hungary
- Resting place: New Public Cemetery, Budapest
- Party: KNEP (1920–1922); EP/NEP (1922–1933)
- Parent(s): Jakob Bleyer Sr. Veronika Stern
- Profession: literary scholar, politician

Jakob Bleyer (Hungarian: Bleyer Jakab; 25 January 1874 – 5 December 1933 in Budapest) was a Hungarian German studies scholar, literary scholar, MP of Hungarian-German origin, and the Hungarian Minister for National Minorities from 1919 to 1920.

== Origin and education ==
Jakob Bleyer was born into a German-speaking peasant family on 25 January 1874 in Tscheb (Dunacséb), Kingdom of Hungary, Austria-Hungary (today Čelarevo, Serbia) in the region Batschka. After attending a German elementary school, he went to the Hungarian grammar school in Neusatz and the Jesuit grammar school in Kalocsa. He studied German and Hungarian philology at the University of Budapest. In 1897, he received his doctorate with the thesis "Hungarian Relations of German Historical Folk Songs until 1551" and in the same year became a high school teacher in Budapest and Sopron (Ödenburg).

== Literary scholar ==
In 1903 and 1904, Bleyer studied at the Ludwig-Maximilians-Universität München and Leipzig University. He completed his habilitation in 1905 and then became a private lecturer at the University of Budapest. In 1908, he was appointed professor of German language and literature at the University of Cluj. In the years 1911 to 1919 and again from 1921 he held the chair for German studies at the University of Budapest.

Between 1902 and 1913 he published works on the history of literature on German-Hungarian references (see list of works). He was a corresponding member of the Hungarian Academy of Sciences since 1910. In 1926, he became a senator of the Deutsche Akademie in Munich, as well as an honorary senator and honorary doctorate from the University of Tübingen.

Several German city streets are named after him, including streets in Gerlingen, Haßmersheim, Munich , Pocking and Schwäbisch Gmünd.

== Political activities ==
In the years from 1920 to 1926 Bleyer belonged to a newly founded German-speaking People's Council, which was founded by appeals of Karl I as an attempt to save the Habsburg monarchy. From 1926 until his death, he was a member of the Hungarian Parliament. Between 15 August 1919 and 16 December 1920, Bleyer was Minister for National Minorities (Nationalities Minister) of the Christian-nationalist governments. On 21 August 1919, he issued the ordinance on equal rights for national minorities, which was intended to guarantee linguistic and cultural autonomy for these minorities. He placed a special focus on the rural population and German-speaking illiteracy.

Bleyer feared due to the increasing Magyarization a "neglect of the German-speaking minorities in the country", since in his opinion this could not be assimilated linguistically because of their low level of education. Above all, he campaigned for elementary schools for the minorities; for the German-speaking elites, he considered brief linguistic assimilation to be inevitable, as well as interference by the German Reich in Hungarian minority policy. Bleyer was politically in favor of an independent Magyar-led kingdom. In speeches and essays he emphasized that he was in favor of the Hungarian rule and did not demand, in contrast to other German people's councils like Rudolf Brandsch, an "Eastern Switzerland" with several official languages.

In January 1921 he founded the "Sunday paper for the German people in Hungary", on 15 July 19 the "Hungarian German People's Education Association" and in 1929 the “German-Hungarian Homeland Papers”. Bleyer was co-editor of the Philological Universal-Anzeiger. As a permanent delegate he represented the Hungarian-German minority in the European Nationalities Congress from 1925 until his death in 1933, in which he maintained a good relationship with German and Jewish representatives.

== Notable Descendants ==
- Annamaria Bleyer(American Ballerina)

== Writings ==
- Von der Erforschung des deutschen Kultureinflusses im südöstlichen Europa. In: Zs. Deutsche Rundschau. 53. Jg., Nov. 1926, S. 123–133.
- Beheim Mihály élete és müvei (=Leben und Werke Michael Beheims). Budapest 1902.
- Die germanischen Elemente der ungarischen Hunnensage (Habilitationsschrift).
- Gottsched hazánkban (=Gottsched in Ungarn). Budapest 1909.
- Friedrich Schlegel am Bundestag in Frankfurt. Munich 1913.
- Das Deutschtum in Rumpfungarn. Budapest 1928.

== Literatur ==
- "Bleyer Jakob". In: Österreichisches Biographisches Lexikon 1815–1950 (ÖBL). Vol. 1, Austrian Academy of Sciences, Vienna 1957, p. 93.
- Márta Fata: Jakob Bleyer, der Politiker, der für die ungardeutsche Doppelidentität kämpfte.
- Anton Treszl: Die politische Struktur des ungarländischen Deutschtums. In: Erstes ungardeutsches Biographielexikon.
- Eszter Kiséry: Jakob Bleyers Wien-These.
- Fritz Valjavec (1955). "Bleyer, Jakob". Neue Deutsche Biographie (in German). Vol. 2. Berlin: Duncker & Humblot. pp. 302–303. (full text online).
