= Mária Lebstück =

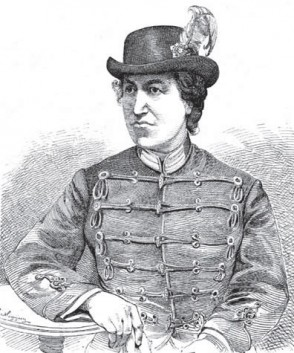
Mária Lebstück, about 1848

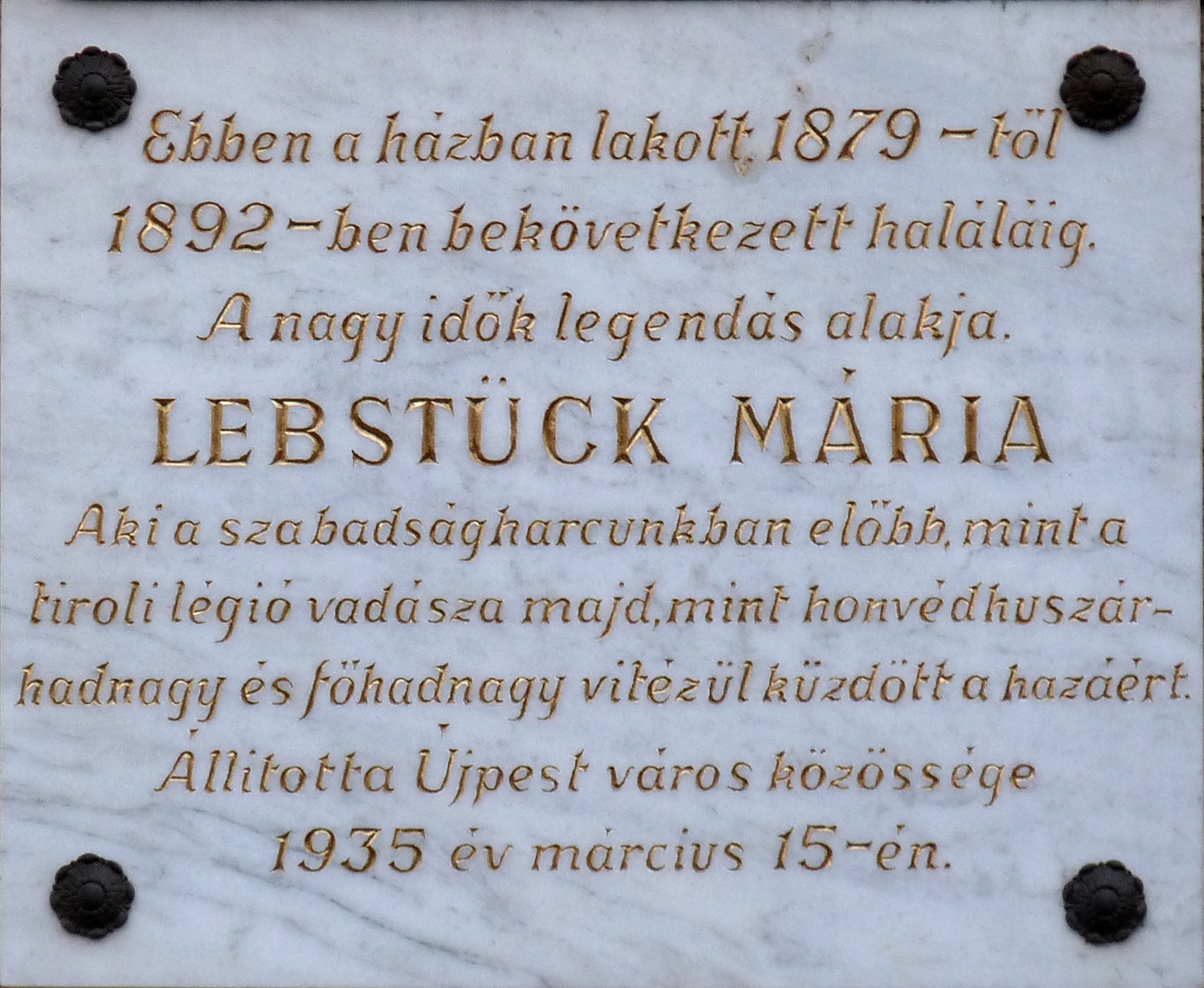
Mária Lebstück commemorative plaque in Budapest District IV, Csokonai Street No 4.

Mária Lebstück (15 August 1831 – 30 May 1892), was a Hussar officer during the Hungarian War of Independence of 1848 and 1849 under the name Károly Lebstück. She was the first woman to have been officer of the Hussar.

== Life ==
She was born into a wealthy german merchant family in Zagreb, and moved to Vienna at the age of 13 to live with her maternal uncle. In November 1848, the revolution erupted in Vienna, and the seventeen-year-old dressed herself as a man and enlisted in the universities regiment. She served in battle during the October revolution in Vienna and after in Hungarian revolution. She was wounded in battle, distinguished herself and was promoted to the rank of an officer.

In July 1849, she married. She was captured while in Buda and imprisoned. Her husband died in prison, where she gave birth to a son. She was released and banished from Hungary, moving to Croatia. In 1853, she returned to Hungary and married a man named Gyula Pasche. She lived in Komarom until his death in 1870. In 1880, she moved to Újpest with her son, where she died.

== Legacy ==
On 15 March 1935, a memorial plaquet was placed on the house of 4 Ujpest Csokonai. In 1942, she was dramatized in an operetta by Jenő Huszka and László Szilágyi.
