= Thomas Mann Gymnasium (Budapest) =

International school in Budapest, Hungary

German School Budapest – Thomas Mann Gymnasium
- Deutsche Schule Budapest – Thomas-Mann-Gymnasium

Location
- Cinege út 8/C; Budapest, 1121; Hungary

Information
- Type: German international school
- Motto: Two countries – one school – in the heart of Europe
- Established: 1990
- Principal: Carolin Schmidt
- Staff: about 70–75
- Grades: Preschool – Grade 12
- Enrolment: approximately 570
- Language: German, Hungarian, English
- Website: www.deutscheschule.hu

The German School Budapest – Thomas Mann Gymnasium (DSB) is a German-Hungarian international school located in Budapest, Hungary. It is operated by the Foundation of the German School Budapest and supported by the Central Agency for German Schools Abroad (ZfA).

The school is part of the worldwide network of more than 135 German schools abroad and has been officially recognised by the ZfA and the World Association of German Schools Abroad (WDA). It holds the quality label "Excellent German School Abroad" and has been certified as a "MINT-friendly school", due to its strong focus on science, technology, engineering and mathematics education.

Through its bilingual curriculum students can graduate with both high school diplomas, the German Abitur and Hungarian Érettségi.

== History ==
The German School Budapest was founded in 1990, reviving the tradition of German-language education in Hungary that dates back to the late 19th and early 20th centuries. A founding committee was established on 3 August 1990, and teaching began on 24 September 1990 with eleven students in grades 2–4. One week later, the first preparatory class for grade 1 started, marking the official opening of the elementary school.

The Foundation of the German School Budapest (Stiftung Deutsche Schule Budapest) was founded on 28 February 1992 by the Federal Republic of Germany, the Republic of Hungary, the German state of Baden-Württemberg and the City of Budapest. The foundation remains the legal and financial authority of the school and ensures stable long-term cooperation between the partner countries.

Since its establishment, the DSB has continuously expanded its facilities and educational programmes. Today, it serves more than 550 students from both German- and Hungarian-speaking backgrounds. The school campus in Budapest’s Buda Hills combines historical architecture with modern learning spaces, reflecting the institution’s development from a small start-up school into a comprehensive international educational centre.

== Mission and Educational Philosophy ==
The DSB defines itself as a place of intercultural learning and mutual exchange between German and Hungarian cultures. The school’s mission statement highlights values such as tolerance, responsibility, openness and respect, and aims to educate students to become open-minded and globally responsible citizens.

As a recognised German school abroad, the DSB promotes future-oriented education through digital learning, collaborative teaching methods and close teacher-student interaction. Individual support, language acquisition and intercultural competence are considered central pillars of the educational philosophy.

Through a bilingual and bicultural approach, the DSB seeks to strengthen understanding between Germany and Hungary, and to prepare its students for academic, social and professional challenges in an international environment.

== Academic Structure and Qualifications ==
The DSB offers an educational pathway from preschool to grade 12. It is divided into a primary school (grades 1–4) and a secondary school (Gymnasium) (grades 5–12). Students can follow two educational branches:

- The German branch, which follows the German curriculum and leads to the Deutsches Abitur.
- The Hungarian branch, where instruction includes additional subjects in Hungarian literature, history and science, enabling students to obtain both the German and the Hungarian school-leaving certificates (Abitur and Érettségi).

From grade 9 onwards, students from both branches are taught together in bilingual classes. The curriculum integrates foreign languages such as English, French and Spanish, as well as elective subjects in arts, science and technology.

== Awards and Recognition ==
The DSB has been certified as a MINT-friendly school, acknowledging its commitment to science, technology, engineering and mathematics education. It is part of the worldwide network of over 135 German schools abroad supported by the ZfA and represented by the World Association of German Schools Abroad (WDA). This recognition confirms its quality standards in teaching, intercultural education and school development.

== Extracurricular Life ==
Extracurricular activities are an important part of school life at the DSB. Students can participate in art and music programmes, theatre and dance productions, the school band or the choir; furthermore students are ecouraged to take part in competitions, such as Jugend forscht or Jugend musiziert.

The school also participates in international exchange and cultural programmes and student trips to Germany and other countries, strengthening European cooperation and youth engagement.

Annual cultural events such as the Advent Bazaar, the graduation ceremony (Ballagás) or Sommerfest are key community traditions.

== Facilities ==
The campus of the DSB is located in the Buda Hills at Cinege út 8/C, in the 12th District of Budapest. It combines historic and modern architecture, with classrooms equipped with Smart Boards and digital learning tools. Facilities include science laboratories, computer rooms, a well-equipped library, a sports hall and outdoor spaces for recreation and athletics.

== Tuition and Fees ==
Tuition fees and registration costs are set out in the annually updated fee regulations, available on the school’s official website.

== Staff ==
Around 70–75 teachers work at the DSB. Some are seconded by the ZfA and the German federal states, particularly Baden-Württemberg, while others are employed locally in Hungary.

== Alumni ==
The DSB maintains an active alumni association that connects former and current students, teachers and parents. It supports networking, mentorship and cooperation between generations, reflecting the school’s ongoing community spirit.
