= Csiki =

Csiki is a Hungarian surname. Notable people with the surname include:

- Anna Csiki (born 1999), Hungarian footballer
- Ernő Csíki (1875–1954), Hungarian entomologist
- Norbert Csiki (born 1991), Hungarian footballer
