= Neues Budapester Abendblatt =

Neues Budapester Abendblatt was a liberal German-language daily newspaper, published from Budapest, Hungary. The last issue of the newspaper was published on January 7, 1922.
