= Tamás Wittinghoff =

Hungarian civil engineer and politician (born 1958)

Tamás Wittinghoff (born 9 September 1958) is a Hungarian civil engineer, politician, who has been the mayor of Budaörs since 1991.

== Career ==
He received his degree from the Faculty of Civil Engineering of Budapest University of Technology in 1984. Before the fall of communism, he worked as a construction engineer on water supply and sewage treatment systems, and environmental protection projects.

He was first elected as mayor of Budaörs in February 1991. During the 2006 municipal elections, he was appointed to the Pest County Assembly. He is a founding member of the Board of Trustees of the Pest County Business Development Foundation. He is a council member of Budaörs Fejlődéséért Egyesület (For the Development of Budaörs Association) since 2010. He personally officiated the fifth wedding of former Mayor of Budapest Gábor Demszky in 2018. He got involved in a sex scandal right before the 2019 municipal elections. However, he later won again with a remarkably high 71.65% of votes.

=== His mayoral terms ===
István Csathó was elected as the first mayor of Budaörs after the fall of communism, but he resigned shortly after. Since February 1991 Tamás Wittinghoff has been the mayor of the town. Wittinghoff got 31.24% of the votes (1792) in the 1994 municipal elections, allowing him to start his second term as mayor.

He was once again elected with 56.40% of the votes (4426) in 1998. The SZDSZ-MSZP coalition gained a majority of 7 seats in the 17-seats city council, followed by Fidesz-MDF with 4 seats. During the 2002 municipal elections, Tamás Wittinghoff won again with 55.13% (6087) of the votes. The coalition of SZDSZ-MSZP achieved an absolute majority in the city council with 9 seats.

The 2006 municipal elections saw Tamás Wittinghoff win 58.14% (6868) of total votes. The now 23-seats city council was divided by Fidesz-KDNP (10 seats) and SZDSZ-MSZP (10 seats).

Wittinghoff got 60.26% of votes during the 2010 municipal elections. In the city council (14 seats) Fidesz-KDNP had a majority (8 seats), Wittinghoff's For the Development of Budaörs Association (BFE) got 4 seats; the remaining two seats were shared by MSZP and Jobbik.

The 2014 municipal elections once again brought victory for Wittinghoff, having won 69.31% (8029) of the votes. BFE got an absolute majority of 10 seats, winning all the individual constituencies.

Tamás Wittinghoff started his 7th term of mayoralty after the 2019 municipal elections after winning 71.65% of votes, his highest ratio so far. BFE once again won absolute majority in the city council by winning all the individual constituencies and securing 10 seats.

=== Results of the municipal elections ===
- 1990–199?: István Csathó (unknown)
- 1991–1994: Tamás Wittinghoff (SZDSZ)
- 1994–1998: Tamás Wittinghoff (SZDSZ)
- 1998–2002: Tamás Wittinghoff (SZDSZ-MSZP)
- 2002–2006: Tamás Wittinghoff (SZDSZ-MSZP)
- 2006–2010: Tamás Wittinghoff (SZDSZ-MSZP)
- 2010–2014: Tamás Wittinghoff (Budaörs Fejlődéséért Egyesület)
- 2014–2019: Tamás Wittinghoff (Budaörs Fejlődéséért Egyesület)
- 2019-: Tamás Wittinghoff (Budaörs Fejlődéséért Egyesület)

== Awards ==
- 2004: Knight's Cross of the Hungarian Order of Merit
- 2005: Defence Ministerial Award for his work for the Peace Park and Military Cemetery in memory of the victims of the Second World War

== Sources ==
- wittinghofftamas.hu (in Hungarian)
