= Ottó Heinek =

Hungarian journalist and politician (1960–2018)

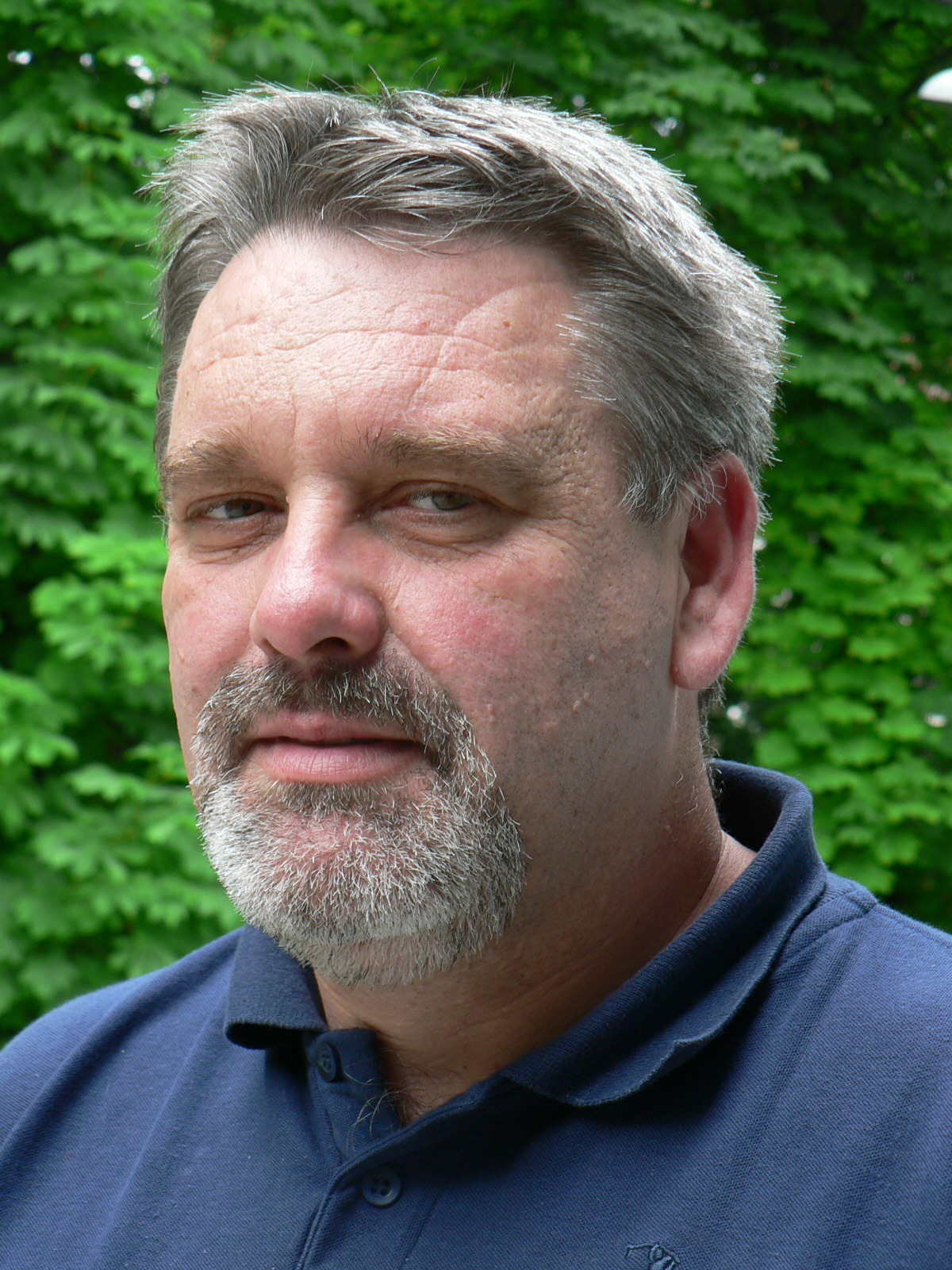
- Heinek in 2006

Chairman of the National Self-Government of Germans in Hungary
- In office 17 January 1999 – 20 August 2018
- Succeeded by: Olívia Schubert

Personal details
- Born: 6 February 1960 Mohács, Hungary
- Died: 20 August 2018 (aged 58) Budapest, Hungary
- Party: MNOÖ
- Education: Janus Pannonius University
- Profession: Journalist, politician

Ottó Heinek (German: Otto Heinek; 6 February 1960 – 20 August 2018) was a Hungarian journalist and politician who served as Chairman of the National Self-Government of Germans in Hungary (MNOÖ) from 1999 until his death in 2018.

== Biography ==
Heinek was born in Mohács. He finished his elementary studies in Borjád. He graduated from the Leöwey Klára Grammar School of Pécs in 1978. After compulsory military service, he attended the Janus Pannonius University, where he learnt German studies and earned a degree in 1983. He worked as a journalist for the German-language newspaper Neue Zeitung between 1983 and 1990. Meanwhile, he attended the Hungarian School of Journalism, which runs under the aegis of the National Association of Hungarian Journalists (MÚOSZ).

Following the transition to multi-party democracy, he worked in the Prime Minister's Office, where he functioned as Government Counselor at the National Ethnic and Minority Office. He became vice-chairman of the government body by 1995. Heinek was one of the founding members of the National Self-Government of Germans in Hungary (MNOÖ), which was established on 11 March 1995. He was elected Deputy Chairman of MNOÖ in the inaugural congress, he served in this capacity until 17 January 1999, when he was elected Chairman. He was re-elected in 2003, 2007, 2011 and 2015.

He was elected spokesperson of the German national minority during the 2014 Hungarian parliamentary election, but resigned from this position before the inauguration of the new plenary session. He was replaced by Imre Ritter.
