= List of Croatian exonyms for places in Hungary =

This is a list of Croatian exonyms for cities, towns, and villages located in Hungary. They are place names used in Croatian that differ from the corresponding names used in Hungarian.

While some of these exonyms – such as Budimpešta for Budapest and Pečuh for Pécs – are widely used in Croatian, most of them are used exclusively by the Croatian minority in Hungary and, as of the early 21st century, many of them are either historical or used only by the elderly members of the community.

== Bács-Kiskun County (Bačko-kiškunska županija) ==
=== Bácsalmás Subregion (Aljmaški kotar) ===
- Bácsalmás: Aljmaš, Bačaljmaš
- Bácsszőlős: Prlković, Perleković, Crvena šuma
- Mátételke: Matević

=== Baja Subregion (Bajski kotar) ===
- Bácsbokod: Bikić
- Bácsborsód: Boršot
- Bácsszentgyörgy: Đurić
- Bátmonostor: Monoštorlija
- Dávod: Dautovo
- Dunafalva: Topolovac
- Érsekcsanád: Čanad, Čenad
- Érsekhalma: Loma
- Felsőszentiván: Gornji Sveti Ivan, Gornji Sentivan
- Hercegszántó: Santovo
- Nagybaracska: Baračka
- Nemesnádudvar: Dudvar, Nadvar
- Rém: Rim
- Sükösd: Čikuzda
- Szeremle: Srimljan
- Vaskút: Baškut

=== Jánoshalm Subregion (Jankovački kotar) ===
- Jánoshalma: Jankovac
- Kéleshalom: Kilaš
- Mélykút: Miljkut

=== Kalocsa Subregion (Kalački kotar) ===
- Bátya: Baćin, Baćino
- Drágszél: Draga
- Dunaszentbenedek: Sabendak
- Dunatetétlen: Tatilan
- Fajsz: Fajsin
- Foktő: Voktov
- Géderlak: Gider
- Harta: Hartava, Karta
- Homokmégy: Mieđa
- Kalocsa: Kalača, Kaloča
- Miske: Miška
- Öregcsertő: Čerta
- Solt: Šolta
- Szakmár: Kmara
- Uszód: Vusad

=== Kecskemét Subregion (Kečkemetski kotar) ===
- Kecskemét: Kečkemet, Kečkemit

=== Kiskőrös Subregion (Kireški kotar) ===
- Császártöltés: Tetiš, Tuotiš
- Csengőd: Čengid
- Imrehegy: Delavnjača
- Kecel: Keceja, Kecielj
- Kiskőrös: Kireš, Kereša
- Soltvadkert: Vakier
- Tabdi: Tobdin

=== Kiskunhalas Subregion (Olaški kotar) ===
- Balotaszállás: Blato
- Harkakötöny: Kotinj
- Kelebia: Kelebija
- Kiskunhalas: Olaš, Halaš
- Kisszállás: Salašica
- Kunfehértó: Fertov, Vertov
- Pirtó: Pirtov

=== Kiskunmajsa Subregion (Kiškunmajski kotar) ===
- Kömpöc: Kempac, Kompac

=== Kunszentmiklós Subregion (Kunsentmikloški kotar) ===
- Apostag: Štagara
- Dunavecse: Večica

== Baranya County (Baranjska županija) ==
=== Komló Subregion (Komlovski kotar) ===
- Bodolyabér: Đabir
- Hegyhátmaróc: Maroca
- Hosszúhetény: Hetinj, Etinj, Hetin, Jetin
- Köblény: Kubin
- Komló: Komlov
- Magyaregregy: Gređa
- Magyarszék: Sika
- Mecsekpölöske: Pliške
- Szalatnak: Slatnik
- Szárász: Sras
- Tófű: Tofij
- Vékény: Vikinj

=== Mohács Subregion (Mohački kotar) ===
- Babarc: Babrac
- Bár: Bar, Švapčaluk
- Belvárdgyula: Belvar, Belavar
- Bóly: Boja
- Borjád: Borjat
- Dunaszekcső: Sečuv, Sečuj, Sečuh
- Erdősmárok: Marok
- Feked: Feketić, Fejket
- Geresdlak: Gereš
- Görcsönydoboka: Duboka, Garčin, Gerčin
- Hásságy: Ašađ
- Himesháza: Imeš, Imešaz, Nemišaz, Nimeš
- Homorúd: Kalinjača, Vomrud
- Kisbudmér: Mali Budmir
- Kisnyárád: Narad, Šnarad
- Lánycsók: Lančug, Lančuk
- Lippó: Lipovo
- Liptód: Litoba
- Majs: Majša, Majiš
- Máriakéménd: Kemed
- Monyoród: Minjorod
- Nagybudmér: Veliki Budmir
- Nagynyárád: Veliki Narad, Narad, Jarad, Njarad, Narod, Njarod
- Palotabozsok: Božuk
- Sátorhely: Šatorišće, Šatorište
- Somberek: Šumberak, Šumbrig
- Szajk: Sajka
- Szebény: Sebinj, Sevenj, Sebin
- Szederkény: Surdukinj, Surgetin
- Töttös: Titoš
- Udvar: Dvor
- Véménd: Vemen, Vimen
- Versend: Vršenda

=== Pécs Subregion (Pečuški kotar) ===
- Aranyosgadány: Ranjoš
- Baksa: Bokšica
- Bosta: Boštin
- Bogád: Bogadin, Borovo
- Egerág: Egrag, Jegrag
- Ellend: Elen, Lenda
- Görcsöny: Garčin
- Gyód: Đoda
- Keszü: Kesuj, Kesa, Kesin
- Kisherend: Renda
- Kozármisleny: Mišljen
- Kökény: Kukinj
- Kővágószőlős: Kovasiluš
- Lothárd: Lotar
- Magyarsarlós: Šaroš
- Nagykozár: Kozar
- Ócsárd: Ovčar
- Pécs: Pečuh
- Pécsudvard: Udvar
- Pogány: Pogan
- Regenye: Reginja
- Romonya: Rumenja
- Szőke: Suka
- Szőkéd: Sukit
- Tengeri: Tengarin
- Téseny: Tišnja

=== Pécsvárad Subregion (Pečvarski kotar) ===
- Apátvarasd: Varažda
- Berkesd: Berkuš
- Erdősmecske: Mečka
- Erzsébet: Setržebet
- Fazekasboda: Bodica
- Hidas: Idoš
- Kékesd: Kikoš, Kekeš
- Lovászhetény: Jetinj
- Martonfa: Martofa, Mortona
- Mecseknádasd: Nadoš, Nadaš
- Nagypall: Palija
- Ófalu: Faluv
- Pécsvárad: Pečvar
- Pereked: Prekad
- Szellő: Seluv
- Zengővárkony: Vakonja

=== Sásd Subregion (Šaški kotar) ===
- Bikal: Bikala
- Gerényes: Grenjiš
- Gödre: Đudre
- Mekényes: Mekinjiš, Mekinjaš
- Oroszló: Raslovo
- Sásd: Šaš
- Tékes: Tikeš
- Vásárosdombó: Dubovac

=== Sellye Subregion (Šeljinski kotar) ===
- Baranyahídvég: Idvik
- Bogdása: Bogdašin
- Csányoszró: Ostrovo
- Drávafok: Fok, Fokrta
- Drávaiványi: Ivanidba
- Drávakeresztúr: Križevce
- Drávasztára: Starin
- Felsőszentmárton: Martince, Martinci
- Kórós: Korša
- Markóc: Markovce
- Marócsa: Marača, Maroč
- Okorág: Okrag
- Piskó: Piškiba
- Sellye: Šeljin
- Sósvertike: Vertiga, Vertika
- Vajszló: Vajslovo
- Vejti: Vejtiba, Vertiba
- Zaláta: Zalat

=== Siklós Subregion (Šikloški kotar) ===
- Alsószentmárton: Semartin
- Babarcszőlős: Pabac, Babac
- Beremend: Breme, Brime
- Bisse: Bišira
- Csarnóta: Crnota
- Diósviszló: Visov
- Drávacsehi: Čeja
- Drávapalkonya: Palkanja
- Drávaszabolcs: Saboč, Sabloč
- Drávaszerdahely: Sredalj
- Egyházasharaszti
- Garé: Girija
- Gordisa: Grdiša
- Harkány: Harkanj, Arkanj
- Illocska: Iločac
- Ipacsfa: Pačva
- Ivánbattyán: Ivanj
- Kisdér: Dirovo, Kizdir
- Kisharsány: Aršanjac
- Kisjakabfalva: Jakubovo
- Kiskassa: Kaša
- Kislippó: Lipovica
- Kistapolca: Tapoca
- Kistótfalu: Tofaluba, Kišfalov
- Kovácshida: Kovačida
- Lapáncsa: Lapandža
- Magyarbóly: Madžarboja
- Márfa: Marva
- Matty: Maća
- Nagyharsány: Aršanj
- Nagytótfalu: Veliko Selo, Tofala, Totovala
- Old: Oldince, Olnica
- Palkonya: Plakinja, Palkonija
- Pécsdevecser: Devčar
- Peterd: Peterda
- Siklós: Šikloš
- Siklósnagyfalu: Naćfa
- Szaporca: Spornica
- Tésenfa: Tišna
- Túrony: Turon
- Újpetre: Petra, Racpetra
- Villánykövesd: Keveša, Kovaš
- Vokány: Vakan

=== Szentlőrinc Subregion (Selurinački kotar) ===
- Bicsérd: Bičir, Bičer
- Bükkösd: Bikeš
- Csonkamindszent: Senta
- Dinnyeberki: Breka
- Gerde: Gredara
- Gyöngyfa: Natfara
- Helesfa: Eleš
- Hetvehely: Tević
- Okorvölgy: Korvođa
- Szentlőrinc: Selurinac, Selovrenac, Selurac, Selurince, Selerenac
- Velény: Valinje, Valinjevo
- Zók: Zuka

=== Szigetvár Subregion (Sigetski kotar) ===
- Almamellék: Mamelik
- Basal: Bašalija
- Boldogasszonyfa: Gospojinci
- Botykapeterd: Botka
- Bürüs: Biriš
- Csebény: Čebinj
- Csertő: Čerta
- Dencsháza: Denčaz
- Endrőc: Andrec, Androc
- Gyöngyösmellék: Meljek, Mejek
- Hobol: Oboj, Vobol
- Horváthertelend: Ertelen, Retlenda, Hertalan
- Ibafa: Ibaba
- Kétújfalu: Ujfaluba, Ufaluba, Vujfaluba
- Magyarlukafa: Luka
- Merenye: Mrnja, Meren
- Mozsgó: Možgaj, Možgov
- Molvány: Molvan, Molvar
- Nagypeterd: Petreda
- Nyugotszenterzsébet: Sentžebet
- Patapoklosi: Pokloša
- Pettend: Petan
- Rózsafa: Biduš
- Somogyapáti: Opat
- Somogyhárságy: Rašađ
- Somogyviszló: Vislovo
- Szentdénes: Sedijanaš
- Szentlászló: Laslov
- Szigetvár: Siget
- Szörény: Surinj
- Teklafalu: Dekla
- Tótszentgyörgy: Seđuđ

== Csongrád County (Čongradska županija) ==
- Deszk: Deška
- Hódmezővásárhely: Vašarelj, Vašarhelj
- Szeged: Segedin
- Szőreg: Sirig

== Zala County (Zalska/Zaladska županija) ==
=== Keszthely Subregion (Kestelski kotar) ===
- Keszthely: Kestel, Monoštor

=== Lenti Subregrion (Lentibski kotar) ===
- Csömödér: Čemeder
- Dobri: Dobriba
- Iklódbördőce: Bredica
- Kerkateskánd: Teškan
- Lendvadedes: Didaš
- Lenti: Lentiba
- Lovászi: Lovasiba
- Pördefölde: Predafeda
- Tormafölde: Tormafed
- Tornyiszentmiklós: Mikuš, Sumikluš

=== Letenye Subregion (Letinjski kotar) ===
- Bánokszentgyörgy: Benesedžodž
- Bázakerettye: Kerek
- Becsehely: Bečehel
- Borsfa: Borša
- Csörnyeföld: Černja
- Kerkaszentkirály: Kralevec
- Kiscsehi: Čejiba
- Kistolmács: Tulmač
- Letenye: Letinja
- Lispeszentadorján: Lupša, Vudrijan
- Maróc: Marovec
- Molnári: Mlinarce, Minarce
- Muraszemenye: Semenince
- Oltárc: Ultarc, Ultarec
- Petrivente: Petriba
- Semjénháza: Postara, Pustara
- Szentliszló: Senislov
- Tótszentmárton: Somarton, Sumarton
- Tótszerdahely: Serdahel, Serdehel
- Valkonya: Vlakinja
- Várfölde: Varfed(a)
- Zajk: Sajka

=== Nagykanizsa Subregion (Velikokaniški kotar) ===
- Belezna: Blezna
- Eszteregnye: Strugna
- Liszó: Lisov
- Nagykanizsa: Kan(j)iža, Velika Kan(j)iža
- Rigyác: Redžac, Ridžac
- Semjénháza: Postara, Pustara
- Sormás: Šurmaš
- Surd: Šur, Šurda
- Szepetnek: Sepetnik

=== Zalaegerszeg Subregion (Jagarsečki kotar) ===
- Zalaegerszeg: Jagarsek, Jagersek

=== Zalakaros Subregion (Zalakaroški kotar) ===
- Zalakomár: Kumar

== Uncategorized ==
- Budapest: Budimpešta
- Debrecen: Debrecin
- Esztergom: Ostrogon
- Győr: Jura, Đura, Vjura
- Komárom: Komoran
- Lórév: Lovra
- Ráckeve: Kovin
- Szentendre: Sentandrija, Sv. Andrija
- Székesfehérvár: Stolni Biograd
- Veszprém: Vesprim, Besprim

== Sources ==
- Mandić, Živko (2005). "Hrvatska imena naseljenih mjesta u Madžarskoj" [Croatian Names of Inhabited Places in Hungary] (PDF). Folia onomastica Croatica (in Croatian) (14). Zagreb: Croatian Academy of Sciences and Arts: 37–128.
