= Szigetvár District =

Szigetvár District Szigetvári járás
- Districts of Hungary
- Coat of arms

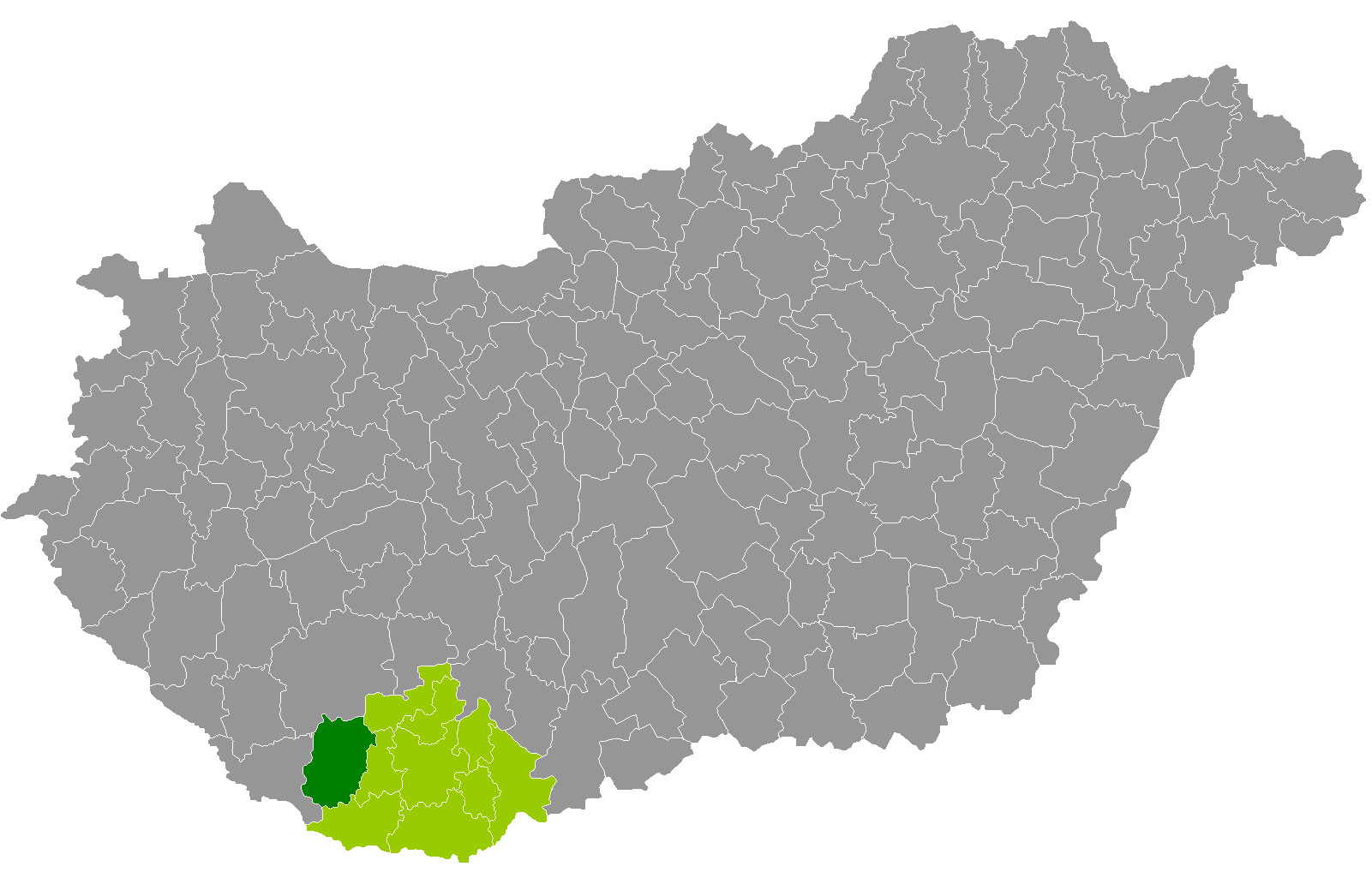
- Szigetvár District within Hungary and Baranya County.
- Coordinates: 46.05°N 17.80°E
- Country: Hungary
- County: Baranya
- District seat: Szigetvár

Area
  - Total: 656.76 km^{2} (253.58 sq mi)
  - Rank: 1st in Baranya

Population (2011 census)
  - Total: 25,002
  - Rank: 5th in Baranya
  - Density: 38/km^{2} (98/sq mi)

Szigetvár (Hungarian: Szigetvári járás) is a district in western part of Baranya County, Hungary. Szigetvár is also the name of the town where the district seat is located. The district lies in the Southern Transdanubia Statistical Region.

== Geography ==
Szigetvár District borders with Kaposvár District (Somogy County) to the north, Hegyhát District and Szentlőrinc District to the east, Sellye District to the south, Barcs District (Somogy County) to the west. The number of the inhabited places in Szigetvár District is 45.

== Municipalities ==
The district has 1 town and 44 villages. (ordered by population, as of 1 January 2012)

- Almamellék (428)
- Almáskeresztúr (83)
- Basal (202)
- Bánfa (187)
- Boldogasszonyfa (426)
- Botykapeterd (312)
- Bürüs (97)
- Csebény (94)
- Csertő (403)
- Dencsháza (591)
- Endrőc (353)
- Gyöngyösmellék (283)
- Hobol (985)
- Horváthertelend (78)
- Ibafa (237)
- Katádfa (176)
- Kétújfalu (673)
- Kisdobsza (238)
- Kistamási (135)
- Magyarlukafa (81)
- Merenye (270)
- Molvány (182)
- Mozsgó (1,043)
- Nagydobsza (668)
- Nagypeterd (649)
- Nagyváty (341)
- Nemeske (244)
- Nyugotszenterzsébet (243)
- Patapoklosi (322)
- Pettend (149)
- Rózsafa (368)
- Somogyapáti (501)
- Somogyhatvan (334)
- Somogyhárságy (434)
- Somogyviszló (252)
- Szentegát (396)
- Szentlászló (843)
- **Szigetvár** (10,772) – district seat
- Szörény (65)
- Szulimán (216)
- Teklafalu (317)
- Tótszentgyörgy (166)
- Várad (111)
- Vásárosbéc (178)
- Zádor (325)

The bolded municipality is city.

== See also ==
- List of cities and towns in Hungary
