= Somogyapáti =

- Village (Falva)
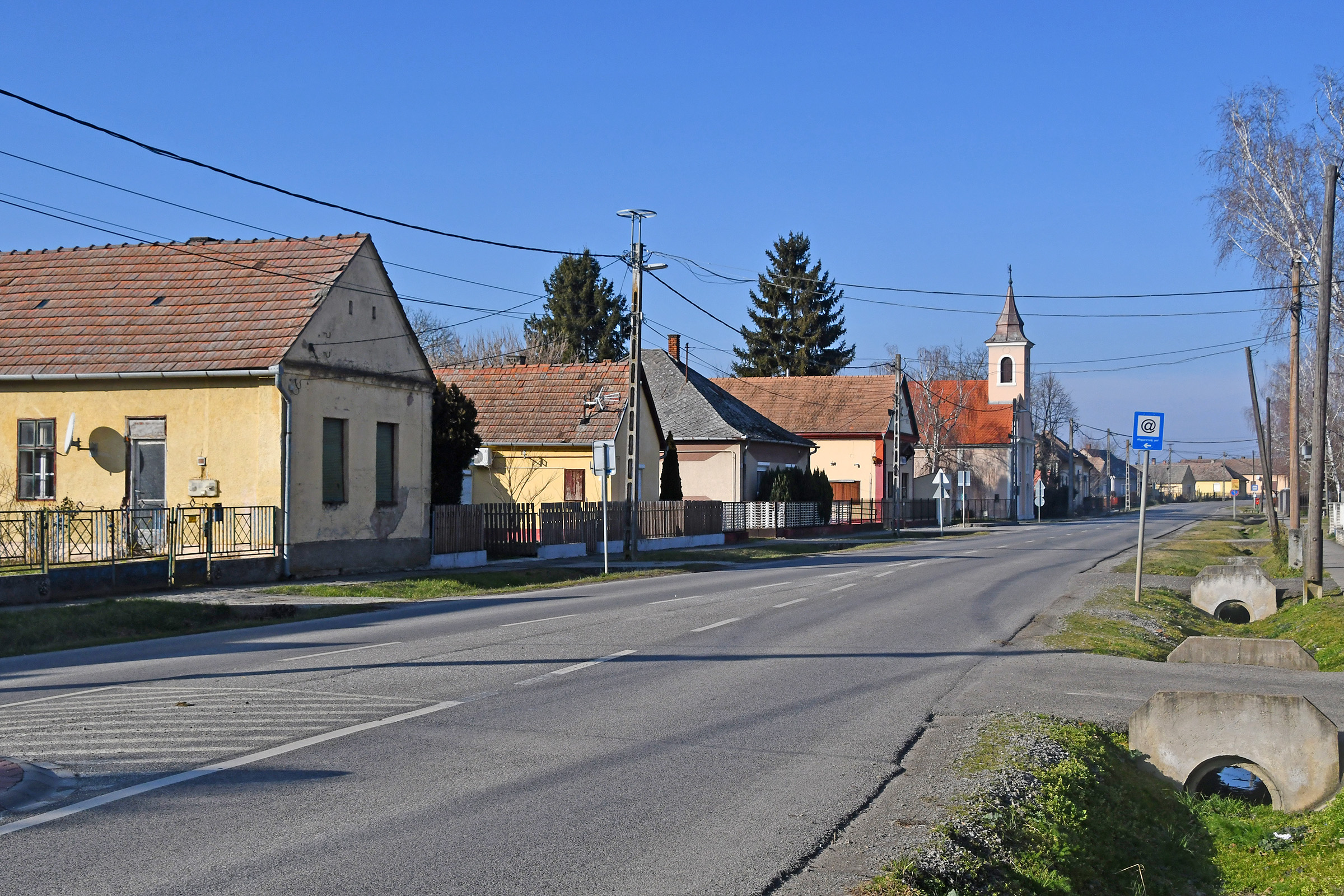

- Location of Baranya county in Hungary

- Location of Somogyapáti
- Coordinates: 46.09473°N 17.74972°E
- Country: Hungary
- County: Baranya

Area
  - Total: 10.07 km^{2} (3.89 sq mi)

Population (2004)
  - Total: 562
  - Density: 55.8/km^{2} (145/sq mi)
- Time zone: UTC+1 (CET)
  - Summer (DST): UTC+2 (CEST)
- Postal code: 7922
- Area code: 73

Somogyapáti (Croatian: Opat) is a village in the subregion of Szigetvár, Baranya county, Hungary.

== Etymology ==
The current name is a composition of Somogy which marks its former county, and apáti which means "the property of (the) abbey".

== History ==
According to László Szita the settlement was completely Hungarian in the 18th century.

== Location ==
The village is situated in the north-western corner of Baranya county, 7 kilometre (4.3 mi) northwest of Szigetvár and 42 kilometre (26 mi) west of Pécs on paved roadway. It is surrounded by Somogyviszló and Vásárosbéc on the north, Csertő on the east, Basal on the northeast, Patapoklosi on the south, Merenye on the southwest and Somogyhatvan on the west.

== Structure ==
Somogyapáti divides into three larger units, including Somogyapáti itself and two minor settlements on the outskirts named Adorjánpuszta and Dióspuszta. The last one, however does not form a singular body and consists of Zimány and Hitmes as well.

== Geography ==
Its territory is mildly hilly and is the south-end part of a hilly region called Zselic. Somogyapáti and Adorjánpuszta, both situated on hilltops, are on the opposite banks of the creek Keleti-Gyöngyös. In the 1960s a dam have been built to impound this creek for irrigation purposes, creating a 105-hectare (259-acre) artificial lake of which area partly belongs to Somogyviszló. Its original cubic capacity was 2.3 hm³ with the average depth being 2.2 metre (7.2 foot). The lake serves as a fishpond nowadays.

== Administration ==
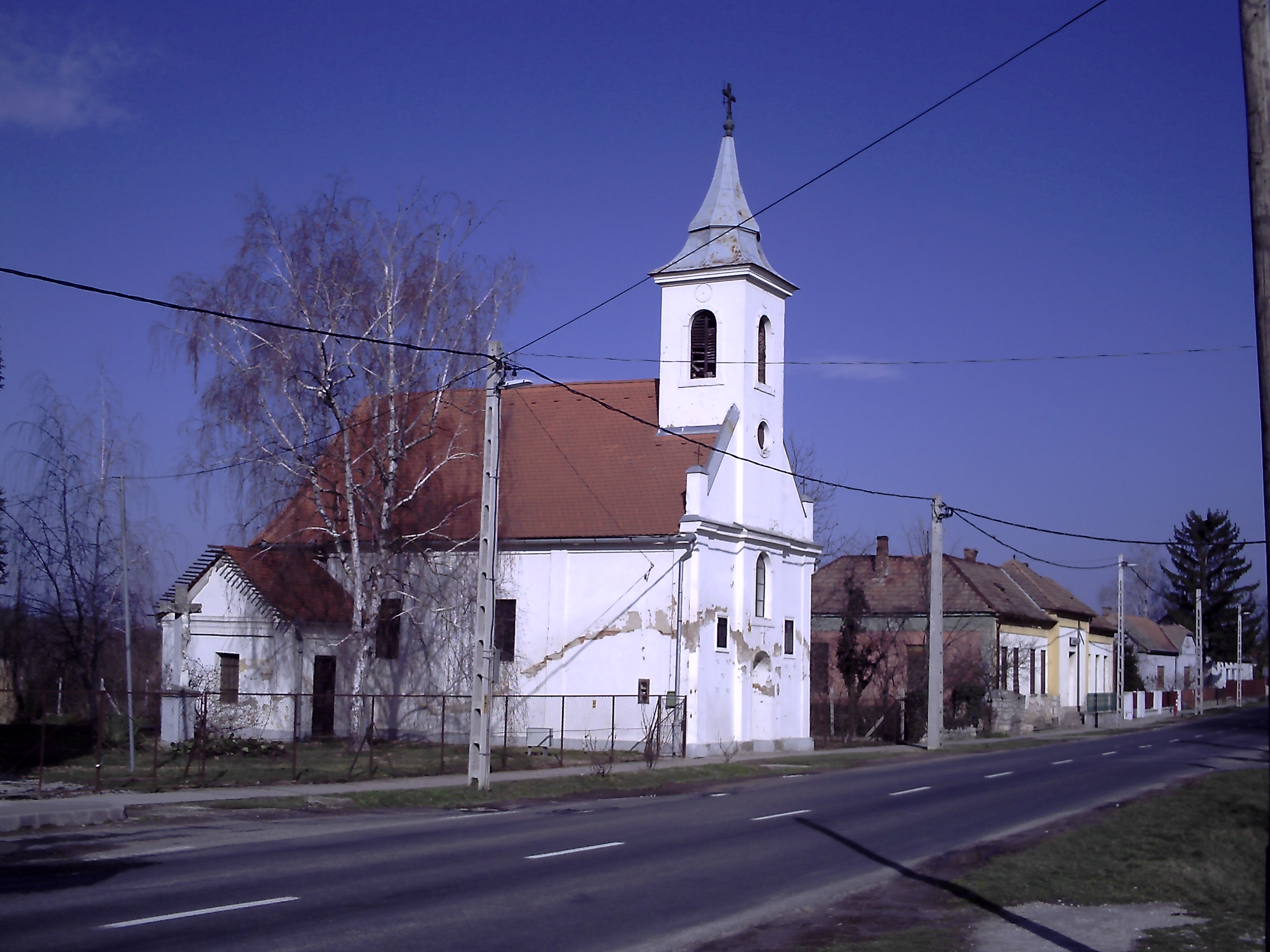
Roman Catholic Church, Main Street, Somogyapáti

Basal, Patapoklosi, Somogyapáti, Somogyhatvan and Somogyviszló share a common notary public, with their office being in Somogyapáti.

== History ==
The area have been populated since the ancient times. Artifacts, such as refined stone tools and fragments of ceramics have been found marking that elements of Linear Pottery and Lengyel cultures were present in the region.

The name of the village appears in several charters as Apati dating back to 1322.

In the 16th century the territory became the part of Ottoman Hungary, therefore lost all of its inhabitants. The village have been refounded in the 18th century with some of the pioneers being Slavic people.

The village had been corporated into Somogy until 1950.
