= Sziget =

The word sziget means island in Hungarian. It can also refer to:

== Localities ==
- Szigetvár, town in Hungary
- Sighetu Marmației/Máramarossziget, city in Romania

== Other ==
- Sziget Festival, an international annual pop/rock festival organised on Hajógyári-sziget (Shipyard Island), Óbuda, Budapest
