= Croatian exonyms =

Croatian exonyms are geographic place names outside of Croatia which differ from the name used locally or officially. These are often native names that were used in ancient times but are no longer used in the native language.

This list includes current and historical exonyms, as exonym use varies over time. As an example, Carigrad is a disused exonym for Istanbul, which replaced an even older exonym, Stambol. Croatian exonyms continue to be defined even in the modern day, as one research illustrated over the debate over the pronunciation and declension of Qatar (Katar in Croatian) after it hosted a water polo championship in the 2010s.

Language	Native name	Croatian exonym
Albania Albanija
Albanian	Durrës	Drač
Albanian	Shkodër	Skadar
Algeria Alžir
Arabic	Al-Ŷazā'ir	Alžir
Arabic	Wahrān	Oran
Armenia Armenija
Armenian	Yerevan	Erevan
Austria Austrija
German	Bruck an der Leitha	Bruk na Lajti
German	Eisenstadt	Željezno
German	Graz	Gradac (historical), Gradec (historical)
German	Kittsee	Gijeca
German	Neusiedl am See	Niuzalj
German	Wien	Beč
German	Wiener Neustadt	Bečko Novo Mjesto
Bulgaria Bugarska
China Kina
Chinese	Běijīng	Peking
Chinese	Xiānggǎng	Hong Kong
Chinese	Táibĕi	Taipei
Cuba Kuba
Spanish	Habana	Havana
Cyprus Cipar
Greek - Turkish	Lefkosía - Lefkoșa	Nikozija
Czech Republic Češka Republika
Czech	Dobré Pole	Dobro Polje
Czech	Hradec Králové	Kraljičin Gradac
Czech	Jevišovka	Frielištof
Czech	Nový Přerov	Nova Prerava
Czech	Praha	Prag
Czech	Ústí nad Labem	Ústí na Labi
Denmark Danska
Danish	København	Kopenhagen
Egypt Egipat
Arabic	Al-Iskandariyya	Aleksandrija
Arabic	Qāhirah	Kairo
Arabic	Suways	Suez
Arabic	Uqsur	Luksor
France Francuska
French	Marseille	Marijanin
French	Nice	Nica
French	Paris	Pariz
Germany Njemačka
German	Bautzen	Budišin
German	Dresden	Dražđane (historical)
German	Leipzig	Lipsko (historical)
German	München	Monakov (historical)
Greece Grčka
Greek	Athína	Atena
Greek	Édessa	Voden
Greek	Ermoúpoli	Ermoupolis
Greek	Flórina	Lerin
Greek	Igoumenítsa	Igumenica
Greek	Ikaría	Ikarija
Greek	Ioánnina	Janina
Greek	Irákleion	Heraklion
Greek	Kýthira	Kitera
Greek	Kérkyra	Krf
Greek	Kórinthos	Korint
Greek	Kozáni	Kožani
Greek	Pátra	Patras
Greek	Peiraiás	Pirej
Greek	Thessaloníki	Solun
Greek	Véroia	Ber
Hungary Mađarska / Madžarska
Hungarian	Croatian Exonyms for Places in Hungary	Croatian Exonyms for Places in Hungary
India Indija
Hindi - English	Kolkata	Kalkuta
Italy Italija
Italian	Ancona	Jakin
Italian	Bolzano	Bocen
Italian	Gorizia	Gorica
Italian	Monfalcone	Tržić
Italian	Muggia	Milje
Italian	Napoli	Napulj
Italian	Roma	Rim
Italian	Trento	Trident
Italian	Trieste	Trst
Italian	Udine	Videm (historical?) (Slovenian exonym)
Israel Izrael
Hebrew - Arabic	Be'er Sheva - Bi'r as-Sab	Beer Šeba
Hebrew - Arabic	Yerushaláyim - Al-Quds	Jeruzalem
Hebrew - Arabic	Yériho - Ariha	Jerihon
Hebrew - Arabic	Kafar Nahum - Talhum	Kafarnaum
Hebrew - Arabic	Natzrát - Naseriyye	Nazaret
Hebrew - Arabic	Tverya - Ţabariyyah	Tiberijada
Lebanon Libanon
Libya Libija
Arabic	Ţarābulus	Tripoli
Mali Mali
French	Tombouctou	Timbuktu
Moldova Moldavija
Romanian	Chișinău	Kišinjev
Morocco Maroko
Arabic	Fās	Fes
Arabic	Ţanja	Tanger
Nepal Nepal
Nepali	Kantipur	Katmandu
Netherlands Nizozemska
North Macedonia Sjeverna Makedonija
Macedonian	Bitola	Bitolj
Macedonian	Gevgelija	Đevđelija
Macedonian	Skopje	Skoplje
Oman Oman
Arabic	Masqaț	Muskat
Palestine Palestina
Arabic - Hebrew	Al-Khalīl - Hevron	Hebron
Poland Poljska
Portugal Portugal
Portuguese	Lisboa	Lisabon
Romania Rumunjska
Românian	Caransebeș	Sebeš
Românian	Carașova	Karaševo
Românian	Cluj-Napoca	Kluž
Românian	Jimbolia	Žombolj
Românian	Lipova	Lipa
Românian	Lugoj	Lugoš
Românian	Oradea	Veliki Varadin
Românian	Orșova	Oršava
Românian	Sibiu	Sibinj
Românian	Svinița	Svinjica
Românian	Timișoara	Temišvar
Russia Rusija
Russian	Nizhny Novgorod	Nižnji Novgorod
Russian	Nizhny Tagil	Nižnji Tagil
Russian	Sankt Peterburg	Petrograd (historical)
Russian	Yaroslavl	Jaroslavlj
Saudi Arabia Saudijska Arabija
Arabic	Makkah	Meka
Arabic	Madīnah	Medina
Serbia Srbija
Serbian	Beograd	Biograd (historical)
Serbian	Sremska Kamenica	Srijemska Kamenica
Serbian	Sremska Mitrovica	Srijemska Mitrovica
Serbian	Sremski Karlovci	Srijemski Karlovci
Slovakia Slovačka
Slovak	Bratislava	Požun (historical)
Slovak	Devínska Nová Ves	Devinsko Novo Selo
Slovak	Chorvátsky Grob	Hrvatski Grob
Slovak	Jarovce	Hrvatski Jandrof
Slovak	Rusovce	Rosvar
Slovenia Slovenija
Slovene	Koper	Kopar
Somalia Somalija
Somali - Arabic	Muqdisho - Maqadīshū	Mogadišu
Switzerland Švicarska
German - French	Genf - Genève	Ženeva
Syria Sirija
Arabic	Dimashq	Damask
Turkey Turska
Turkish	Antakya	Antiohija
Turkish	Edirne	Drinopolje
Turkish	Galipoli	Galipolje
Turkish	İstanbul	Carigrad (historical)
Ukraine Ukrajina
Ukrainian	Chernivtsi	Černovice
Ukrainian	Chornobil'	Černobil
Ukrainian	Dnipro	Dnjipro
Ukrainian	Donets'k	Donjeck
Ukrainian	Kyiv	Kijev
Ukrainian	Lviv	Lavov
United Kingdom Ujedinjeno Kraljevstvo
English	Edinburgh	Jedingrad (historical)
English	London	Lodin (historical)
United States of America Ujedinjene Američke Države
English	New York	Navijork (historical)
Uzbekistan Uzbekistan
Uzbek	Toshkent	Taškent
Language	Native name	Croatian exonym

== See also ==
- List of European exonyms
