= Marócsa =

- Village
- Location in Hungary
- Coordinates: 45°54′54″N 17°48′52″E
- Country: Hungary
- County: Baranya County
- District: Sellye

Government
  - Mayor: Jenőné Berta (Fidesz–KDNP)
  - Term in office: since 2018

Area
  - Total: 11.38 km^{2} (4.39 sq mi)

Population (2022)
  - Total: 161
  - Density: 14.1/km^{2} (36.6/sq mi)
- Postal code: 7960
- Area code: 72

Marócsa is a village in Baranya county, Hungary.

== Names ==
In Croatian, the village has two names: Marača, used by residents of Drávakeresztúr, and Maroč, used in Felsőszentmárton.

The origin of the name Marócsa is uncertain, but it may derive from a word in one of the South Slavic languages with a similar form.

== Gallery ==
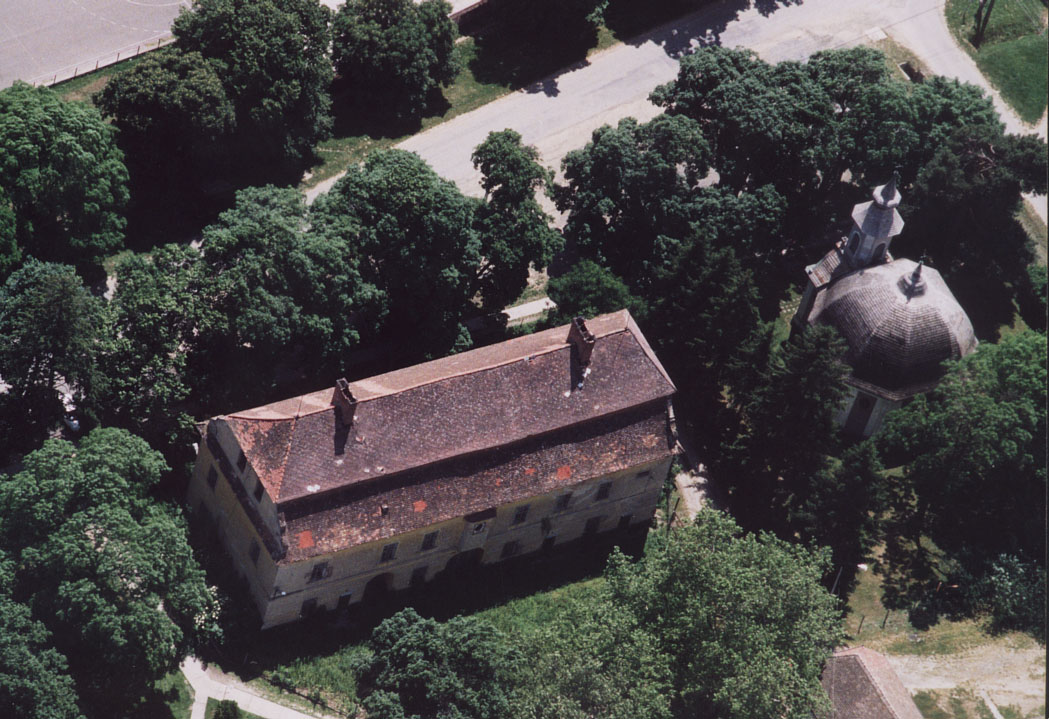
Aerial photo: Mecseknádasd - Palace

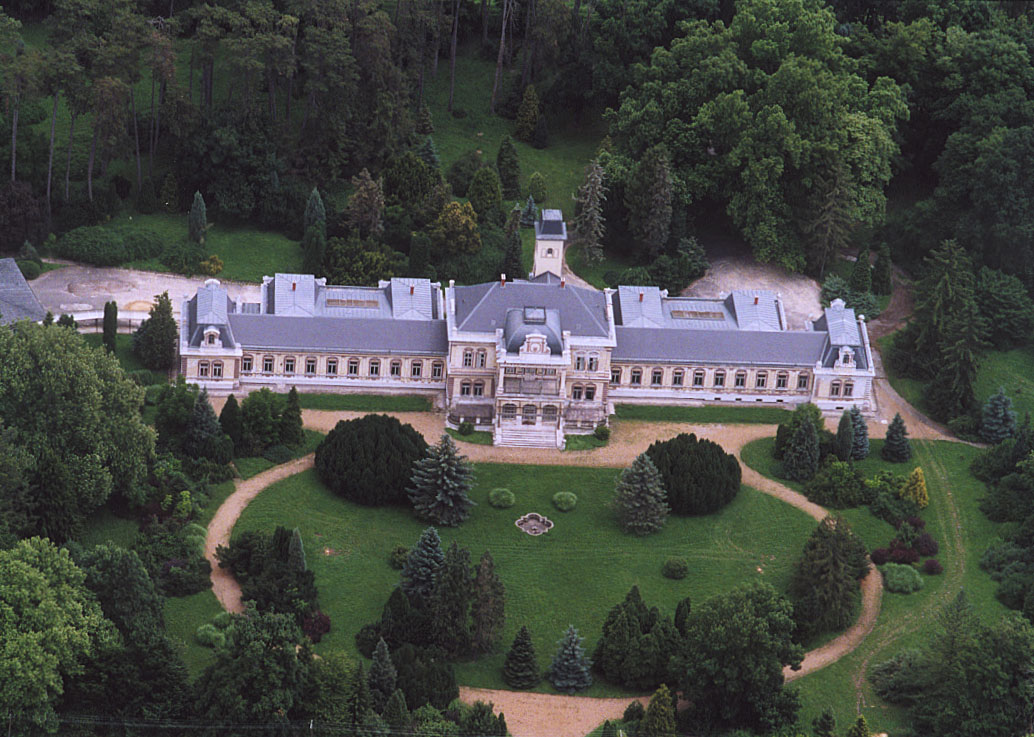
Szentegát - Biedermann-Palace from above

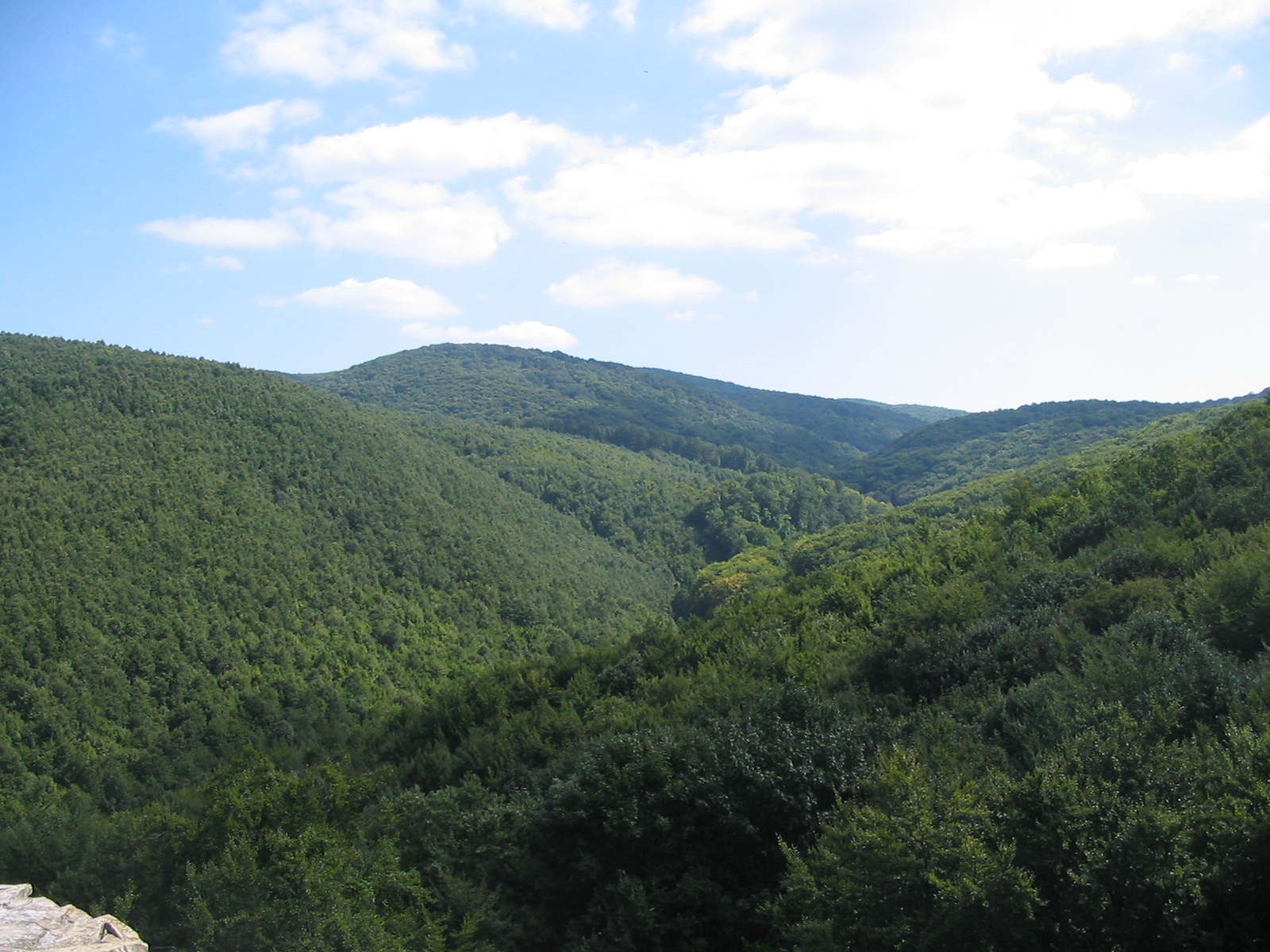
Mecsek Mountains, in the northern area of the county

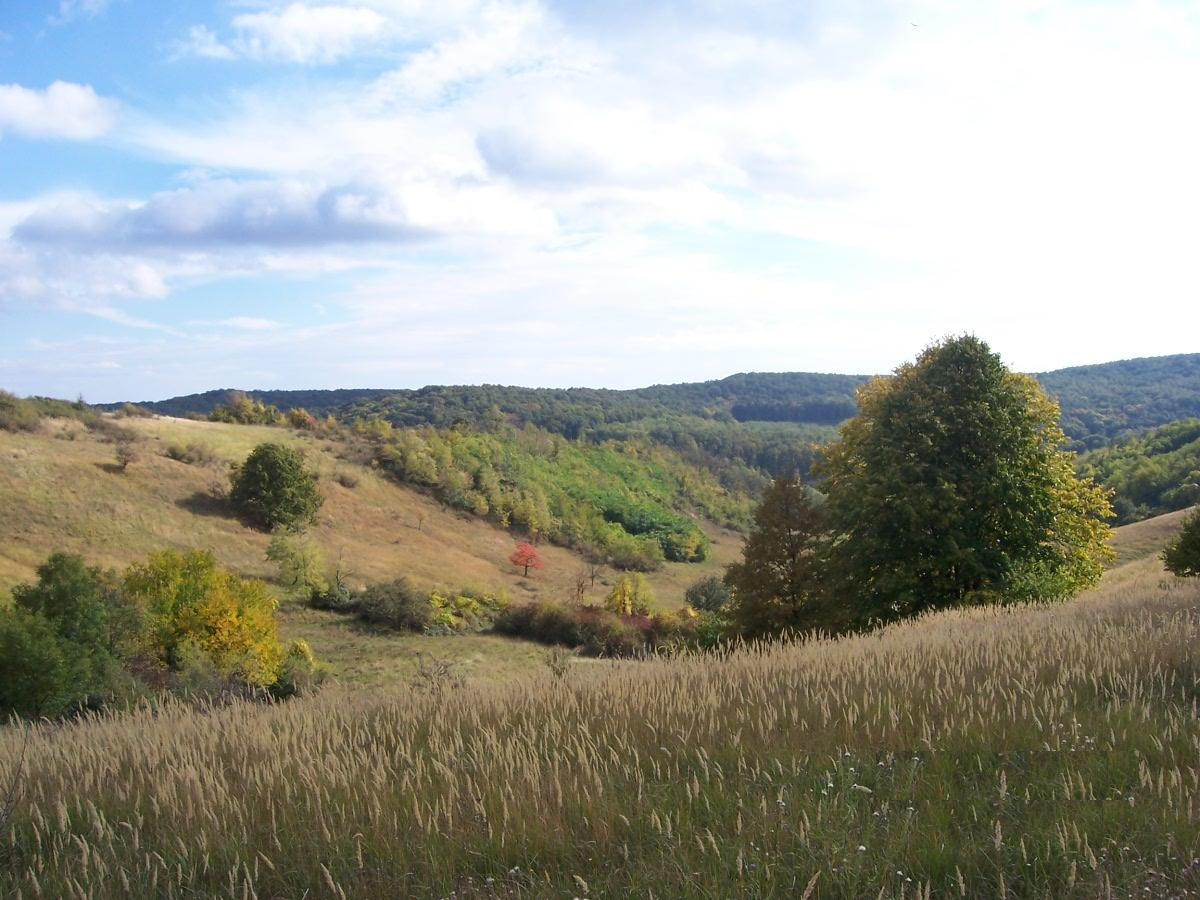
Hills in the northeast
