= Boldogasszonyfa =

Boldogasszonyfa Boldigaß (German)
- Village
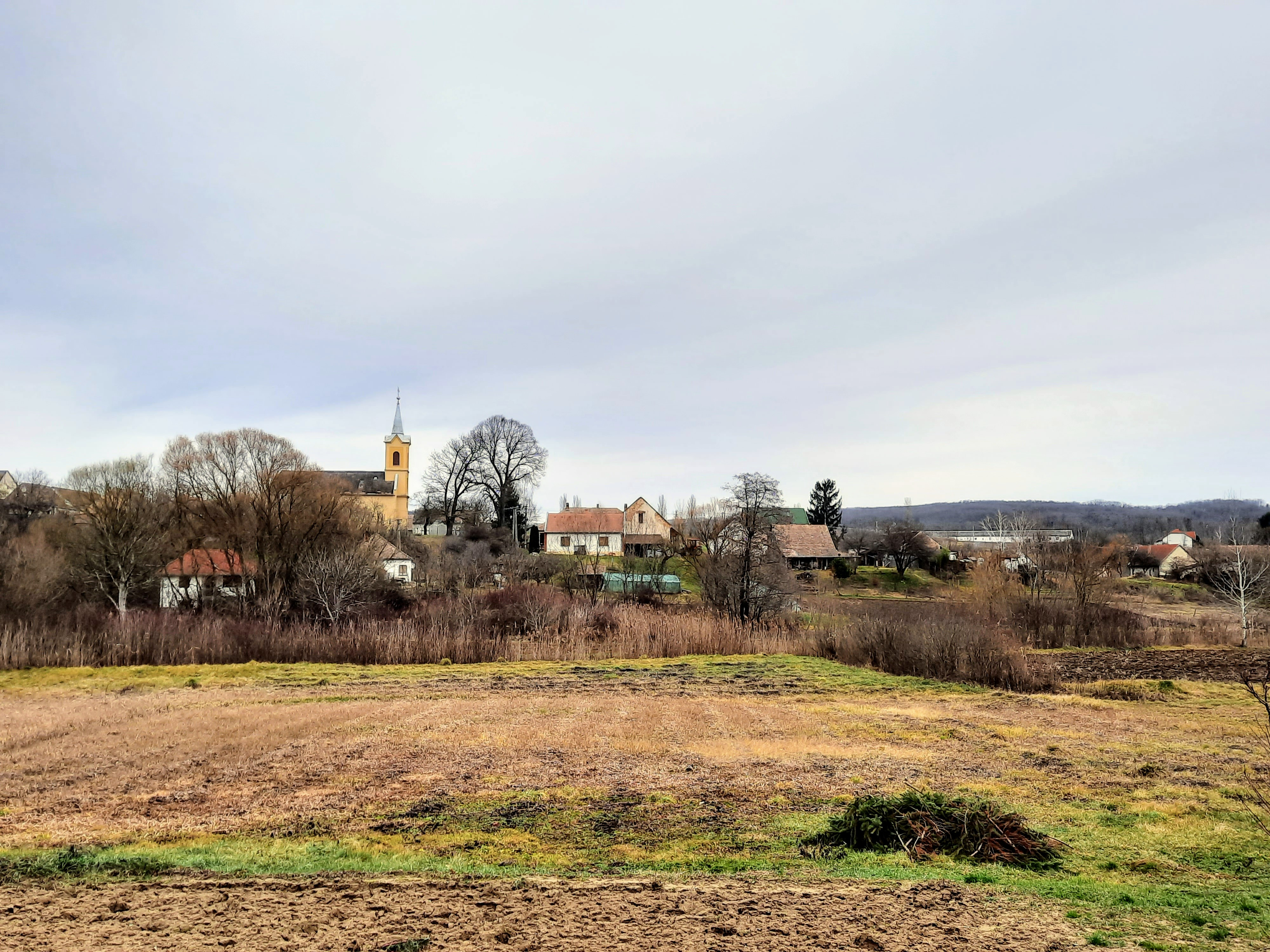

- Flag Coat of arms
- Interactive map of Boldogasszonyfa
- Coordinates: 46°11′N 17°50′E
- Country: Hungary
- County: Baranya

Government
  - Mayor: Tófei József (Ind.)

Area
  - Total: 6.65 sq mi (17.22 km^{2})

Population (2022)
  - Total: 376
  - Density: 56.6/sq mi (21.8/km^{2})
- Time zone: UTC+1 (CET)
  - Summer (DST): UTC+2 (CEST)
- Postal code: 7937
- Area code: 73
- Website: http://www.boldogasszonyfa.hu

Boldogasszonyfa is a village in Baranya county, Hungary.

== Location ==
It is on the border of Baranya and Somogy counties, next to Szentlászló. The nearest city is Szigetvár, which is 10 km from the village.

== History ==
Boldogasszonyfa has been inhabited since the Stone Age. Its name is first mentioned in 1344 in a diploma. In 1746 came Slavs and Germans. The village was owned by the Igmándy family.

In 1950 the government of Hungary annexed the village from Somogy to Baranya. In 2001 the population's consistency was 2,7% German and 6% Gypsy; the others were Hungarians and others.

== Monuments ==
- Chateau Igmándy
- Roman Catholic Church (built up between 1830 and 1872 (classic style))
- Memorial park of the deployed Germans
- Memorial park of the world war victims
- World War victims' memory cross
