= Mozsgó =

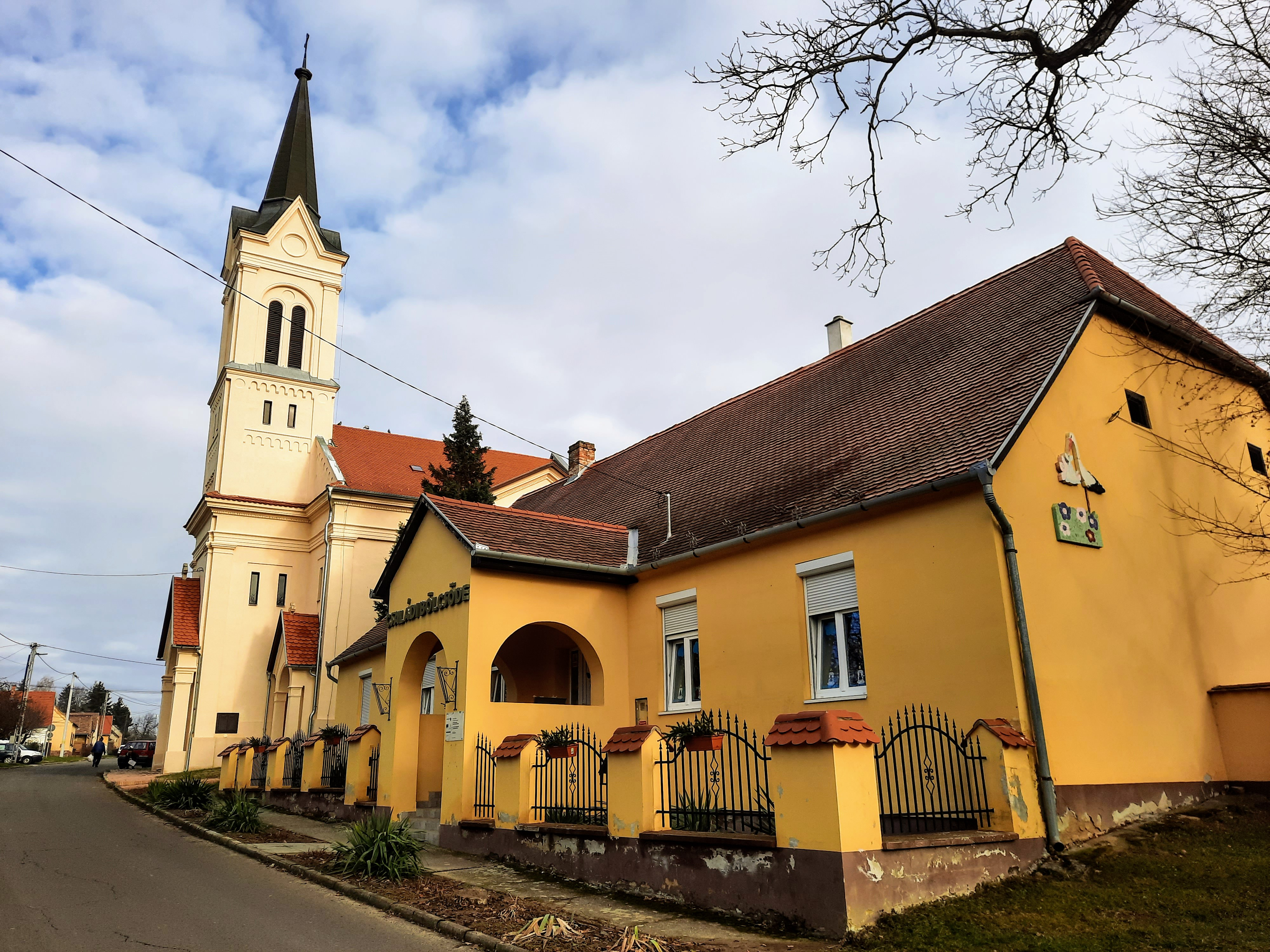

- Location of Baranya county in Hungary

- Location of Mozsgó
- Coordinates: 46.11251°N 17.84456°E
- Country: Hungary
- County: Baranya

Area
  - Total: 21.76 km^{2} (8.40 sq mi)

Population (2008)
  - Total: 1,067
  - Density: 49/km^{2} (130/sq mi)
- Time zone: UTC+1 (CET)
  - Summer (DST): UTC+2 (CEST)
- Postal code: 7932
- Area code: 73

Mozsgó (Croatian: Možgaj, Možgov) is a village in Baranya county, Hungary, northeast of Szigetvár.

Mozsgó is home to Biedermann Castle, which was constructed circa 1896. The manor passed through many owners to settle their debts and even withstood a fire in 1917, before it was partially restored. Following private ownership, it operated as a municipal cultural institution, then dormitory, and from 1950 onwards, it operated as a tractor driver training. It has been operating as a social home since 1960.
