= Vejti =

- Village (Falva)
- Location of Baranya county in Hungary

- Location of Vejti
- Coordinates: 45.81042°N 17.96956°E
- Country: Hungary
- County: Baranya

Area
  - Total: 9.76 km^{2} (3.77 sq mi)

Population (2004)
  - Total: 199
  - Density: 20.38/km^{2} (52.8/sq mi)
- Time zone: UTC+2 (EET)
  - Summer (DST): UTC+3 (EEST)
- Postal code: 7838
- Area code: 73

Vejti (Croatian: Vejtiba, Vertiba) is a village in Baranya county, Hungary.

== History ==
The area has been inhabited since ancient times. Old coins, fragments of pottery and the foundations of old buildings have been found on the site of today's Vertiba.

Documents mention it as early as 1341 under the name Veyteh. During the Turkish rule, it did not relax, unlike many neighboring villages. At that time, the inhabitants were mostly Hungarians. At the beginning of the 20th century, Vejtiba belonged to the Šiklóš district.

According to the 1940 census, the village had 439 inhabitants, of which, according to the methodology used to conduct the census, 438 were Hungarians, 136 were Roman Catholics, and 301 were Protestants. This village also belongs to the Danube-Drava National Park. The border is a 12-hectare forest of old pedunculate oaks, maples, etc.
