= Kétújfalu =

- Village
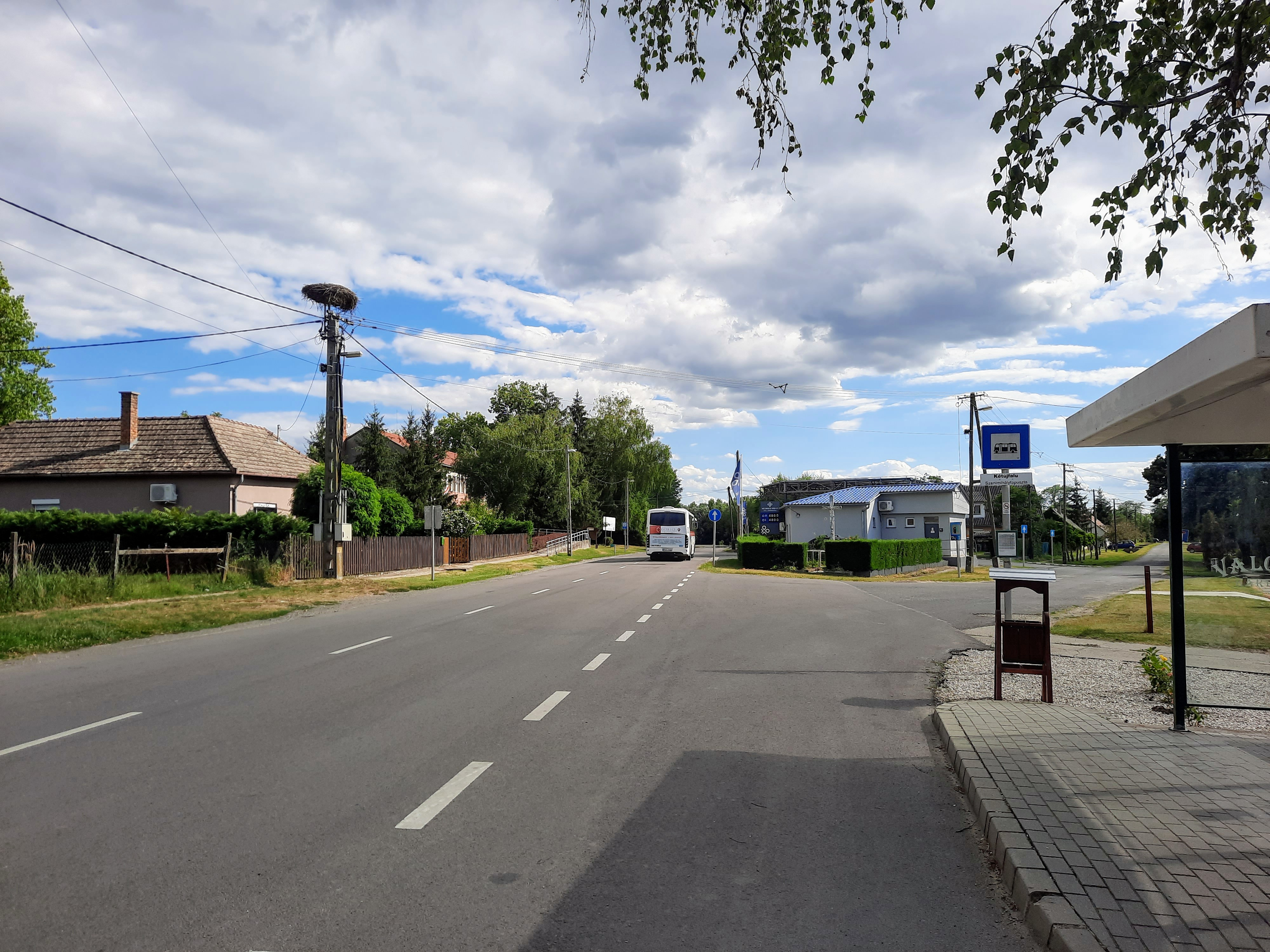
- Kétújfalu is a village in Baranya county, Hungary.
- Interactive map of Kétújfalu
- Coordinates: 45°58′N 17°42′E
- Country: Hungary
- County: Baranya

Population (2025)
  - Total: 635
- Time zone: UTC+1 (CET)
  - Summer (DST): UTC+2 (CEST)

Kétújfalu is a village in Baranya county, Hungary.
