= Somogyhatvan =

- Village (Falva)
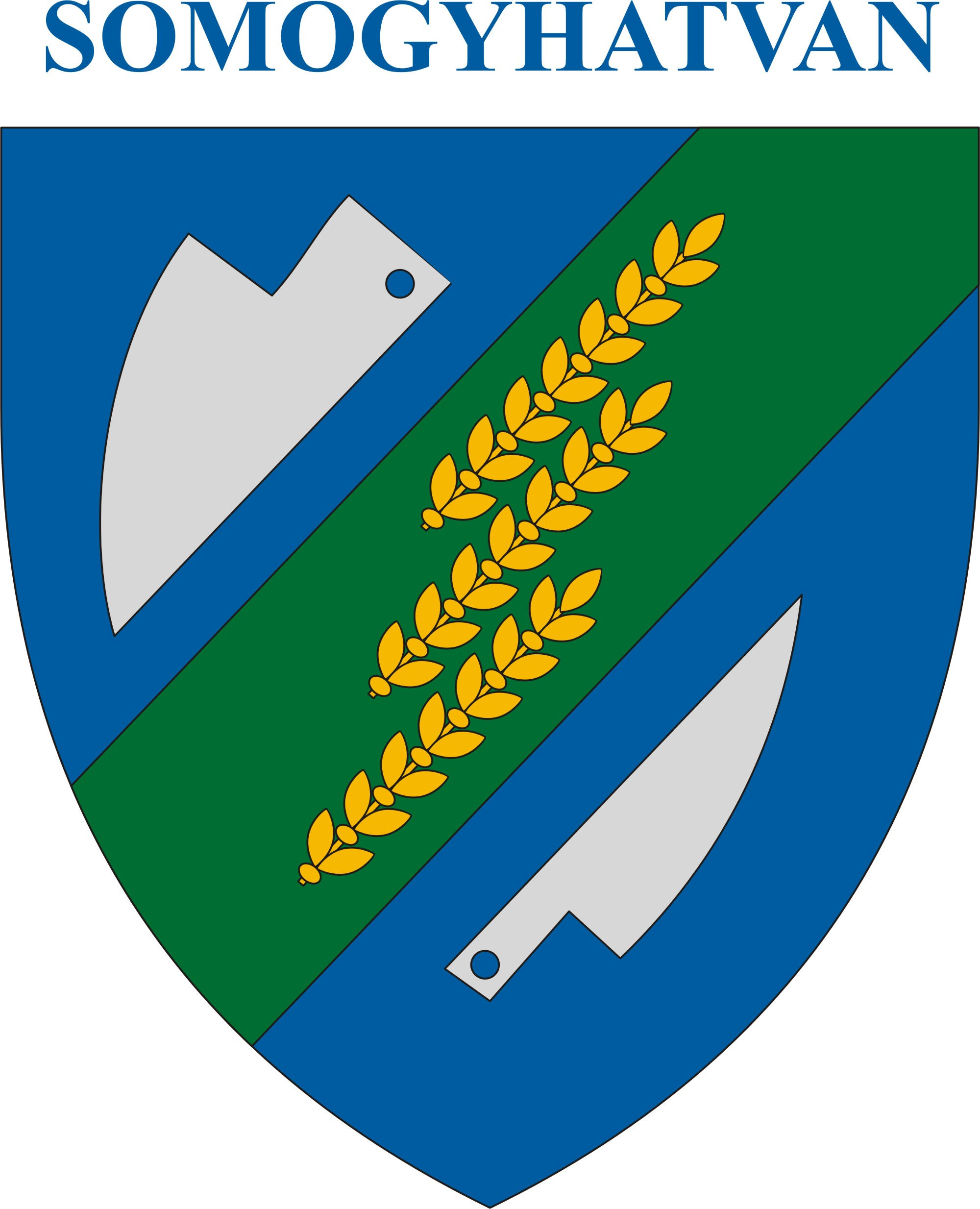
- Seal

- Location of Baranya county in Hungary

- Location of Somogyhatvan
- Coordinates: 46.11195°N 17.71413°E
- Country: Hungary
- County: Baranya

Area
  - Total: 13.52 km^{2} (5.22 sq mi)

Population (2004)
  - Total: 374
  - Density: 27.66/km^{2} (71.6/sq mi)
- Time zone: UTC+1 (CET)
  - Summer (DST): UTC+2 (CEST)
- Postal code: 7921
- Area code: 73

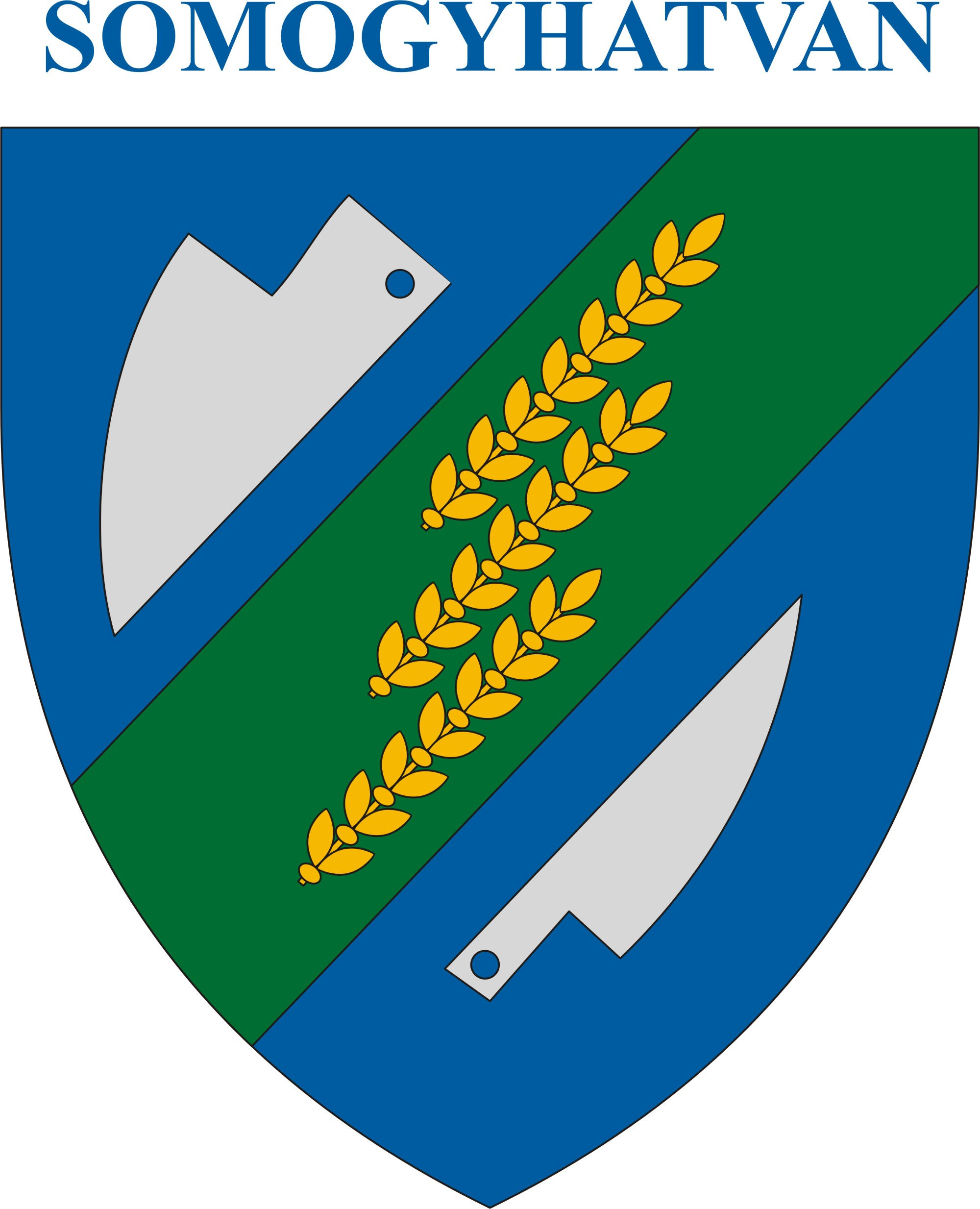

Somogyhatvan is a village in Baranya county, Hungary.
