= Szentlászló =

Szentlászló Senglasl (German)
- Village (Falva)
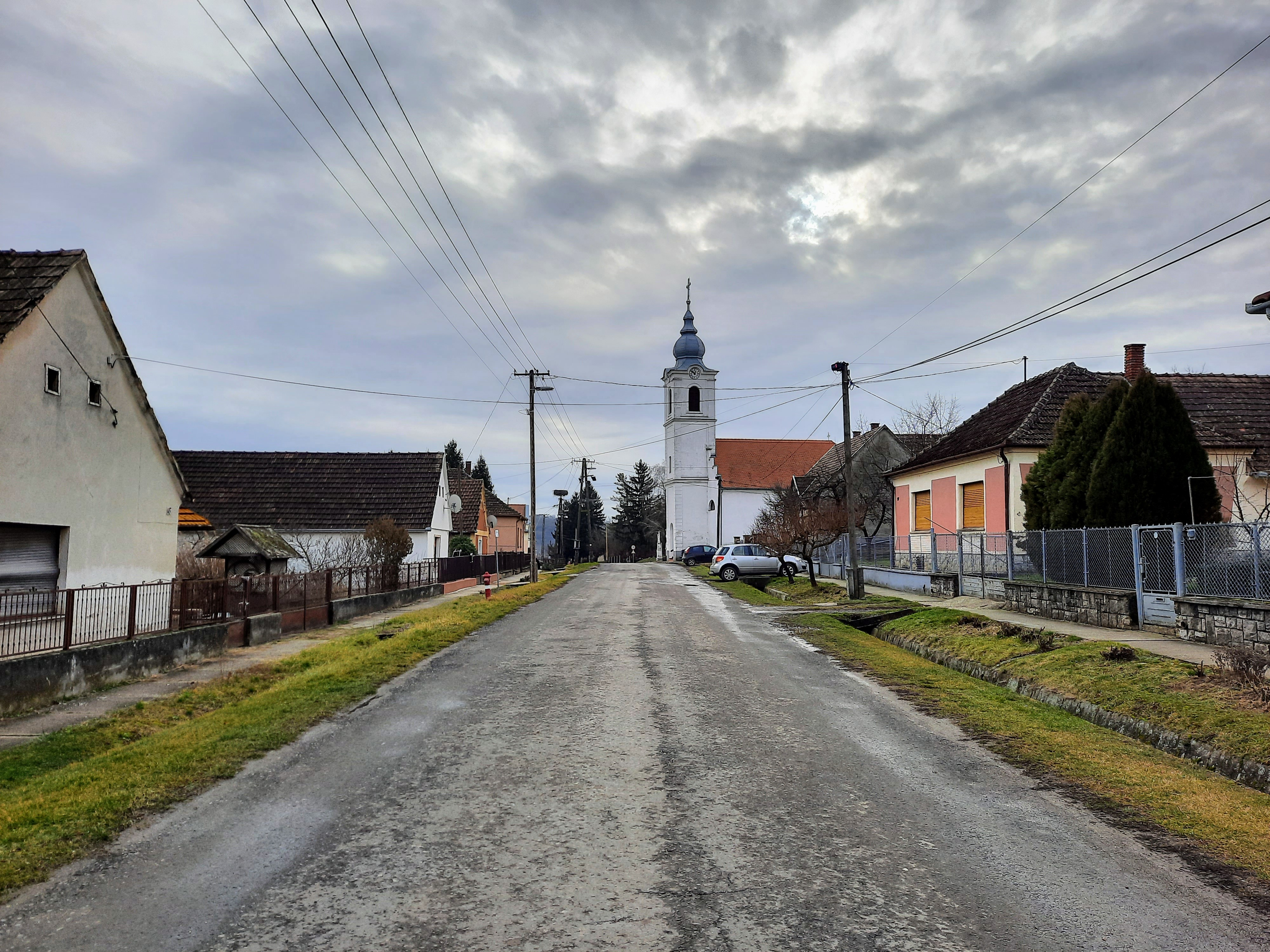

- Seal
- Interactive map of Szentlászló
- Coordinates: 46°09′24″N 17°50′08″E
- Country: Hungary
- County: Baranya
- Originally named Disznóóvó: 1237

Government
  - Mayor: István Hideg
  - Notary: Krisztián Kontra

Population
  - Total: 850
  - Density: 156.6/sq mi (60.46/km^{2})
- Time zone: UTC+1 (CET)
  - Summer (DST): UTC+2 (CEST)
- Postcode: 7936
- Area code: 73
- Website: Website

Szentlászló is a village in Baranya county, Hungary.

== Location ==
The village is located on the northwestern side of Baranya (in Zselic). The next city Szigetvár lies 13 km from the village. Baranya's county seat Pécs is 47 km away. There was a MÁV railway between Szigetvár and the second proximate city Kaposvár. Since the 1970s, the only way to come to the village has been the main road numbered 67, and by bus. The through traffic is big, because the trucks going to Lake Balaton drive through.

== History ==
Before the 1950s, Szentlászló was placed in Somogy. The first written sources derive from 1287–1240. The patron saint is Saint Ladislaus I. Here there was a rectory named Margitapuszta. Szentlászló's rectory was given by Ladislaus I. In the Turkish occupation there was no constant population. In the 18th century Germans came to the village. After World War II they deployed to East Germany, and instead of them, came people from Slovakia. The first church was built in 1738. The present church sacred in 1821. The Germans had their own ethnic council, which opened in 2002. The primary school is an ethnic school.

== Interesting places ==
=== Village museum ===
The museum is next to the Route 67. In this museum there are some old Kraut clothes, furniture, and other items.

=== Corn museum ===
The only corn museum in the country. The museum is like that in Romania. There are puppets, and furniture from the corn's "hair".

=== King St. Ladiuslaus Primary School ===
The village's school, with classes 1 to 8 (1–4, and higher 5–8). The school has programs like "German day", football matches, and

=== St. Ladislaus Roman Catholic Church ===
It can be found in a Y-corner next to the school and kindergarten. This church was built in 1821, and was renovated in 2001 because the tower started to fall out in the road.
