= Horváthertelend =

- Village
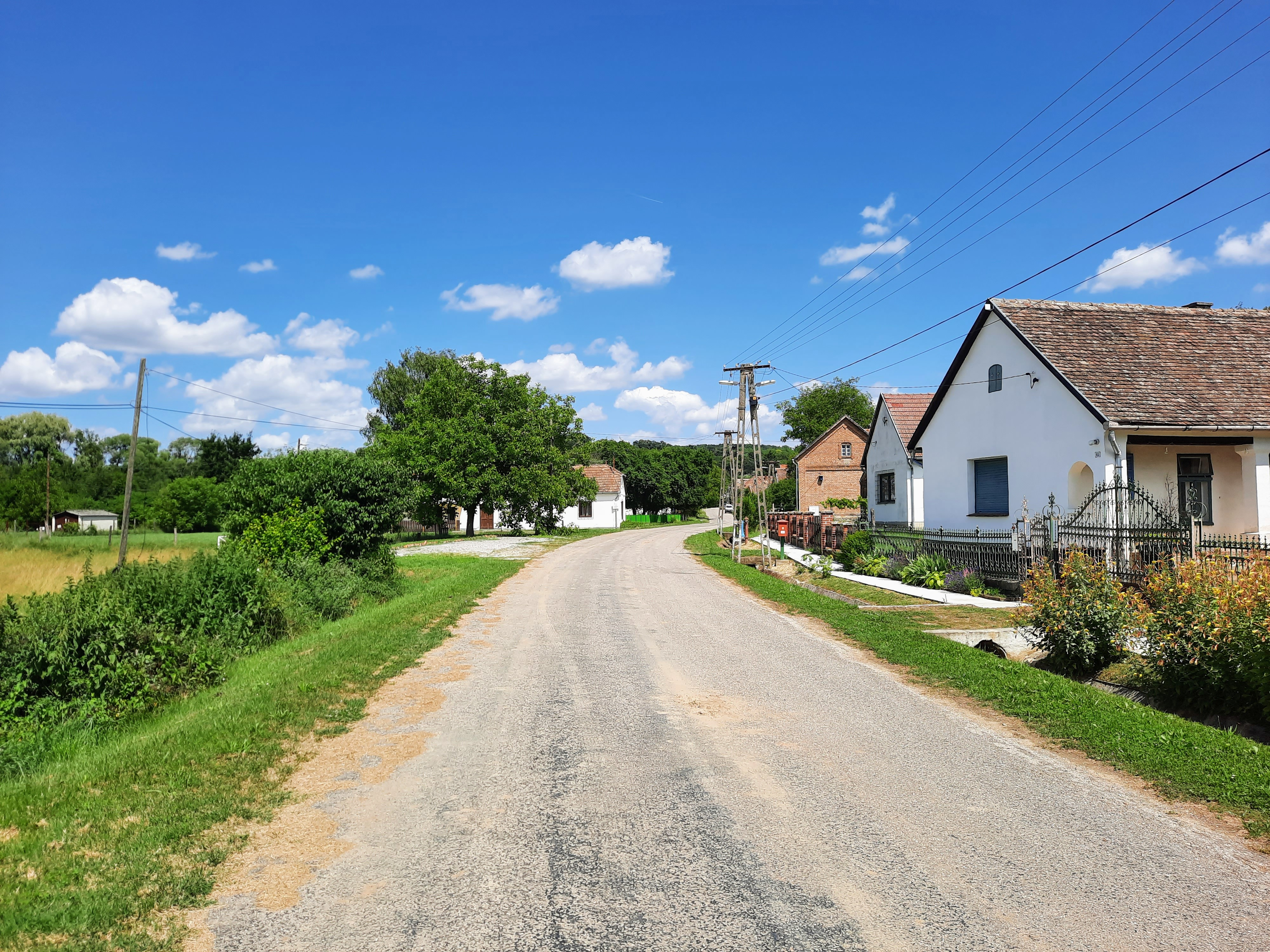
- Interactive map of Horváthertelend
- Coordinates: 46°10′N 17°55′E
- Country: Hungary
- County: Baranya
- Time zone: UTC+1 (CET)
  - Summer (DST): UTC+2 (CEST)

Horváthertelend is a village in Baranya county, Hungary.
