= Hobol =

- Village
- Coat of arms

- Location of Hobol
- Coordinates: 46.02023°N 17.77169°E
- Country: Hungary
- County: Baranya

Area
  - Total: 18.27 km^{2} (7.05 sq mi)

Population (2004)
  - Total: 1,032
  - Density: 56.48/km^{2} (146.3/sq mi)
- Time zone: UTC+1 (CET)
  - Summer (DST): UTC+2 (CEST)
- Postal code: 7971
- Area code: 73

Hobol (Croatian: Obolj, Obol, Oboj, Vobol) is a village in Baranya county, Hungary.

== Demographics ==
As of 2022, the town was 94.4% Hungarian, 6.6% Gypsy, 1% German, 0.5% Croatian, and 1.6% of non-European origin. The population was 31.3% Roman Catholic, and 8% Reformed.
