= Rózsafa =

- Village (Falva)
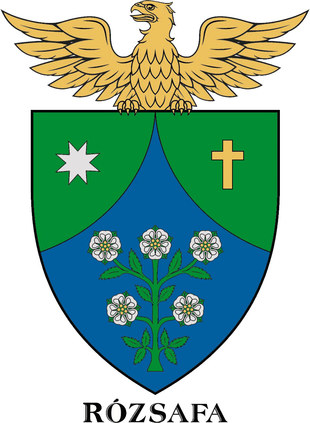
- Seal
- Interactive map of Rózsafa
- Coordinates: 46°01′N 17°53′E
- Country: Hungary
- County: Baranya

Population (2025)
  - Total: 307
- Time zone: UTC+1 (CET)
  - Summer (DST): UTC+2 (CEST)

Rózsafa is a village in Baranya county, Hungary, a small region of Castle Island.
