= Ibafa =

- Location of Ibafa
- Coordinates: 46.15489°N 17.91649°E
- Country: Hungary
- County: Baranya

Area
  - Total: 29.30 km^{2} (11.31 sq mi)

Population (2001)
  - Total: 250
  - Density: 8.53/km^{2} (22.1/sq mi)
- Time zone: UTC+1 (CET)
  - Summer (DST): UTC+2 (CEST)
- Postal code: 7935
- Area code: 73

Ibafa (Croatian: Ibaba) is a small village with a population of 250 in Baranya county, Hungary. The village is in the valleys of Zselic. The mayor is László Benes.

Ibafa became known in the 20th century, because the local priest liked pipes. He was a strange ecclesiastical person, always seen with a pipe in his mouth, playing cards with pals in the pub. A journalist stumbled on him, and wrote a tongue-twister verse beginning with the line:

"Az ibafai papnak fapipája van, ezért az ibafai papi pipa papi fapipa"

meaning

"The priest of Ibafa has a wooden pipe, so the priestly pipe of Ibafa is a priestly wooden pipe".

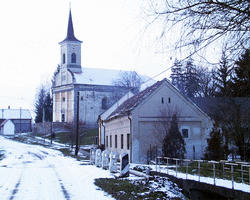
Ibafa in winter

== Sights ==
There is a Pipe Museum in the village, where you can find the pipe of Ferenc Deák and Mihály Károlyi.

Gyűrűfű is a bio-village located close to Ibafa.
