= Vásárosbéc =

Vásárosbéc Wetz (in German)
- Village (Falva)
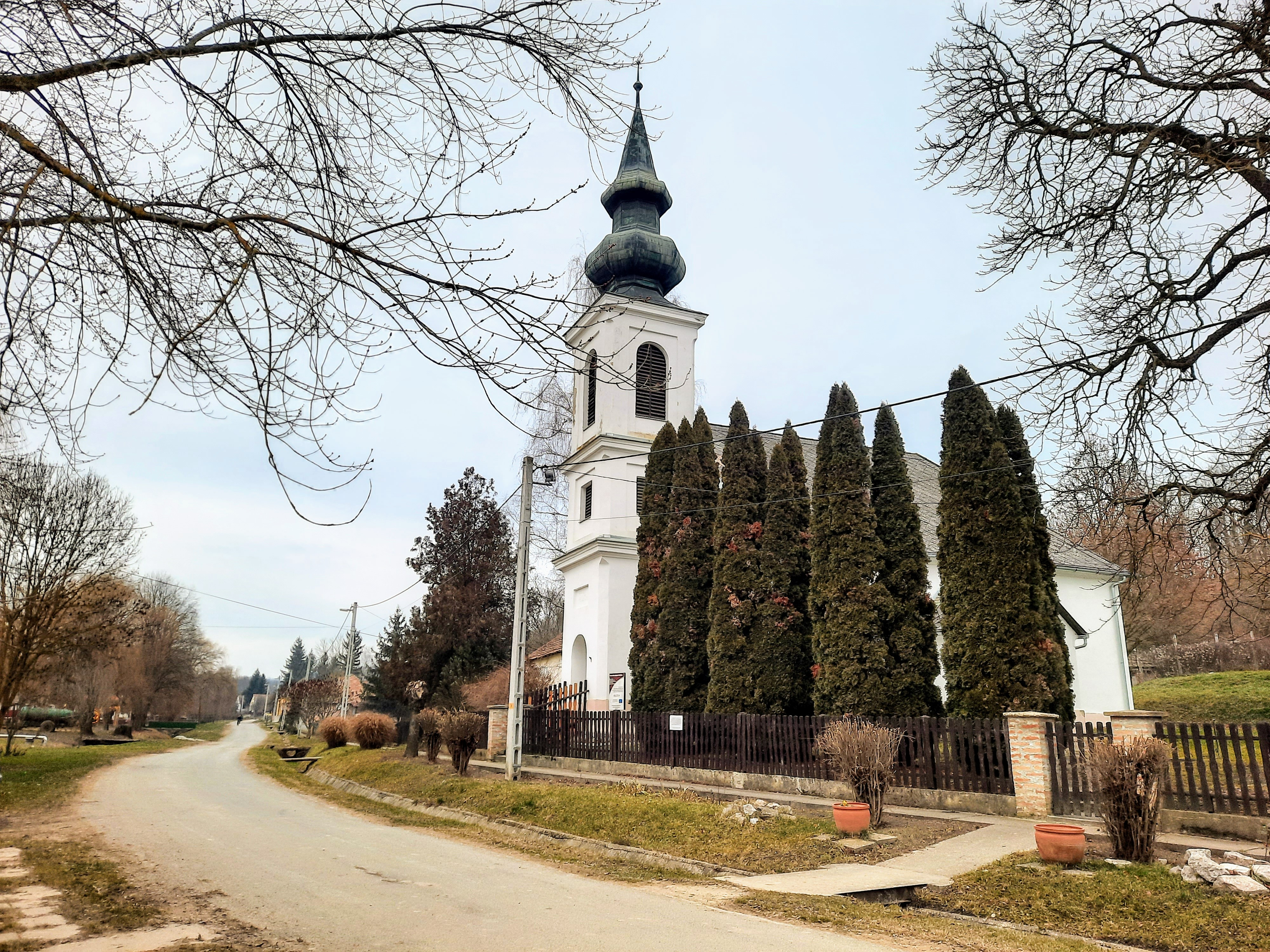
- Church in Vásárosbéc.

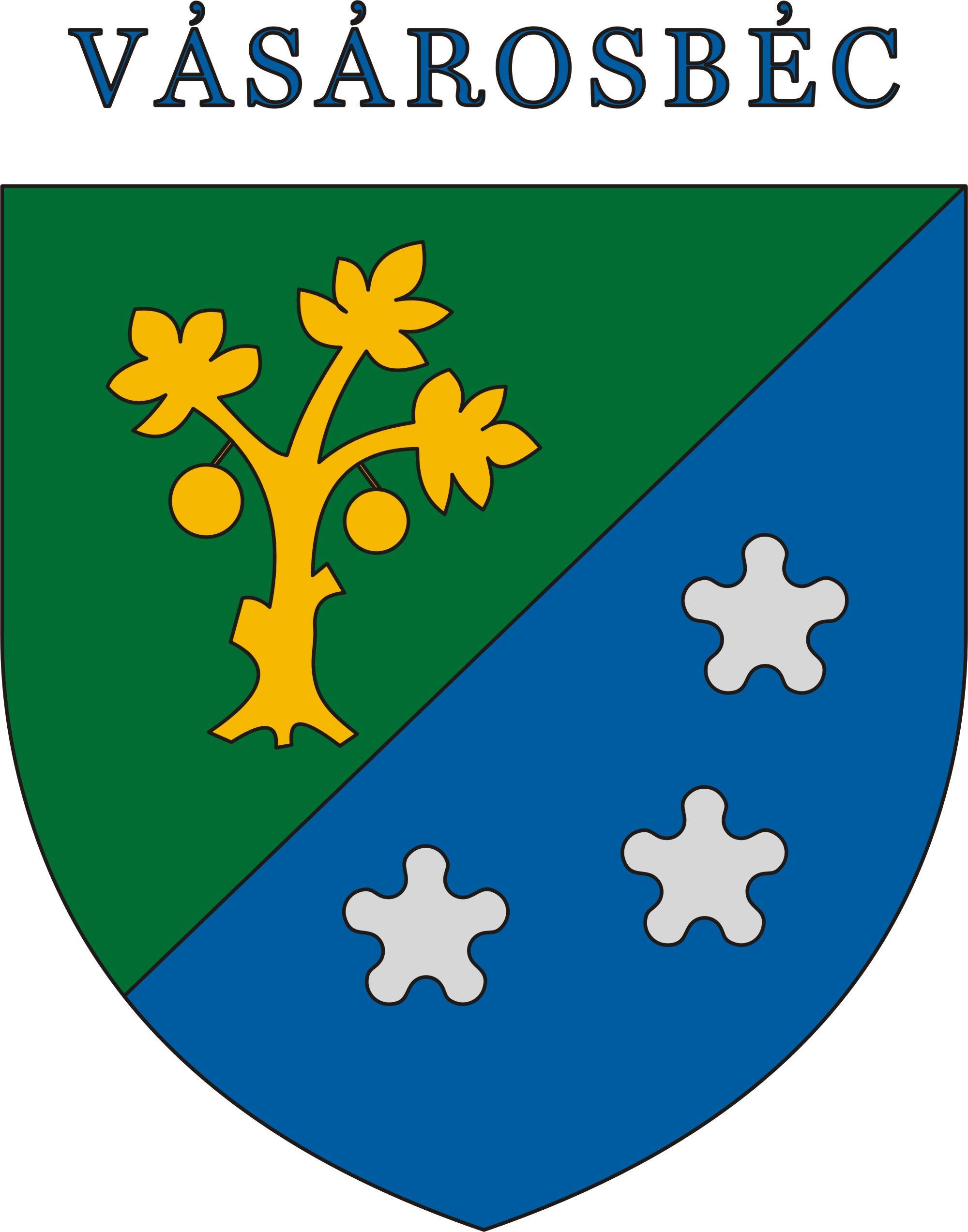
- Coat of arms

- Location within Hungary
- Coordinates: 46°11′N 17°44′E
- Country: Hungary
- County: Baranya

Government
  - Mayor: Bankó István (Ind.)

Area
  - Total: 9.51 sq mi (24.64 km^{2})

Population (2015)
  - Total: 181
  - Density: 18.9/sq mi (7.31/km^{2})
- Time zone: UTC+1 (CET)
  - Summer (DST): UTC+2 (CEST)
- Postal code: 7926
- Area code: 73

Vásárosbéc (Croatian: Wetz) is a village in Baranya county, Hungary. The village has a population of 174 people.Vásárosbéc Population Density 7.2 /km^{2} (18.8 /sq mi)
