= Molvány =

- Village
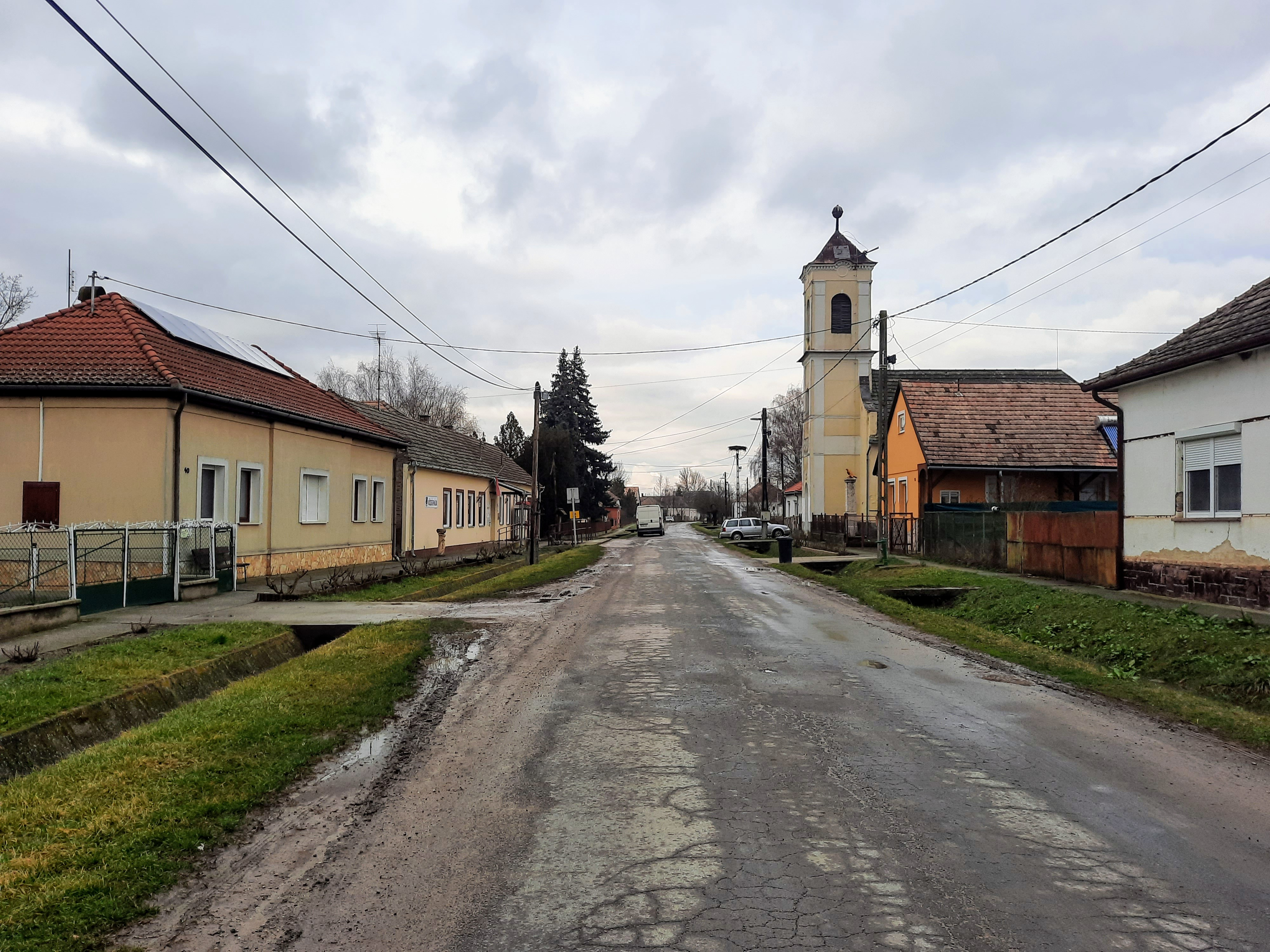

- Coat of arms
- Interactive map of Molvány
- Coordinates: 46°02′N 17°45′E
- Country: Hungary
- County: Baranya

Population (2025)
  - Total: 152
- Time zone: UTC+1 (CET)
  - Summer (DST): UTC+2 (CEST)

Molvány is a village in Baranya county, Hungary.
