= Csebény =

Csebény Tschewing
- Village
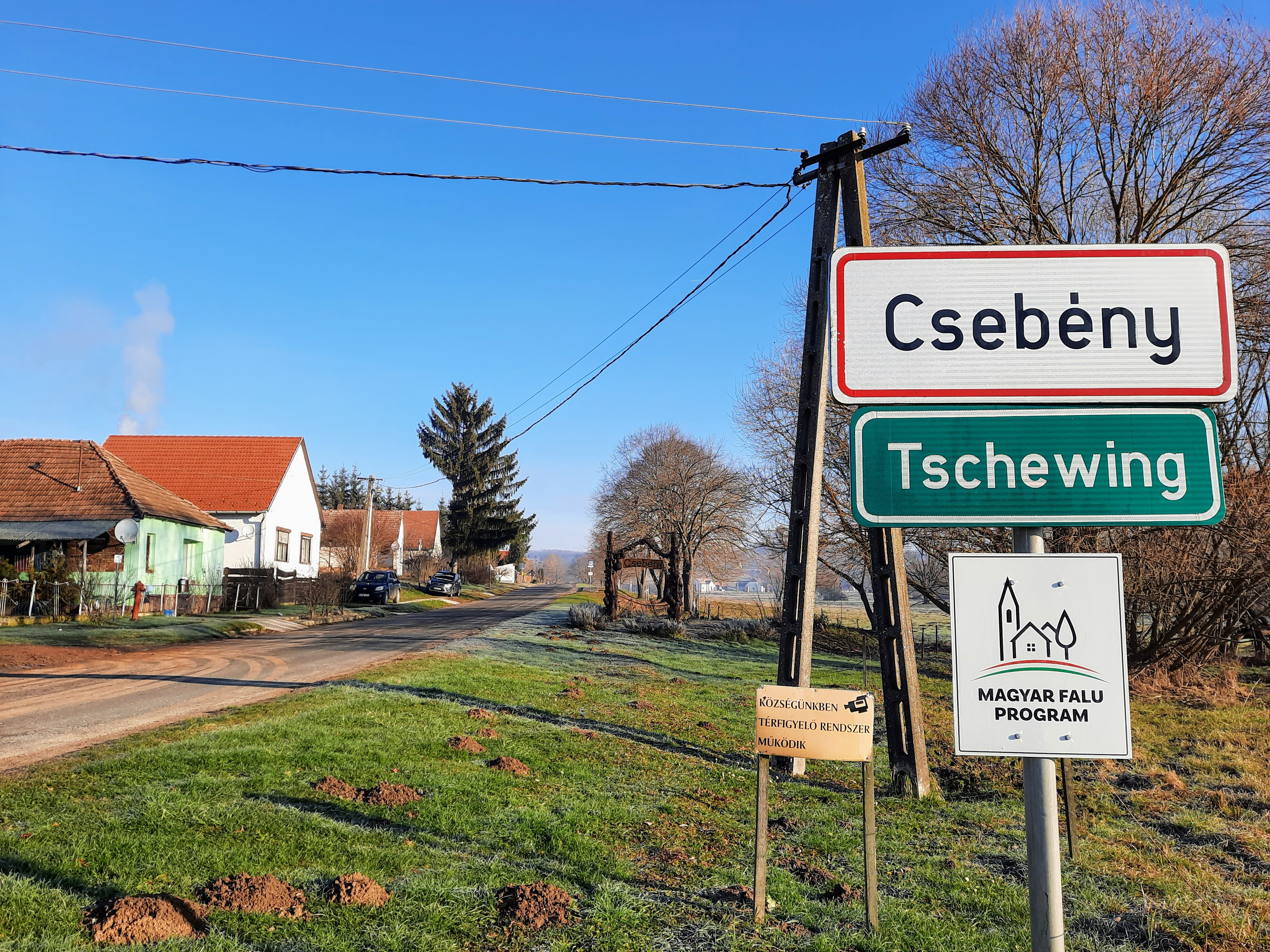

- Coat of arms
- Interactive map of Csebény
- Coordinates: 46°11′N 17°56′E
- Country: Hungary
- County: Baranya

Population (2025)
  - Total: 69
- Time zone: UTC+1 (CET)
  - Summer (DST): UTC+2 (CEST)

Csebény (German: Tschewing) is a village in Baranya county, Hungary.

== History ==
The village was first mentioned in historical records in 1211.

During the Turkish occupation, the village was depopulated.

After World War II, the Germans who made up the majority of the village’s population were expelled.
