= Magyarlukafa =

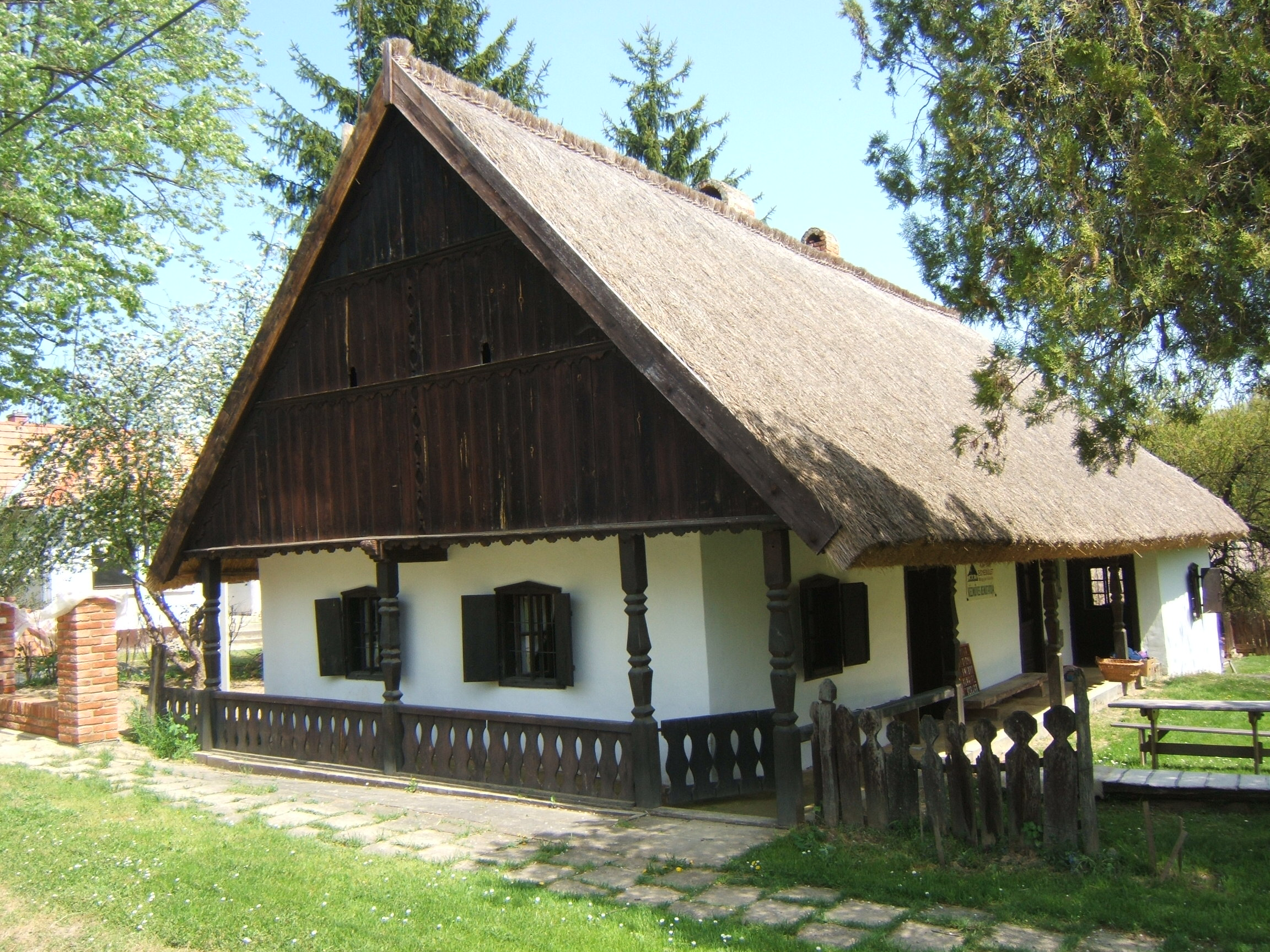
- Historic house

- Location of Baranya county in Hungary

- Location of Magyarlukafa
- Coordinates: 46.16980°N 17.75655°E
- Country: Hungary
- County: Baranya

Area
  - Total: 12.97 km^{2} (5.01 sq mi)

Population (2004)
  - Total: 87
  - Density: 6.7/km^{2} (17/sq mi)
- Time zone: UTC+1 (CET)
  - Summer (DST): UTC+2 (CEST)
- Postal code: 7925
- Area code: 73
- Website: www.magyarlukafa.hu

Magyarlukafa (Croatian: Luka) is a village in Baranya county, Hungary.
