= Botykapeterd =

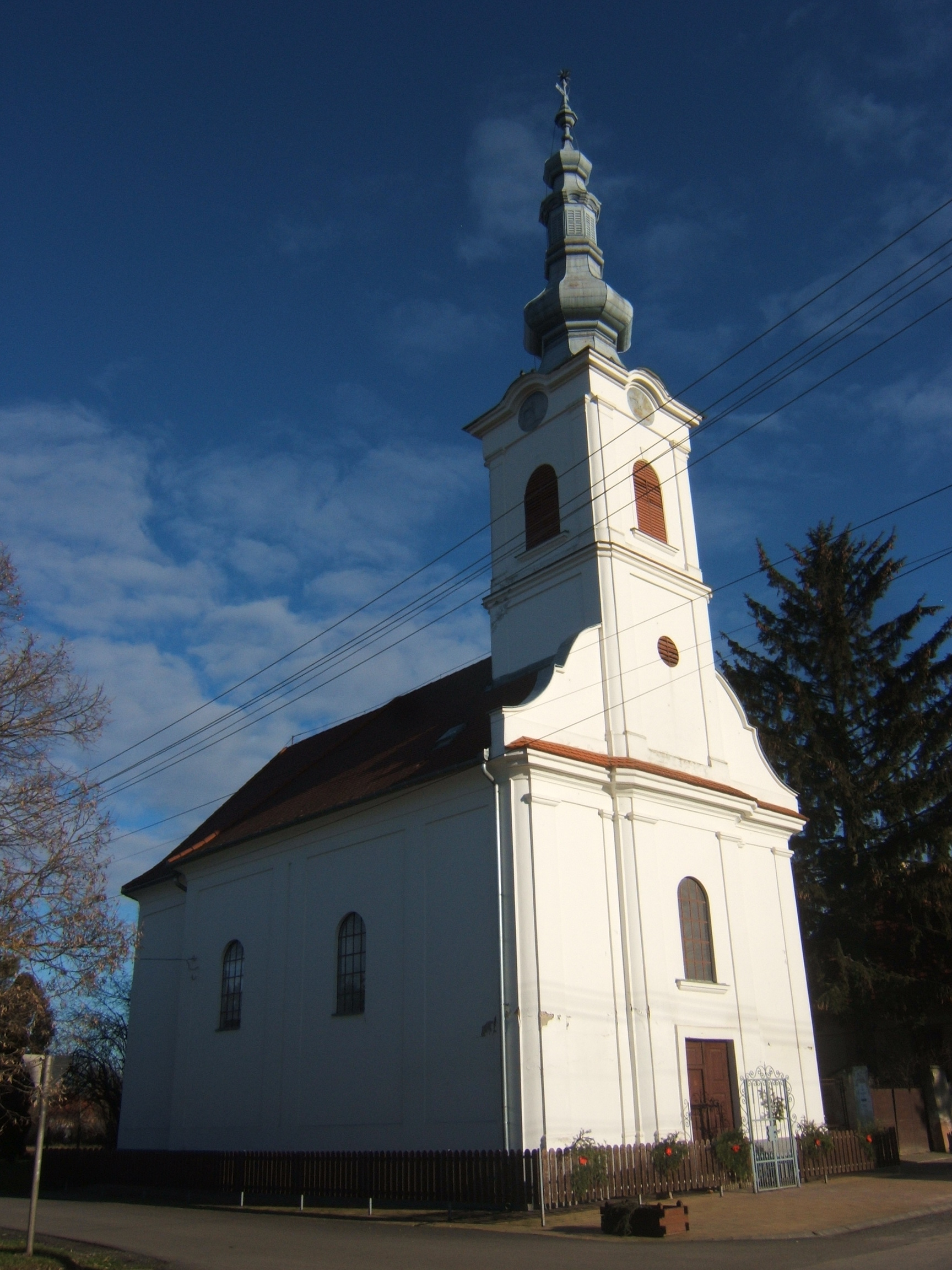
- Reformed church in Botykapeterd

- Flag Seal

- Location of Botykapeterd
- Coordinates: 46.05049°N 17.86737°E
- Country: Hungary
- County: Baranya

Area
  - Total: 17.42 km^{2} (6.73 sq mi)

Population (2004)
  - Total: 376
  - Density: 21.58/km^{2} (55.9/sq mi)
- Time zone: UTC+1 (CET)
  - Summer (DST): UTC+2 (CEST)
- Postal code: 7900
- Area code: 73

Botykapeterd (Croatian: Botka) is a village in Baranya county, Hungary.
