= Bürüs =

- Village
- Seal
- Interactive map of Bürüs
- Coordinates: 45°58′N 17°46′E
- Country: Hungary
- County: Baranya
- Time zone: UTC+1 (CET)
  - Summer (DST): UTC+2 (CEST)

Bürüs is a village in Baranya county, Hungary.

== History ==
According to László Szita the settlement was completely Hungarian in the 18th century.
