= Somogyhárságy =

- Village (Falva)
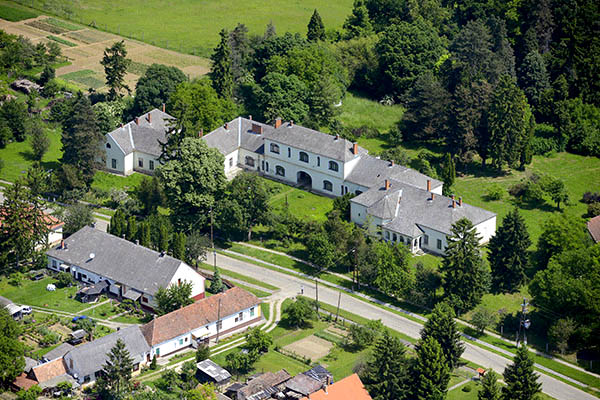

- Location of Baranya county in Hungary

- Location of Somogyhárságy
- Coordinates: 46.16231°N 17.77344°E
- Country: Hungary
- County: Baranya

Area
  - Total: 30.97 km^{2} (11.96 sq mi)

Population (2004)
  - Total: 484
  - Density: 15.62/km^{2} (40.5/sq mi)
- Time zone: UTC+1 (CET)
  - Summer (DST): UTC+2 (CEST)
- Postal code: 7925
- Area code: 73

Somogyhárságy (Croatian: Rašađ) is a village in Baranya county, Hungary.
