= Nagypeterd =

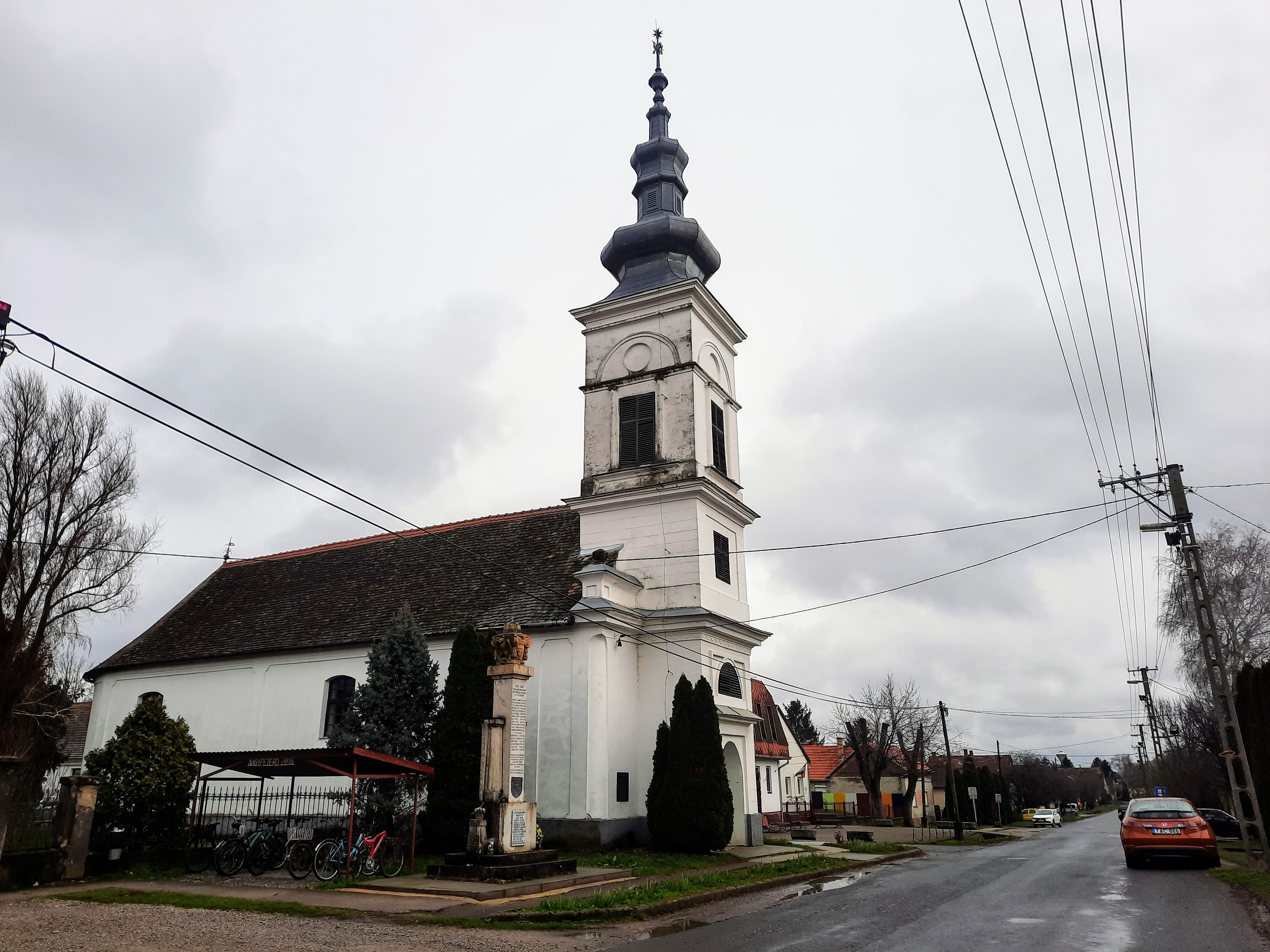

- Location of Baranya county in Hungary

- Location of Nagypeterd
- Coordinates: 46.04676°N 17.89799°E
- Country: Hungary
- County: Baranya

Area
  - Total: 11.61 km^{2} (4.48 sq mi)

Population (2004)
  - Total: 677
  - Density: 58.31/km^{2} (151.0/sq mi)
- Time zone: UTC+1 (CET)
  - Summer (DST): UTC+2 (CEST)
- Postal code: 7912
- Area code: 73

Nagypeterd (Croatian: Petreda) is a village in Baranya county, Hungary.
