= Drávakeresztúr =

- Village
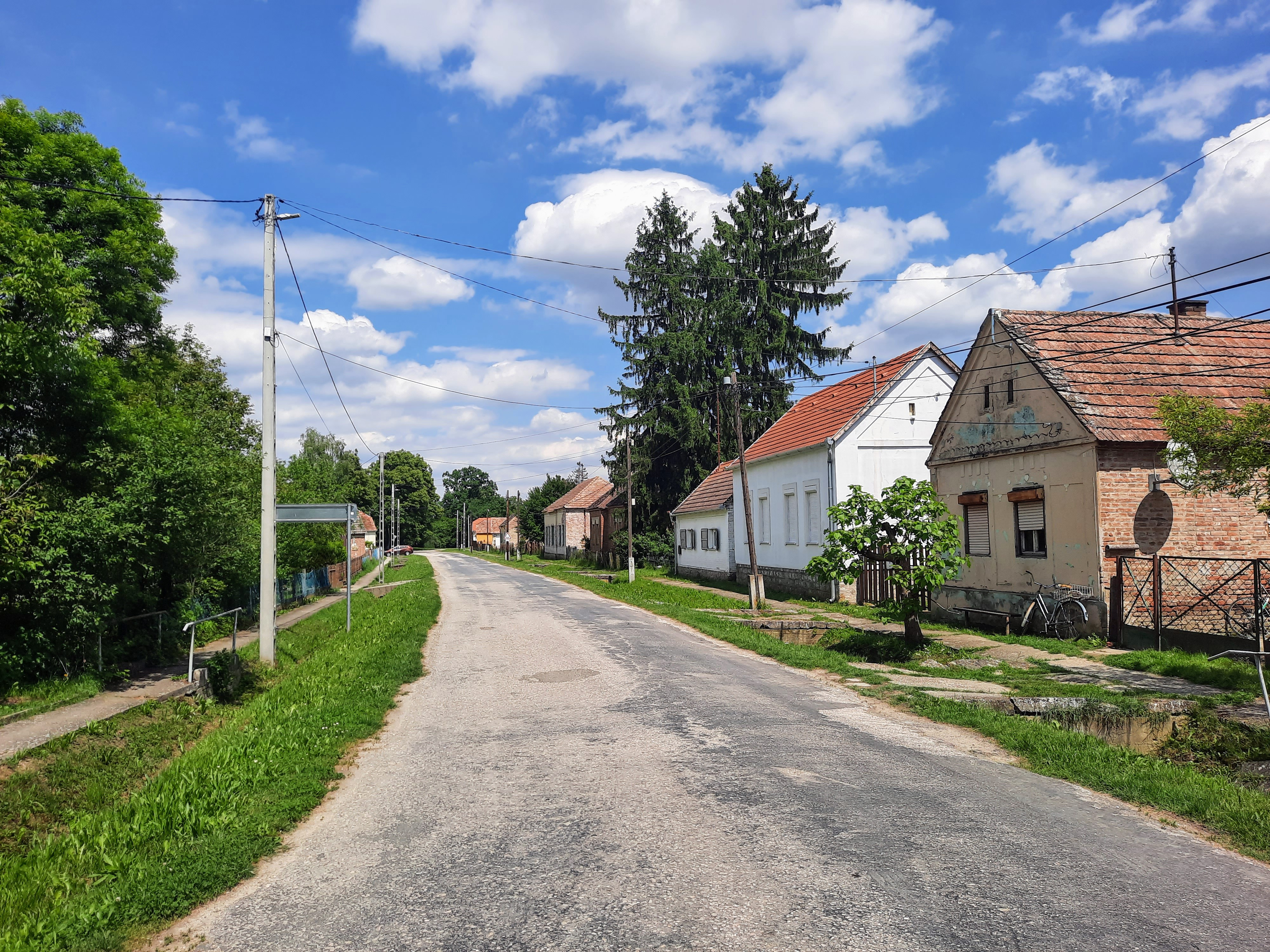
- Interactive map of Drávakeresztúr
- Coordinates: 45°50′N 17°46′E
- Country: Hungary
- County: Baranya
- Time zone: UTC+1 (CET)
  - Summer (DST): UTC+2 (CEST)

Drávakeresztúr is a village in Baranya county, Hungary.

On the outskirts of the settlement, the Croatian-Hungarian border section of the “Iron Curtain” route No. 13 of the EuroVelo international cycle path network passes, the section No. 3 between Drávatamási and Drávasztára touches the village.

- Local statistics (in Hungarian)
