= Merenye =

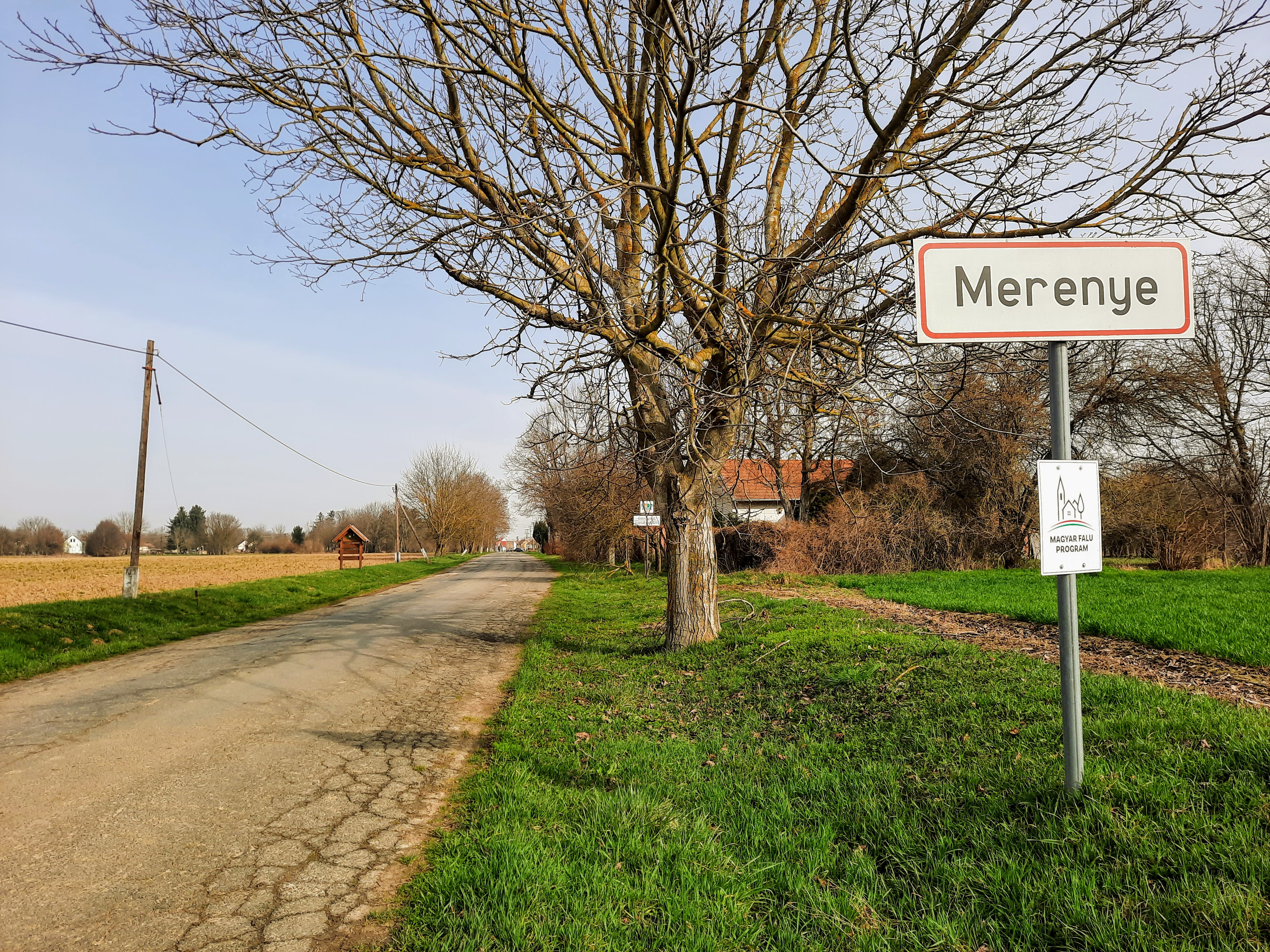

- Location of Baranya county in Hungary

- Location of Merenye
- Coordinates: 46.06913°N 17.69801°E
- Country: Hungary
- County: Baranya

Area
  - Total: 14.47 km^{2} (5.59 sq mi)

Population (2004)
  - Total: 309
  - Density: 21.35/km^{2} (55.3/sq mi)
- Time zone: UTC+1 (CET)
  - Summer (DST): UTC+2 (CEST)
- Postal code: 7981
- Area code: 73

Merenye (Croatian: Mrnja, Meren) is a village in Baranya county, Hungary.

== History ==
According to László Szita the settlement was completely Hungarian in the 18th century.
