= Somogyviszló =

- Village (Falva)
- Interactive map of Somogyviszló
- Coordinates: 46°07′N 17°46′E
- Country: Hungary
- County: Baranya

Population (2025)
  - Total: 213
- Time zone: UTC+1 (CET)
  - Summer (DST): UTC+2 (CEST)

Somogyviszló is a village in Baranya county, Hungary.
