= Szigetvár =

- Town
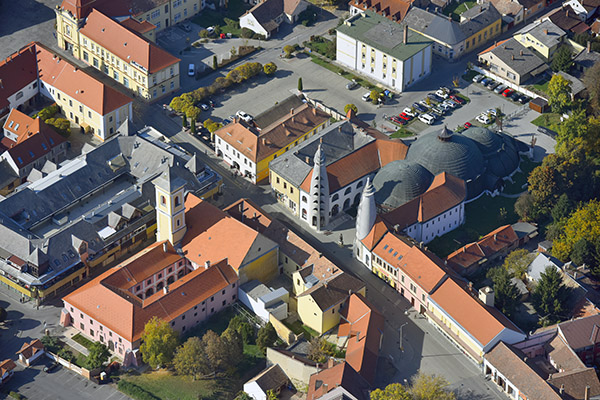
- Aerial Photography: Szigetvár – Main Square

- Flag Coat of arms
- Interactive map of Szigetvár
- Location within Hungary
- Coordinates: 46°02′51″N 17°47′58″E
- Country: Hungary
- County: Baranya
- District: Szigetvár

Area
  - Total: 39.51 km^{2} (15.25 sq mi)

Population (2009)
  - Total: 10,900
  - Density: 288.33/km^{2} (746.8/sq mi)
- Time zone: UTC+1 (CET)
  - Summer (DST): UTC+2 (CEST)
- Postal code: 7900
- Area code: (+36) 73
- Website: www.szigetvar.hu

Szigetvár (Hungarian pronunciation: [ˈsiɡɛtvaːr]; Croatian: Siget; German: Inselburg, Großsiget) is a town in Baranya County in southern Hungary. The name is a compound word composed of Sziget (Island) + vár (castle). In October 2011, the city received the title Civitas Invicta from the Hungarian Parliament. Today it has a population of 12,000.

== History ==
=== Ancient history ===
The city and its vicinity were inhabited in prehistoric times, which is confirmed by the Neolithic and Bronze Age archaeological findings (stone axes, net weights, bones) found here. After Celtic, Roman, and Avar rule, the area was conquered by the Hungarians by 900 AD.

=== Founding of Szigetvár ===
The origin of a settlement by the name “Zygeth” dates back to 1391 when a wealthy Greek family named Anthemi settled in the nearby hills and forests, probably after fleeing the Ottoman conquest of the lands between Edirne (Adrianople) and Plovdiv in the 1360s.

The fortress of Sziget had its start in 1420 when Ozsvát Anthemi (aka Oswald Antheminus or Antimus) built the first brick buildings on a hill named Lázár Island in the marshy floodplain of the Almás. The brick buildings enclosed a courtyard, and later a three-story (14 metres) high round stone tower was built. Over the decades, Ozsvát built strong ramparts and moats around the brick buildings which become the inner core of the Citadel. By 1449, there was a castrum (castle) and by 1463, a small oppidum (fortified town).

In 1463, after Ozsvát’s death, Sziget was given to the Garai family and, by 1473, it was in the possession of Ambrus Török de Enying. After Ambrus' death, in 1491, Sziget was inherited by his son Imre and in 1521 inherited by Bálint Török, who, by 1530, expanded it, strengthened it, and turned it into a true stronghold. The Inner Castle (Citadel) was expanded and reinfoced by bastions at the corners, and a drawbridge connected the Inner and Outer citadels. The marshland surrounding Sziget was turned into an artificial lake by the use of a moat system that channeled water from the Almás stream.

Bálint Török's fortified island estate was significant not only as a military base, but also as an intellectual base for the hinterland: Sebestyén Lantos Tinódi, the Hungarian creator of the genre of historical song, lived here until 1542, and Pál Istvánffy, the first Hungarian poet, had a house here the author of a poetic short story, and his son Miklós Istvánffy, a humanist historian and palatinal governor of Hungary, grew up here.

=== Age of Castle Wars ===
During Sultan Suleiman's campaign to Hungary, in 1541, in addition to taking Buda, he also took Pécs and Siklós, which are east of Szigetvár. Also during that campaign, Suleiman, fearing that Bálint Török could be a powerful opponent, captured him and kept him prisoner. In 1543, after failing to ransom Bálint, his wife, Katalin Pemflinger, gives the strategically important fortress to Habsburg Archduke Ferdinand, and King of Royal Hungary. While in captivity, Bálint Török agrees to surrender all his forts to Suleiman in exchange for his freedom, but Sziget is no longer his to give. Bálint dies in Istanbul in 1550.

By the 1550s, the Ottoman advance had captured all the small castles (forts) in the region, leaving mighty Szigetvár surrounded and alone in Ottoman occupied territory. Toygun Pasha, the governor of the Budin Eyalet, attacked in 1555, but László Kerecsényi kept the fortress safe. Disillusioned with Habsburg support, Kerecsényi resigns. Toygun Pasha was replaced by Hadım Ali Paşa, who besieged Szigetvár in 1556, but could not take it from Croatian castellan Marko Horvat Stančić. Stančić, disillusioned with Vienna's support, resigns from the duties of castellan. During the siege, the fortress suffered heavy damage and was later repaired and strengthened by Italian military engineer Pietro Ferrabosco, who used the most modern military techniques to make Szigetvár the most modern and strongest fortress in Hungary at that time. The construction of the new town began after 1556 to the south of the original town, which comes to be known as Old Town.

Castellans of Szigetvár:

- 1546, June 1 to February 12, 1550 (officially), György Seghed.
- 1550 early, - Marko Horvat Stančić, former Lieutenant of Győr, is temporary castellan.
- 1550, April 6 - May 12, 1553, Ferenc Tahy (Franjo Tahi) is capitaneus et provisor,
- 1553, May, Mátyás Porkoláb and János Budasics are temporary captains
- 1553, May 12 to July 16, 1554, Farkas Dersffy. Died and was buried at Sziget.
- 1554, July 16 to September 18, 1554, János Szermegh and Ferenc Felpéczi arrive as royal commissioners after Dersffy’s death.
- 1554, September 18 to end of November 1555, László Kerecsényi. He resigns in November but remains until February 21, 1556.
- 1556, January to February, István Zeöldi as temporary castellan
- 1556, February 21 to February 1557, Marko Horvat Stančić, held off major siege by Ali Paşa.
- 1557, February 22 to before March 29, 1558, Juraj (Grgur, Gergely) Farkašić. Died while castellan.
- 1558, March, János Palatics (Ivan Palatić).
- 1558, March 31 to August 20, 1561, Marko Horvat Stančić. This was the third time he was castellan.
- October 3, 1561 - September 7, 1566, Nikola Zrinski, on his request, was given position of castellan.

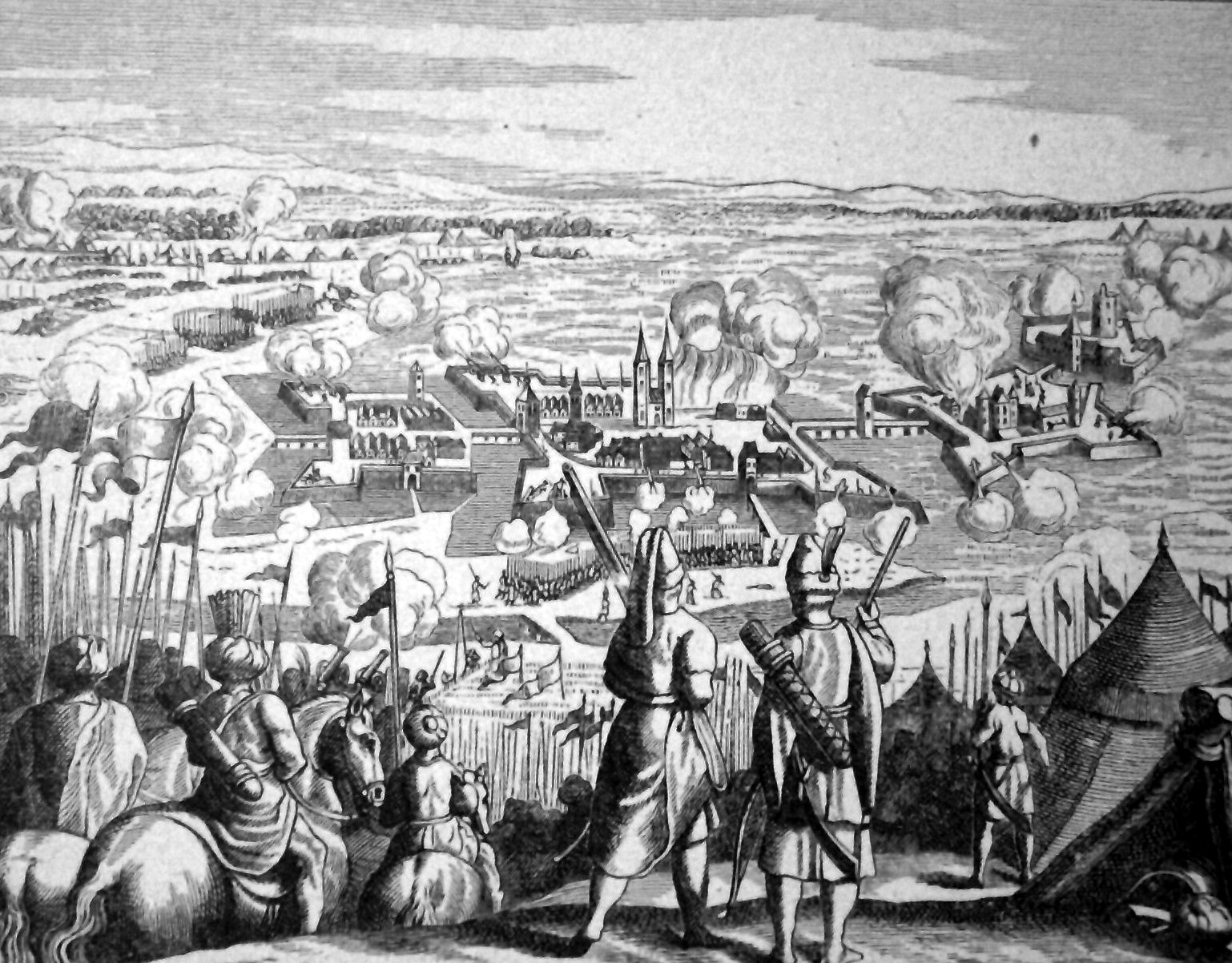
Turkish attack on the river fortress of Szigetvár (1566)

In 1561, Nikola IV Zrinski was appointed castellan of Szigetvár and tasked to keep the important fortress in Habsburg control. Under Zrinski's command, raiders from Szigetvár raided as far as the Danube, and thus threatened the security of the military and trade route between Belgrade and Buda. In 1566, Sultan Suleiman, now 72 years old and in poor health, personally leads his army to Szigetvár, which is a big thorn in his side. The fortress was besieged on August 6, Suleiman died of natural causes (old age) on September 6 or 7, and Szigetvár fell the next day, on either September 7 or 8. The siege is known for the final valiant charge by Nikola Zrinski and many of his men who preferred to die with honour than be captured and live in dishonourable captivity.

The four parts of Szigetvar in 1566: New Town, Old Town, Outer Citadel, and Inner Citadel.

After taking the castle, the Ottomans immediately rebuilt the fortress and the suburbs. The citadel itself was strengthened with brick and stone walls. Szigetvár and the region around it were organized into an Ottoman sanjak, first in the Budin Eyalet (1566–1601), later in the Kanije Eyalet (1601–1689).

Szigetvár remained in Ottoman hands until the late 17th century. With the liberation of Buda, in 1686, the southern part of Transdanubia came under Habsburg control, but Szigetvár remained in the Ottoman realm. Isolated and besieged, nearing starvation, the Ottoman garrison surrendered the fortress in February 1689. It retained its military role, with stationed within its walls, until the end of the 18th century.

=== Recent History ===
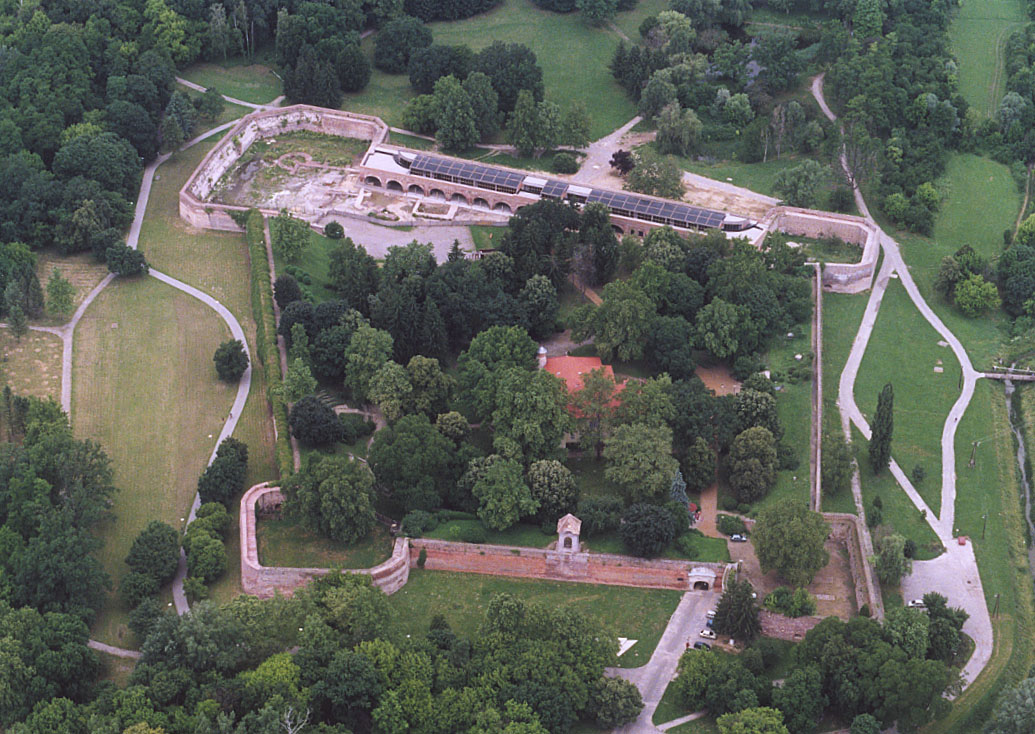
Today's part of the Szigetvár fortress, once surrounded by a river that has dried up to this day

Some other monuments in the town date back to Ottoman times. Two years after the siege, the mosque of Ali Pasha was built, later – in 1788 – to be transformed into a Christian church: the Roman Catholic parish church. The two minarets, as well as the windows and niches with ogee arches indicate its original function. The Turkish House of red raw brick walls and interlaced steel window grills in Bástya Street was originally destined to be a caravanserai. The two holy-water basins of the Franciscan Church were made of Turkish washbasins. The carved main altar of the Baroque Church is another sight to see. In 1966, on the 400th anniversary of the siege, Szigetvár regained its old rank of a chartered ancient city. Development began to gather speed.

In 1994, the Hungarian-Turkish Friendship Park (Hungarian: Magyar-Török Barátság Park) was established as a public park, dedicated in memorial to the Battle of Szigetvár.

Archaeological digs conducted by the University of Pécs starting in 2016 revealed the tomb of Sultan Suleiman the Magnificent in the nearby destroyed settlement of Turbék.

== Twin towns – sister cities ==
Szigetvár is twinned with:

- Čakovec, Croatia
- Deva, Romania
- Eppingen, Germany
- Imatra, Finland
- Pag, Croatia
- Slatina, Croatia
- Trabzon, Turkey

== Gallery ==
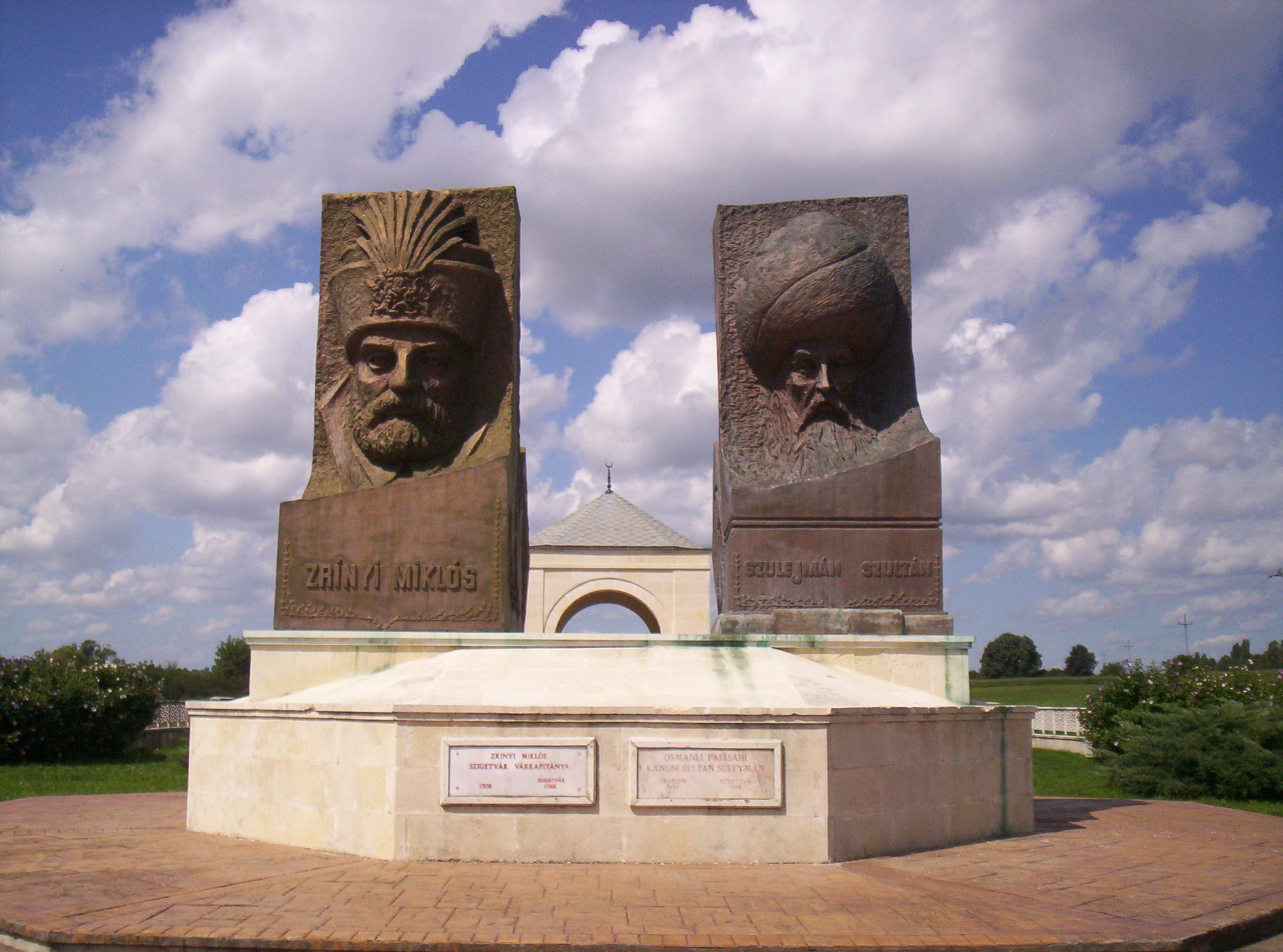
Turkish-Hungarian Friendship Park in Szigetvar depicting the two great leaders

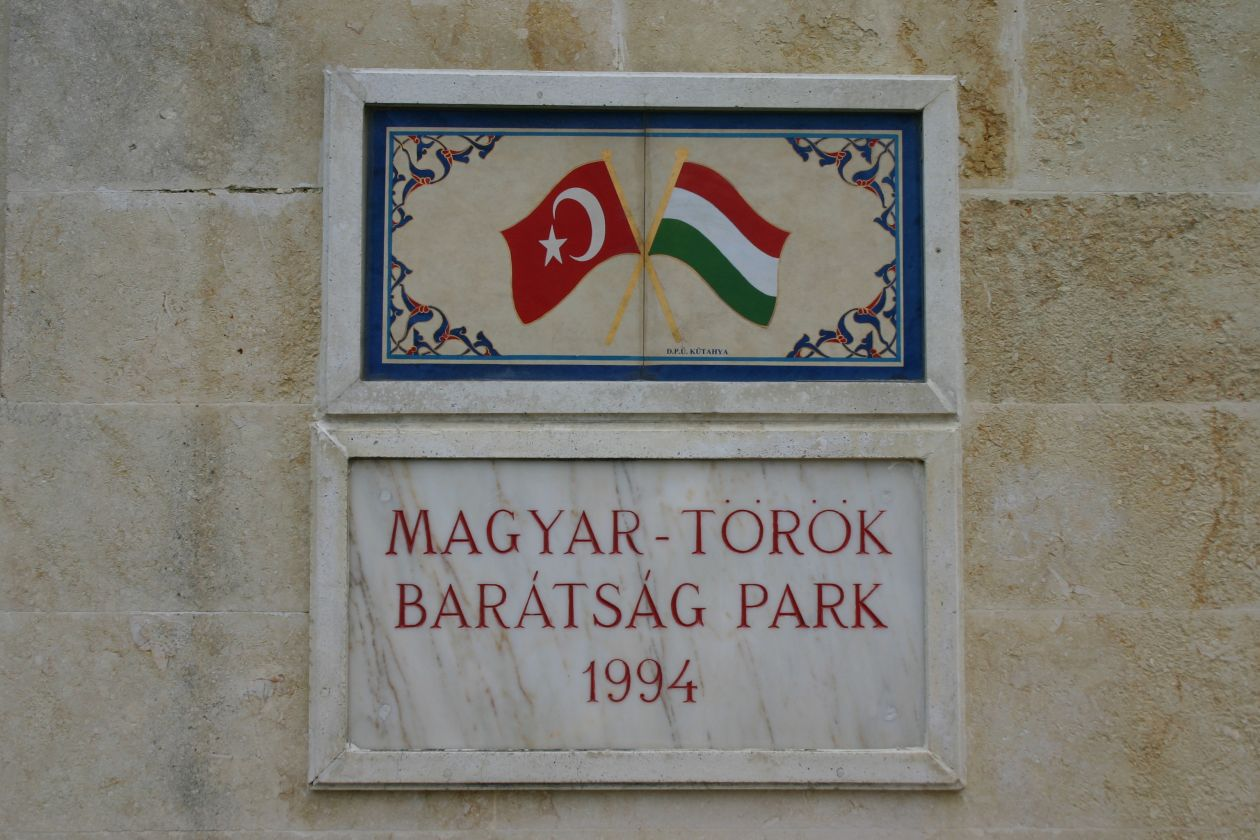
A plaque at the Turkish-Hungarian Friendship Park in Szigetvar

== See also ==
- Nikola IV Zrinski
