= Bóly District =

Bóly District Bólyi járás
- Districts of Hungary
- Coat of arms

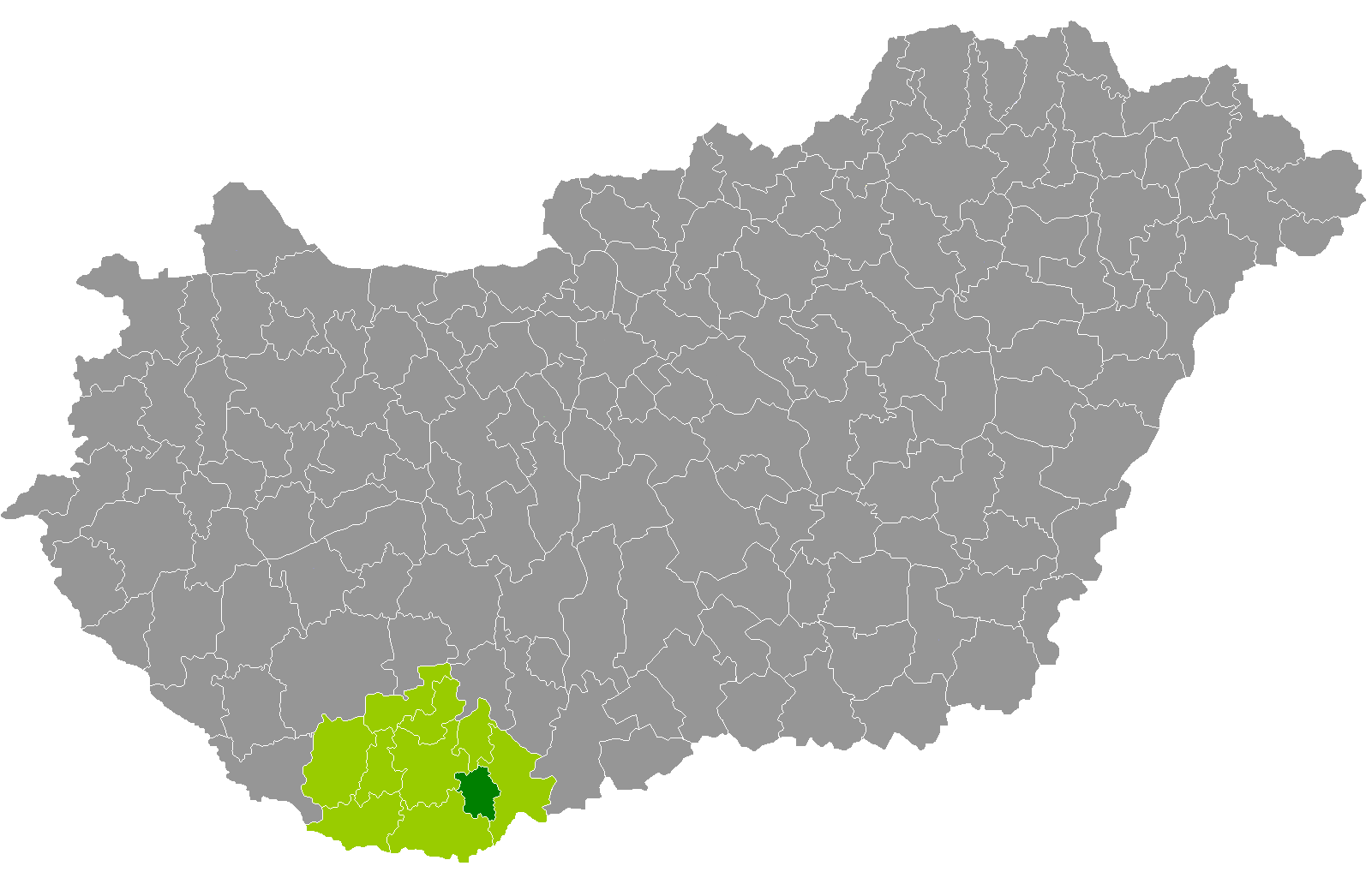
- Bóly District within Hungary and Baranya County
- Coordinates: 45.96°N 18.52°E
- Country: Hungary
- County: Baranya
- District seat: Bóly

Area
  - Total: 220.03 km^{2} (84.95 sq mi)
  - Rank: 10th in Baranya

Population (2011 census)
  - Total: 11,956
  - Rank: 9th in Baranya
  - Density: 54/km^{2} (140/sq mi)

Bóly (Hungarian: Bólyi járás) is a district in central-eastern part of Baranya County. Bóly is also the name of the town where the district seat is located. The district is in the Southern Transdanubia Statistical Region.

== Geography ==
Bóly District borders with Pécsvárad District to the north, Mohács District to the east, Siklós District to the southwest, Pécs District to the northwest. The number of the inhabited places in Bóly District is 16.

== Municipalities ==
The district has 1 town and 15 villages. (ordered by population, as of 1 January 2012)

=== Town ===
- Bóly (3,996) – district seat

=== Villages ===
- Babarc (729)
- Belvárdgyula (402)
- Borjád (388)
- Hásságy (248)
- Kisbudmér (124)
- Liptód (203)
- Máriakéménd (588)
- Monyoród (182)
- Nagybudmér (192)
- Olasz (630)
- Pócsa (181)
- Szajk (852)
- Szederkény (1,830)
- Töttös (573)
- Versend (937)

== See also ==
- List of cities and towns in Hungary
