= Hásságy =

Hásságy Haschad
- Municipality
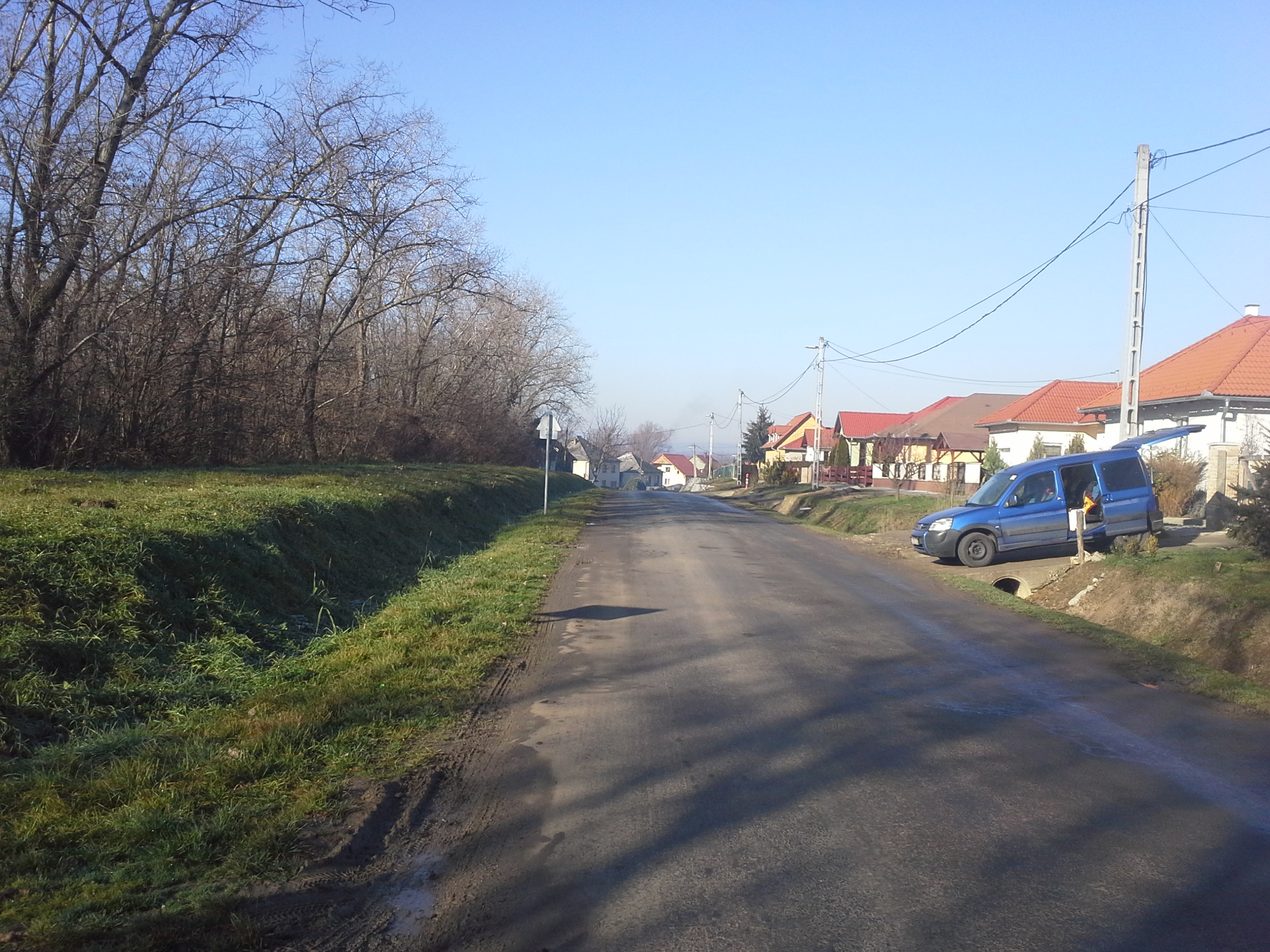

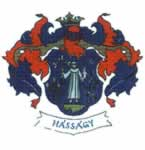
- Coat of arms

- Location within Hungary.
- Coordinates: 46°2′0″N 18°23′0″E
- Country: Hungary
- Region: Southern Transdanubia
- County: Baranya
- District: Bóly

Government
  - Type: Mayor-council government
  - Mayor: László Lajos Rácz (Ind.)

Area
  - Total: 8 km^{2} (3.1 sq mi)

Population (2022)
  - Total: 278
  - Density: 35/km^{2} (90/sq mi)
- Time zone: UTC+1 (CET)
  - Summer (DST): UTC+2 (CEST)
- Postal code: 7745
- Area code: 69
- Geocode: 27881
- Website: www.hassagy.hu

Hásságy (German: Haschad; Croatian: Ašađ) is a village and municipality (Hungarian: község) in Baranya county, in southern Hungary.

== Geography ==
Hásságy is located on Hásságy Pond (Hungarian: Hásságyi-halastó) in Baranya County, about 17 kilometers southeast of Pécs and 15 kilometers northwest of Bóly. It is about 20 kilometers west of the Danube, 30 kilometers from Croatia and 50 kilometers from Serbia. The municipality lies within the Southern Transdanubia Region of Hungary. It previously was part of the Mohács Subregion but during the creation of districts in 2013, it became part of Bóly District.

== Demographics ==
During the census of 2011, the population was 266. The vast majority of the population claimed Hungarian ethnicity (94.9%), though 45.6% also claimed German ethnicity and the municipality has a German local minority self-government. Other ethnicities included Croatian (1.5%). 3.7% did not wish to answer. In terms of religious practice, 84.2% reported to be Roman Catholic, 4% Calvinist, 5.5% of no religious affiliation and 4.8% did not wish to answer.

== Transport ==
The closest railway station is in Pécs, 16 kilometers to the northwest. The village lies near the M60 motorway, which opened in the area in 2010 and currently provides links west to Pécs and north to Budapest (via the M6 motorway), and will eventually provide links to the Croatian border at Ivándárda and Barcs.
