= Kisbudmér =

Kisbudmér Kleinbudmer
- Municipality
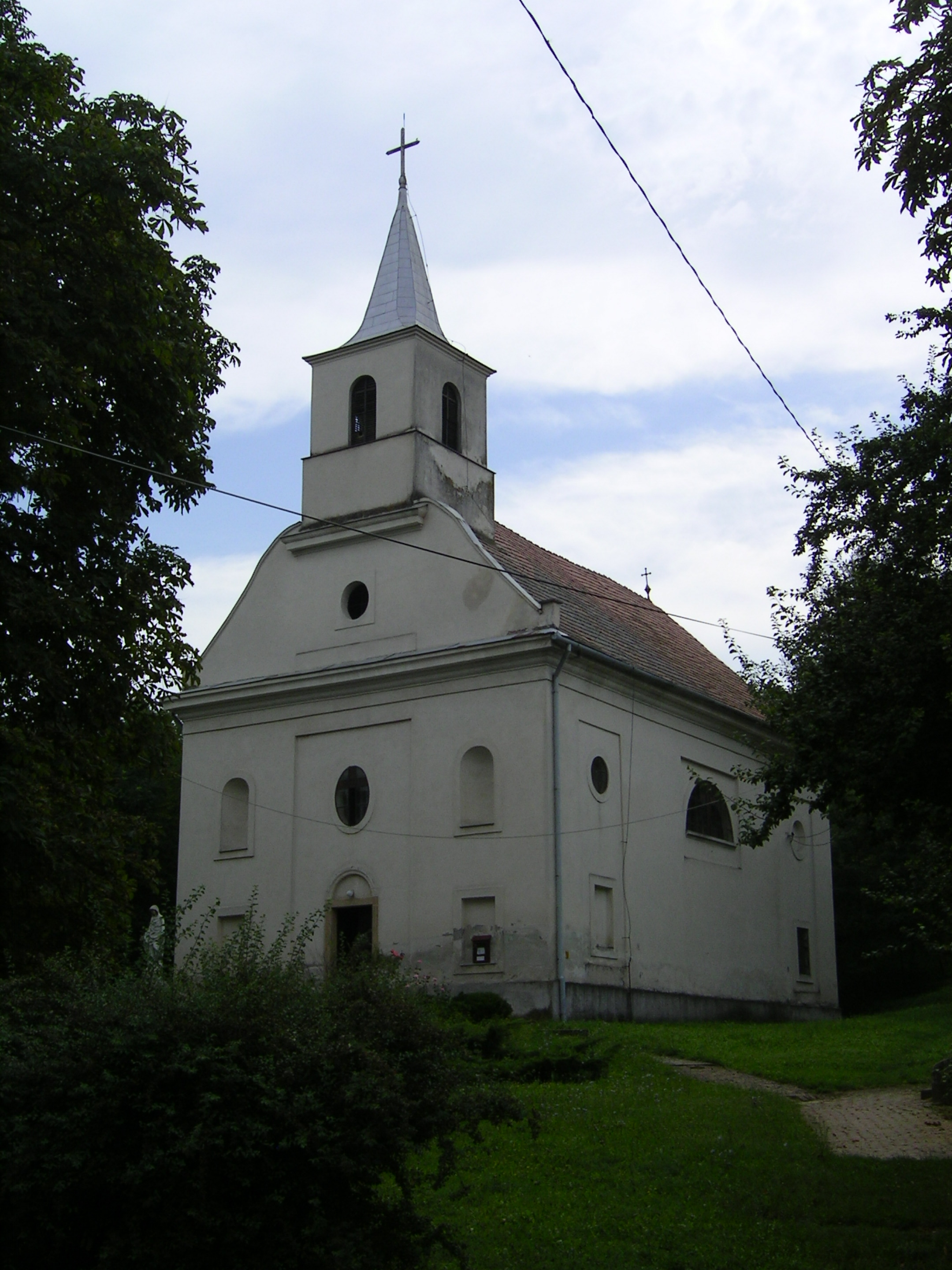

- Location within Hungary.
- Coordinates: 45°54′53″N 18°26′46″E
- Country: Hungary
- Region: Southern Transdanubia
- County: Baranya
- District: Bóly

Government
  - Type: Mayor-council government
  - Mayor: Ferenc Kelemen (Ind.)

Area
  - Total: 5.72 km^{2} (2.21 sq mi)

Population (2022)
  - Total: 87
  - Density: 15/km^{2} (39/sq mi)
- Time zone: UTC+1 (CET)
  - Summer (DST): UTC+2 (CEST)
- Postal code: 7756
- Area code: 69
- Geocode: 22868

Kisbudmér (German: Kleinbudmer; Croatian: Mali Budmir) is a village and municipality (Hungarian: község) in Baranya county, Hungary.

== Etymology ==
The name comes from Slavic personal name Budimír. Budmer (1291).

Until the end of World War II, the inhabitants' majority was Danube Swabian, also called locally as Stifolder, because their ancestors arrived in the 17th and 18th centuries from Fulda (district). Most of the former German settlers were expelled to Allied-occupied Germany and Allied-occupied Austria in 1945–1948, pursuant to the Potsdam Agreement. Only a few Germans of Hungary live there, the majority today are the descendants of Hungarians from the Czechoslovak–Hungarian population exchange. They got the houses of the former Danube Swabian inhabitants.

== Geography ==
Kisbudmér is located in Baranya County, about 25 kilometers southeast of Pécs, 9 kilometers southwest of Bóly and 13 kilometers north of Villány. It is about 25 kilometers west of the Danube, 20 kilometers from Croatia and 40 kilometers from Serbia. The municipality lies within the Southern Transdanubia Region of Hungary. It previously was part of the Mohács Subregion but during the creation of districts in 2013, it became part of Bóly District.

== Demographics ==
During the census of 2011, the population was 113. The vast majority of the population claimed Hungarian ethnicity (92.2%). Other ethnicities claimed included Roma (4.3%), German (3.4%), Romanian (1.7%) and Other (1.7%). 6% did not wish to answer. In terms of religious practice, 44% reported to be Roman Catholic, 4.3% Calvinist, 21.6% of no religious affiliation and 29.3% did not wish to answer.

== Transport ==
The closest railway station is in Villány, 13.6 kilometers to the south.
