= M60 motorway (Hungary) =

Road in Hungary

M60 motorway
- M60-as autópálya
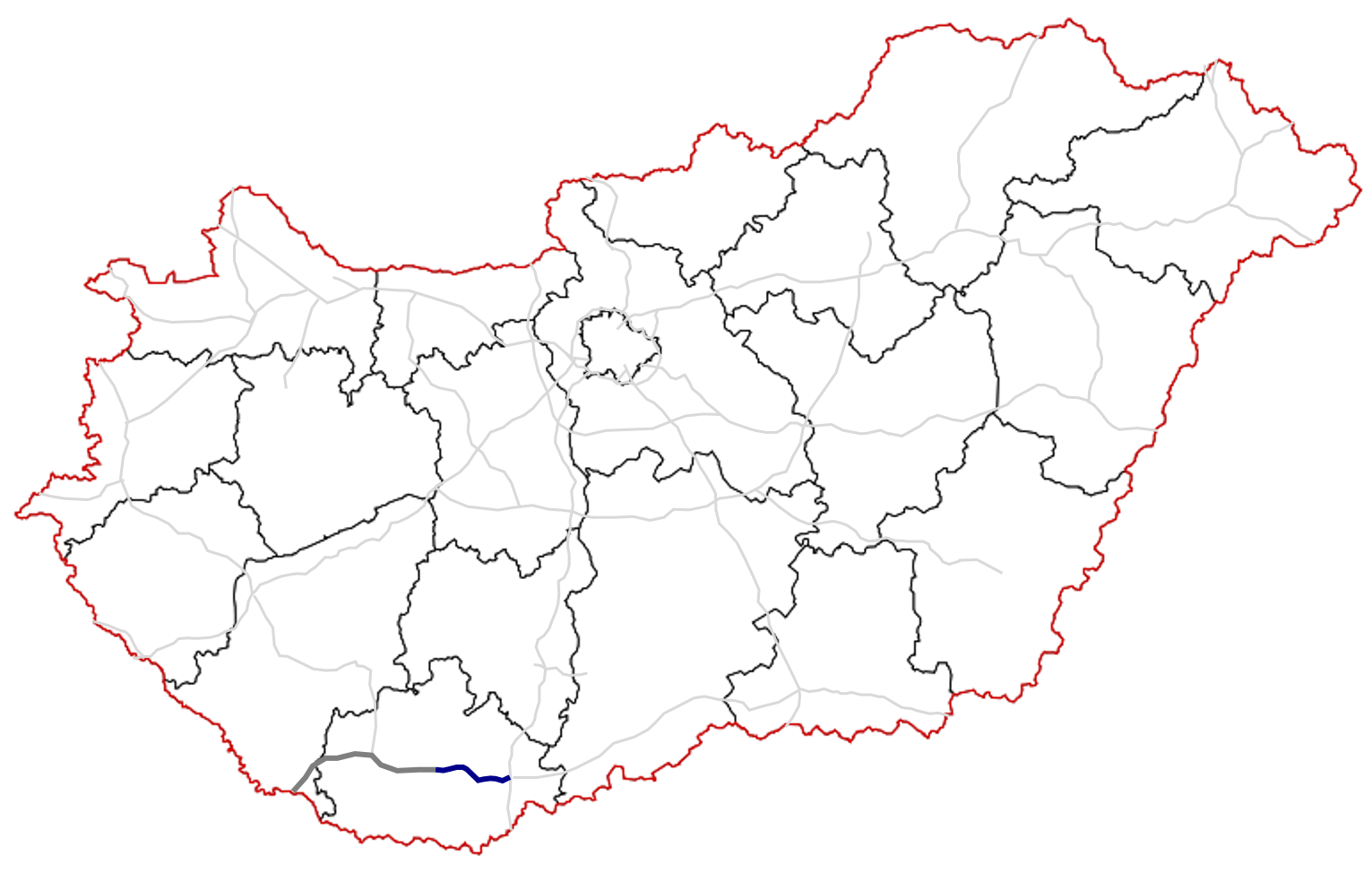
- in use planned other highways

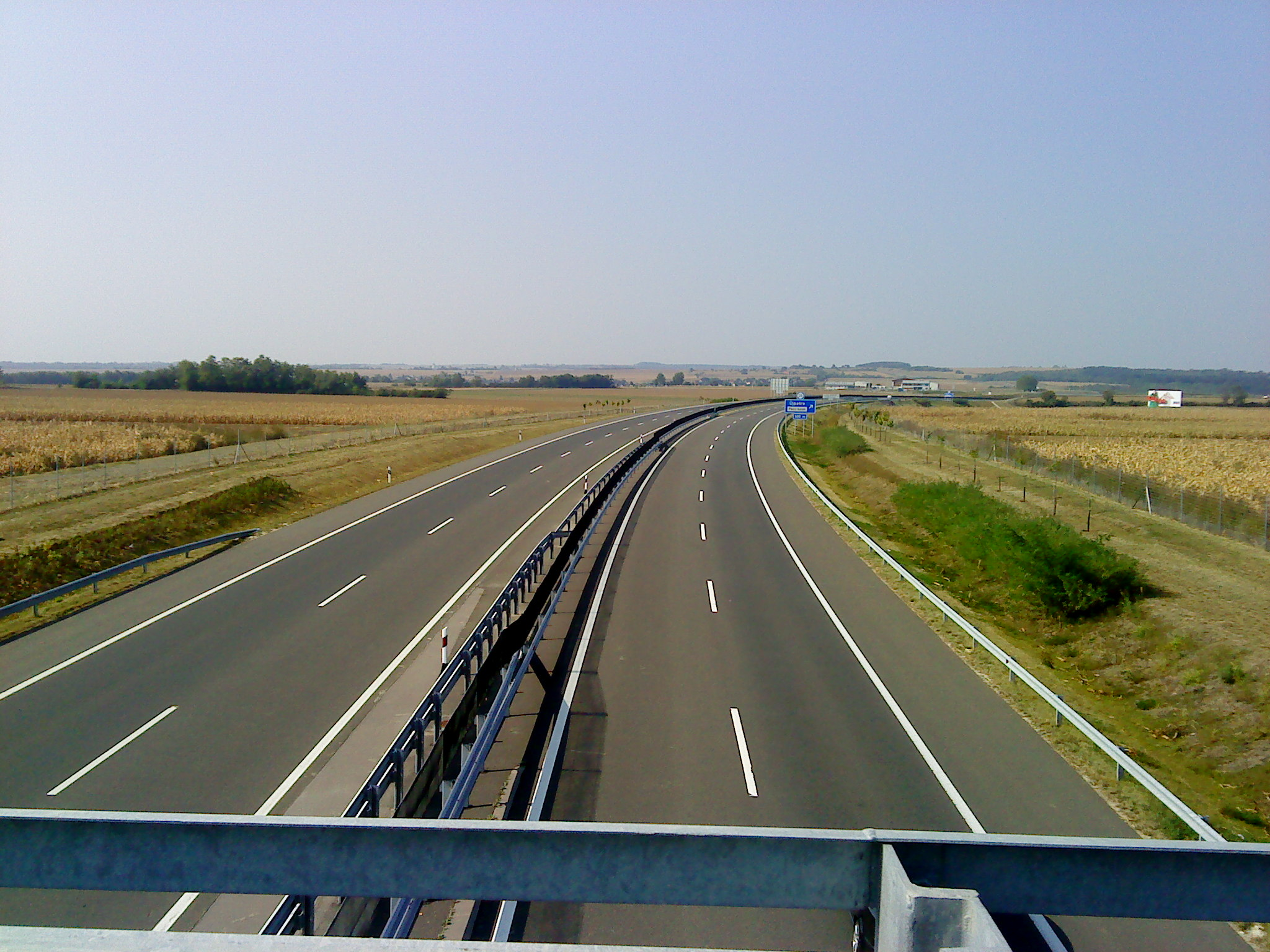
- M60 near Kozármisleny

Route information
- Length: 30.2 km (18.8 mi) 56 km (35 mi) planned

Major junctions
- From: M6 near Bóly
- To: Barcs; A13 border with Croatia

Location
- Country: Hungary
- Counties: Baranya
- Major cities: Pécs, Szigetvár

Highway system
- Roads in Hungary; Highways; Main roads; Local roads

The M60 motorway (Hungarian: M60-as autópálya) is 56 km long. It begins at the Bóly interchange on the M6 and ends at Pécs. A future extension to the Croatian border at Barcs is planned. When finished, it will connect Pécs with Zagreb.

== Municipalities ==
The M60 motorway runs through the following municipalities:

- Baranya County: Babarc, Szajk, Versend, Monyoród, Szederkény, Belvárdgyula, Birján, Lothárd, Szemely, Kozármisleny, Pécsudvard, Pécs

== Openings timeline ==
- Bóly; M6 – Pécs (30 km): 2010.03.31.
- Pécs – Pécs-Kökény út (1.8 km): 2015.07.31. - half profile

== Junctions, exits and rest area ==
- The route is full length motorway. The maximum speed limit is 130km/h.

M60 (BÓLY - BARCS)
Exit	km	Destinations	Notes
Interchange	0	Dunaújváros, Budapest / Ivándárda	The road turns toward Budapest or the border Osijek
Rest area	3	Szajk rest area	
Exit	6	Szajk / Bóly, Villány	
Bridge		Belvárdgyulai völgyhíd - 440 m	
Rest area	15	Birján rest area (plan)	
Exit	25	Újpetre / Pécs-East	
Exit	30	Harkány, Drávaszabolcs / Pécs-Centrum	
Roundabout	32	Pécs-Kökény Street	

== See also ==
- Roads in Hungary
- Transport in Hungary
