= Liptód =

Liptód Litowr
- Municipality
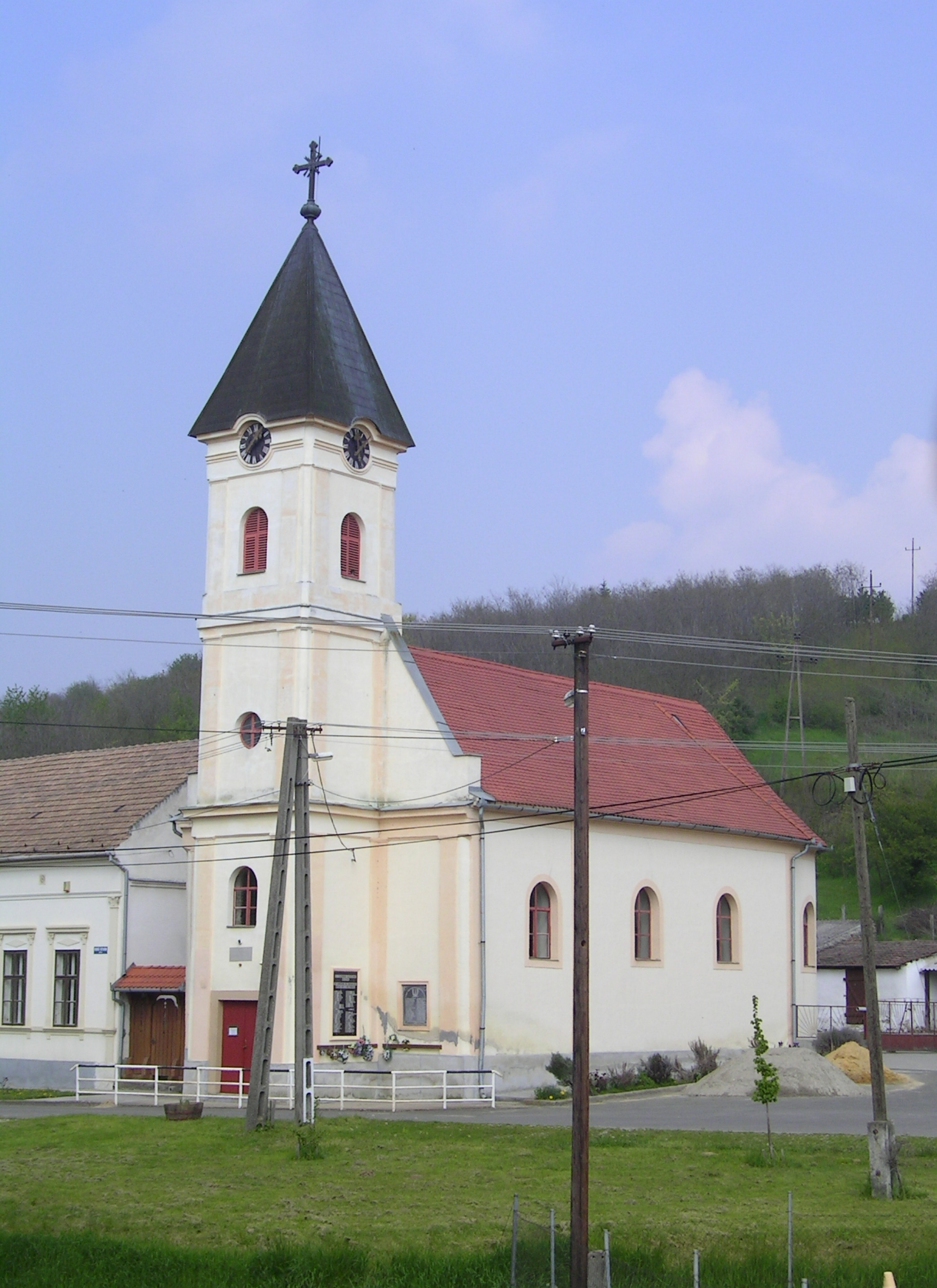

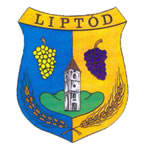
- Coat of arms

- Location within Hungary.
- Coordinates: 46°2′42.65″N 18°31′0.52″E
- Country: Hungary
- Region: Southern Transdanubia
- County: Baranya
- District: Bóly

Government
  - Type: Mayor-council government
  - Mayor: Mária Heilmann (Ind.)

Area
  - Total: 14.99 km^{2} (5.79 sq mi)

Population (2018)
  - Total: 183
  - Density: 12.2/km^{2} (31.6/sq mi)
- Time zone: UTC+1 (CET)
  - Summer (DST): UTC+2 (CEST)
- Postal code: 7758
- Area code: 69
- Geocode: 10038
- Website: www.liptod.hu

Liptód (German: Litowr; Croatian: Litoba) is a village and municipality (Hungarian: község) in Baranya County, Hungary.

== Geography ==
Liptód is located in east central Baranya County, about 30 kilometers east of Pécs and 10 kilometers north of Bóly. It is about 10 kilometers west of the Danube, 20 kilometers from Croatia and 50 kilometers from Serbia. The municipality lies within the Southern Transdanubia Region of Hungary. It previously was part of the Mohács Subregion but during the creation of districts in 2013, it became part of Bóly District.

== Demographics ==
During the census of 2011, the population was 201. The vast majority of the population claimed Hungarian ethnicity (94.3%), though 50.7% also claimed German ethnicity and the municipality has a German local minority self-government. Other ethnicities included Roma (2.8%) and Croatian (1.4%). 1.9% did not wish to answer. In terms of religious practice, 70.6% reported to be Roman Catholic, 3.3% Calvinist, 10.9% of no religious affiliation and 14.2% did not wish to answer.

== Transport ==
The closest railway station is in Mohács, 19 kilometers to the east. The village lies near the junction of motorways M6 and M60, both of which opened in the area in 2010 and currently provide links north to Budapest and west to Pécs, and will eventually provide links to the Croatian border at Ivándárda and Barcs.
