= Máriakéménd =

Máriakéménd Mariakemend
- Municipality
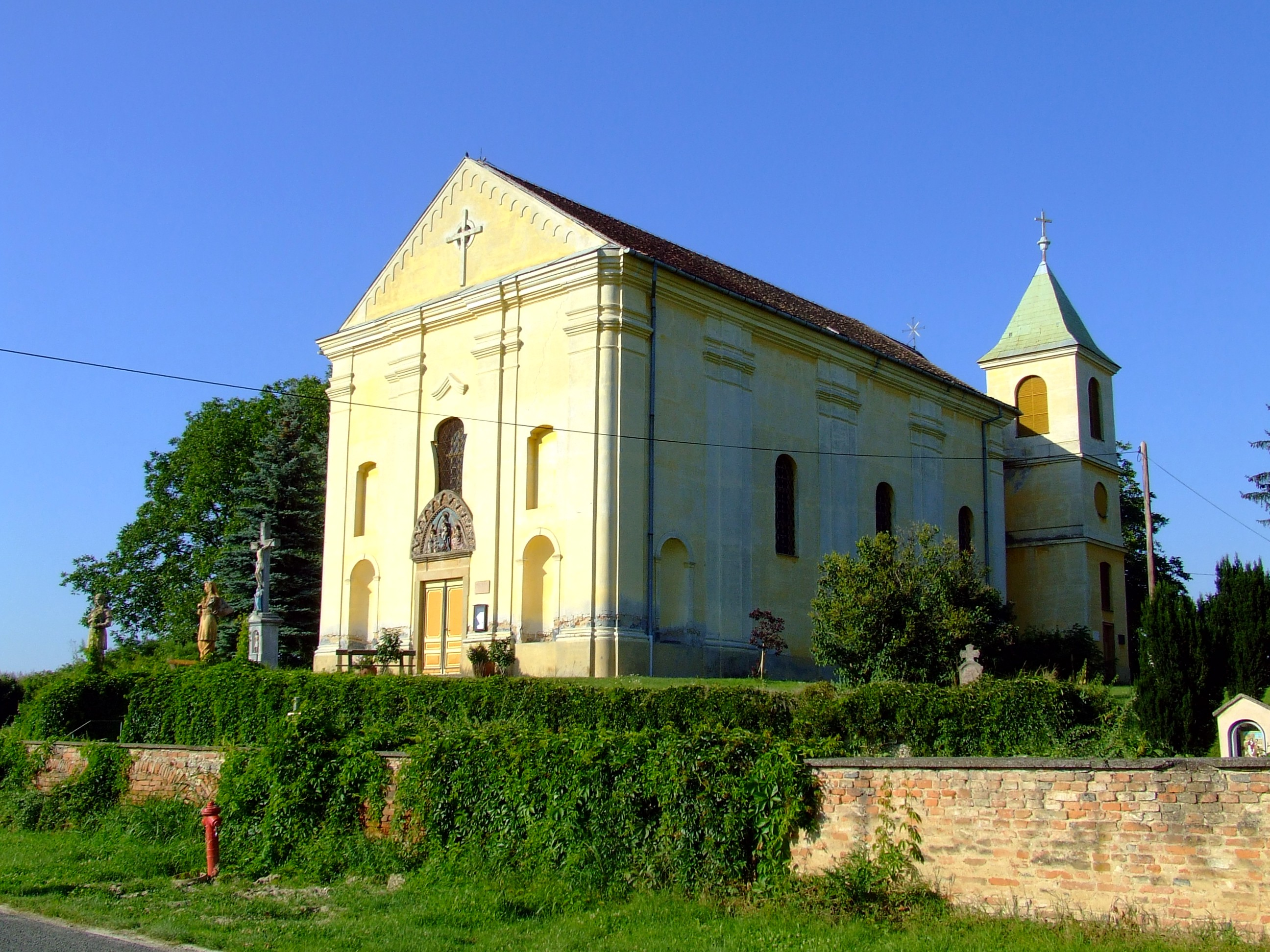

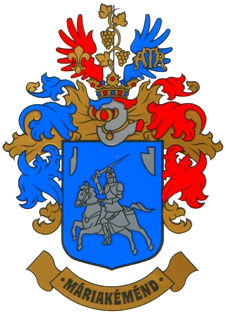
- Coat of arms

- Location within Hungary.
- Coordinates: 46°1′30.58″N 18°27′46.26″E
- Country: Hungary
- Region: Southern Transdanubia
- County: Baranya
- District: Bóly

Government
  - Type: Mayor-council government
  - Mayor: Csabáné Jeszán (Ind.)

Area
  - Total: 15.78 km^{2} (6.09 sq mi)

Population (2018)
  - Total: 503
  - Density: 31.9/km^{2} (82.6/sq mi)
- Time zone: UTC+1 (CET)
  - Summer (DST): UTC+2 (CEST)
- Postal code: 7663
- Area code: 69
- Geocode: 14483

Máriakéménd (German: Mariakemend or Kemend; Croatian: Kemed) is a village and municipality (Hungarian: község) in Baranya County, Hungary.

== History ==
Until the end of World War II, the inhabitants' majority was Danube Swabian, whose ancestors arrived from Stift Fulda (district) and named in the Danube Swabian dialect, Stiffuller. Most of the former German settlers were expelled to Germany and Austria in 1945-1948, following the Potsdam Agreement.

== Geography ==
Máriakéménd is located in east central Baranya County, about 30 kilometers east of Pécs and 10 kilometers north of Bóly. It is about 20 kilometers west of the Danube, 25 kilometers from Croatia and 50 kilometers from Serbia. The municipality lies within the Southern Transdanubia Region of Hungary. It previously was part of the Mohács Subregion but during the creation of districts in 2013, it became part of Bóly District.

== Demographics ==
During the census of 2011, the population was 502. The vast majority of the population claimed Hungarian ethnicity (95%), though 15.9% also claimed German and 7% claimed Roma ethnicity and the municipality has a German local minority self-government and Roma local minority self-government. 4.8% did not wish to answer. In terms of religious practice, 60.7% reported to be Roman Catholic, 5.4% Calvinist, 3.3% Lutheran, 17.8% of no religious affiliation and 12% did not wish to answer.

== Transport ==
The closest railway station is in Pécs, 28 kilometers to the east. The village lies near the junction of motorways M6 and M60, both of which opened in the area in 2010 and currently provide links north to Budapest and west to Pécs, and will eventually provide links to the Croatian border at Ivándárda and Barcs.

== Points of Interest ==
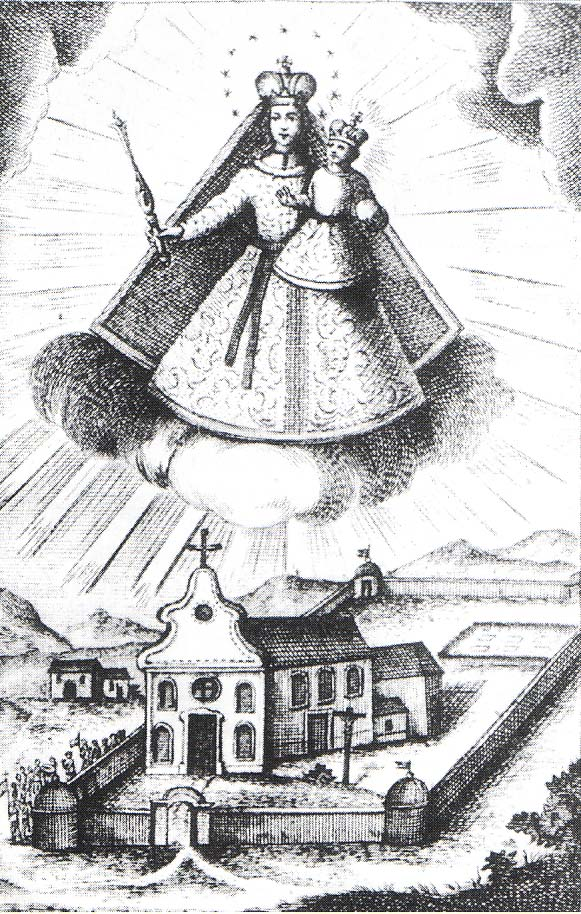
- An engraving of the Máriakéménd statue and the Church of our Lady, János Fülöp Binder, 1774.
  The Church of our Lady of the Assumption, a Catholic pilgrimage church. Its current structure was built in 1753 in Baroque style following the witnessing of a Marian apparition by local girls playing in the ruins of the former Church of St. Nicholas, originally built in the 15th century.
- The Church of St. Martin, built in 1797.
- The ruins of a 13th-century Ottoman castle, which can be found on Castle Hill near the village.
