= Pócsa =

Pócsa Bootsch
- Municipality
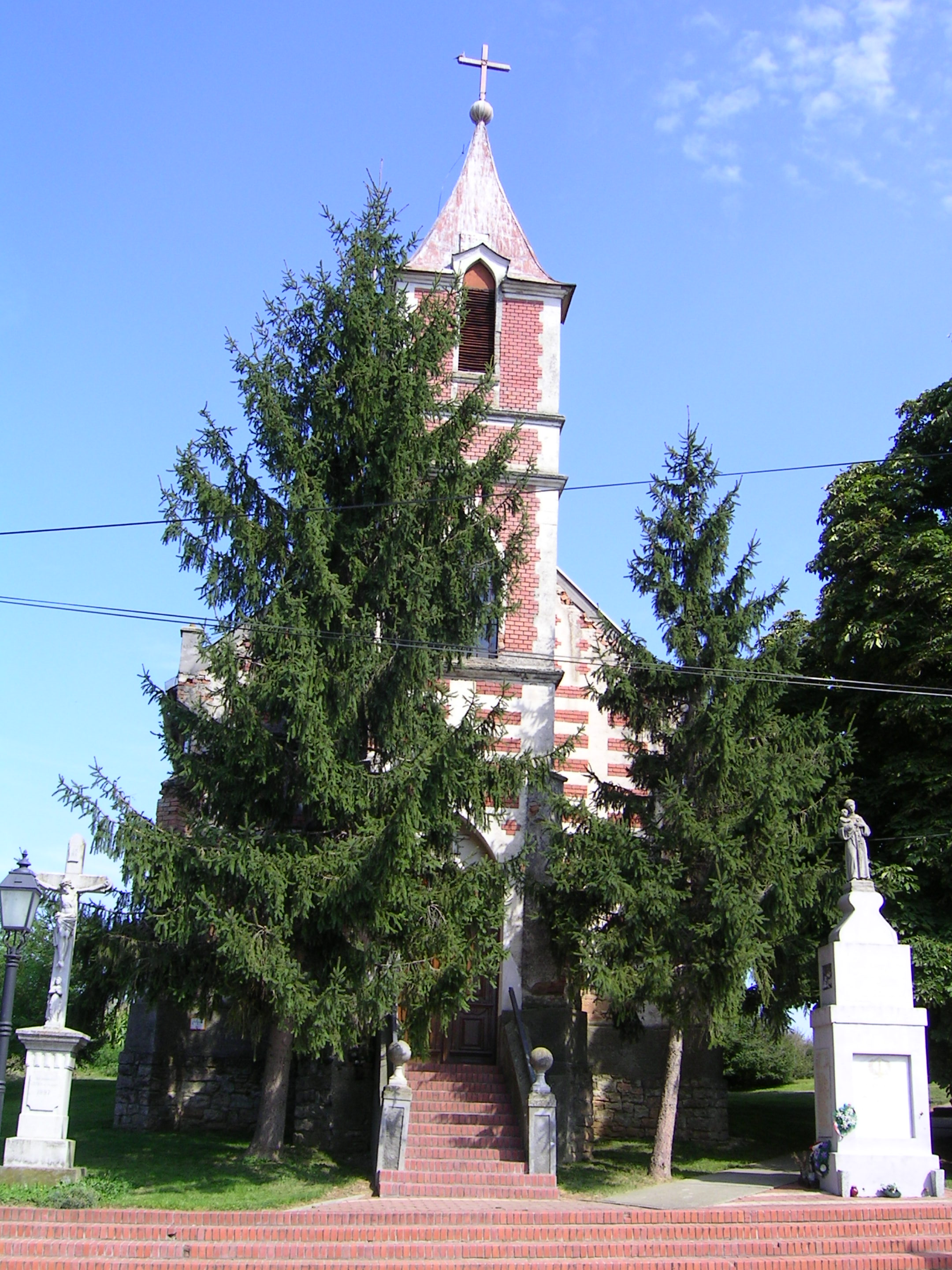

- Coat of arms

- Location within Hungary.
- Coordinates: 45°54′44.89″N 18°28′13.76″E
- Country: Hungary
- Region: Southern Transdanubia
- County: Baranya
- District: Bóly

Government
  - Type: Mayor-council government
  - Mayor: Sándor Nyisztor (Ind.)

Area
  - Total: 8.05 km^{2} (3.11 sq mi)

Population (2018)
  - Total: 155
  - Density: 19.3/km^{2} (49.9/sq mi)
- Time zone: UTC+1 (CET)
  - Summer (DST): UTC+2 (CEST)
- Postal code: 7756
- Area code: 69
- Geocode: 22266

Pócsa (German: Bootsch) is a village and municipality (Hungarian: község) in Baranya county, Hungary. Residents are Magyars, with minority of Germans. Until the end of World War II, the inhabitants' majority was Danube Swabian, also called locally as Stifolder, because their ancestors arrived in the 17th and 18th centuries from Fulda (district). Most of the former German settlers were expelled to Allied-occupied Germany and Allied-occupied Austria in 1945–1948, as a result of the Potsdam Agreement. Only a few Germans of Hungary live there, the majority today are the descendants of Hungarians from the Czechoslovak–Hungarian population exchange. They got the houses of the former Danube Swabian inhabitants.

== Geography ==
Pócsa is located in east central Baranya County, about 5 kilometers north of Villány, 7 kilometers from Bóly and 25 kilometers from Pécs. The municipality lies within the Southern Transdanubia Region of Hungary. It previously was part of the Mohács Subregion but during the creation of districts in 2013, it became part of Bóly District.

== Demographics ==
During the census of 2011, the population was 178. The vast majority of the population claimed Hungarian ethnicity (95%), though 30.3% also claimed German ethnicity and the municipality has a German local minority self-government. Other ethnicities included Roma (1.6%), Croatian (1.1%) and Romanian (1.1%). 3.8% did not wish to answer. In terms of religious practice, 71.4% reported to be Roman Catholic, 4.9% Calvinist, 0.5% Lutheran, 5.4% of no religious affiliation and 17.8% did not wish to answer.

== Transport ==
The closest railway station is in Villány, 5 kilometers to the south.
