= Olasz =

Olasz Ahlaß, Olas
- Municipality
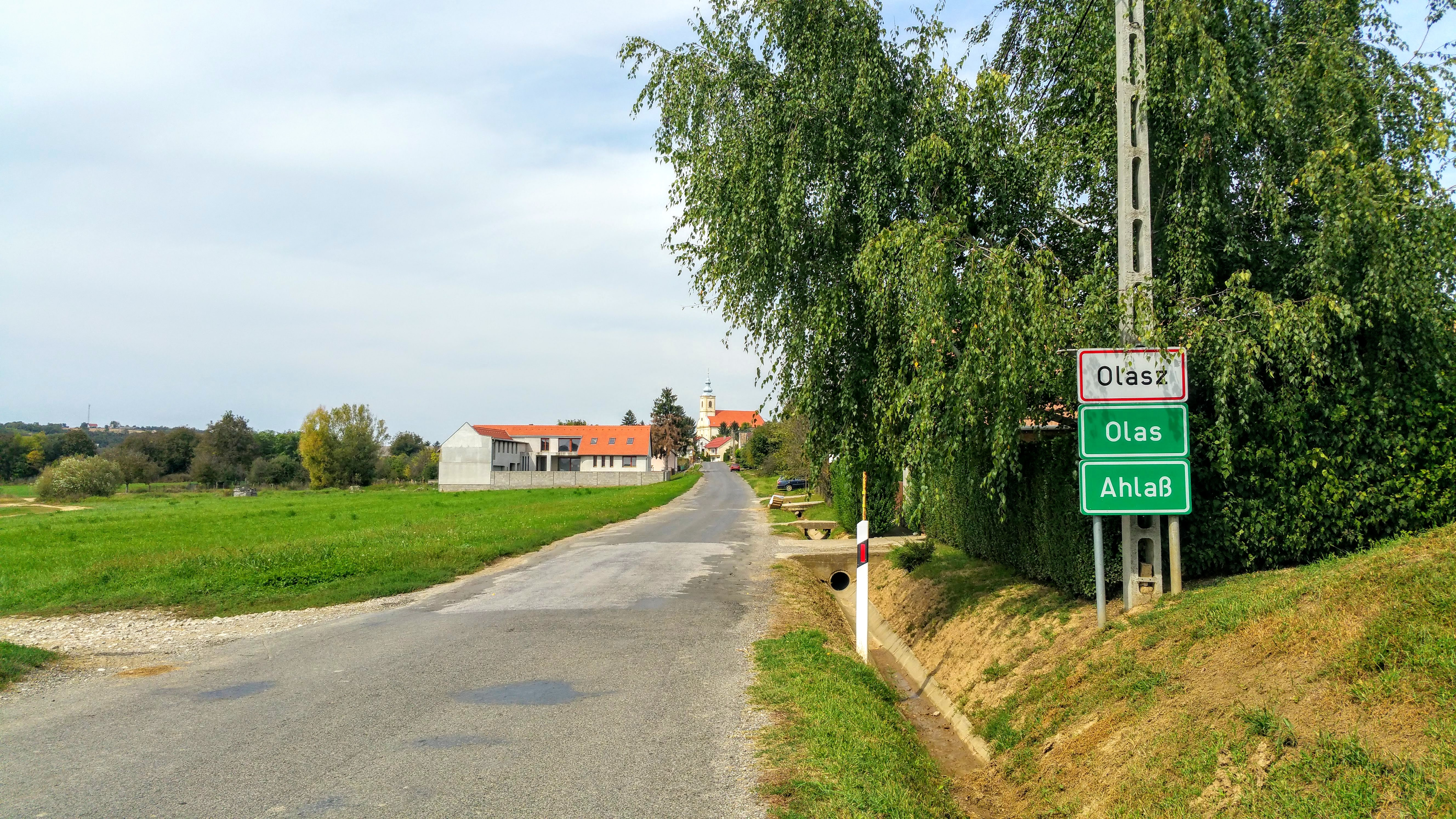

- Coat of arms

- Location within Hungary.
- Coordinates: 46°0′44.82″N 18°24′47.77″E
- Country: Hungary
- Region: Southern Transdanubia
- County: Baranya
- District: Bóly

Government
  - Type: Mayor-council government
  - Mayor: Gabriella Tóth (Ind.)

Area
  - Total: 10.29 km^{2} (3.97 sq mi)

Population (2018)
  - Total: 637
  - Density: 61.9/km^{2} (160/sq mi)
- Time zone: UTC+1 (CET)
  - Summer (DST): UTC+2 (CEST)
- Postal code: 7745
- Area code: 69
- Geocode: 18555

Olasz (Croatian: Olas; German: Ahlaß) is a village and municipality (Hungarian: község) in Baranya County, Hungary.

== Etymology ==
The name of the village is ultimately a Hungarianised term derived from the German word walha which Hungarians otherwise use as a root for their exonym of Italy (Olaszország).

== Geography ==
Olasz is located in Baranya County, about 20 kilometers southeast of Pécs and about 10 kilometers northwest of Bóly. The municipality lies within the Southern Transdanubia Region of Hungary. It previously was part of the Mohács Subregion but during the creation of districts in 2013, it became part of Bóly District.

== Demographics ==
During the census of 2011, the population was 627. The vast majority of the population claimed Hungarian ethnicity (87.4%), though 29% also claimed German ethnicity and 8.8% claimed Croatian ethnicity, and the municipality has a German and Croatian local minority self-government. Other ethnicities claimed included Roma (1.4%), Serbian (0.5%) and Other (1.3%). 12.4% did not wish to answer. In terms of religious practice, 62.3% reported to be Roman Catholic, 3.5% Calvinist, 11.5% of no religious affiliation and 21.5% did not wish to answer.

== Transport ==
The closest railway station is in Bóly, 10 kilometers to the southeast.
