= Babarc =

Babarc Bawarz
- Municipality
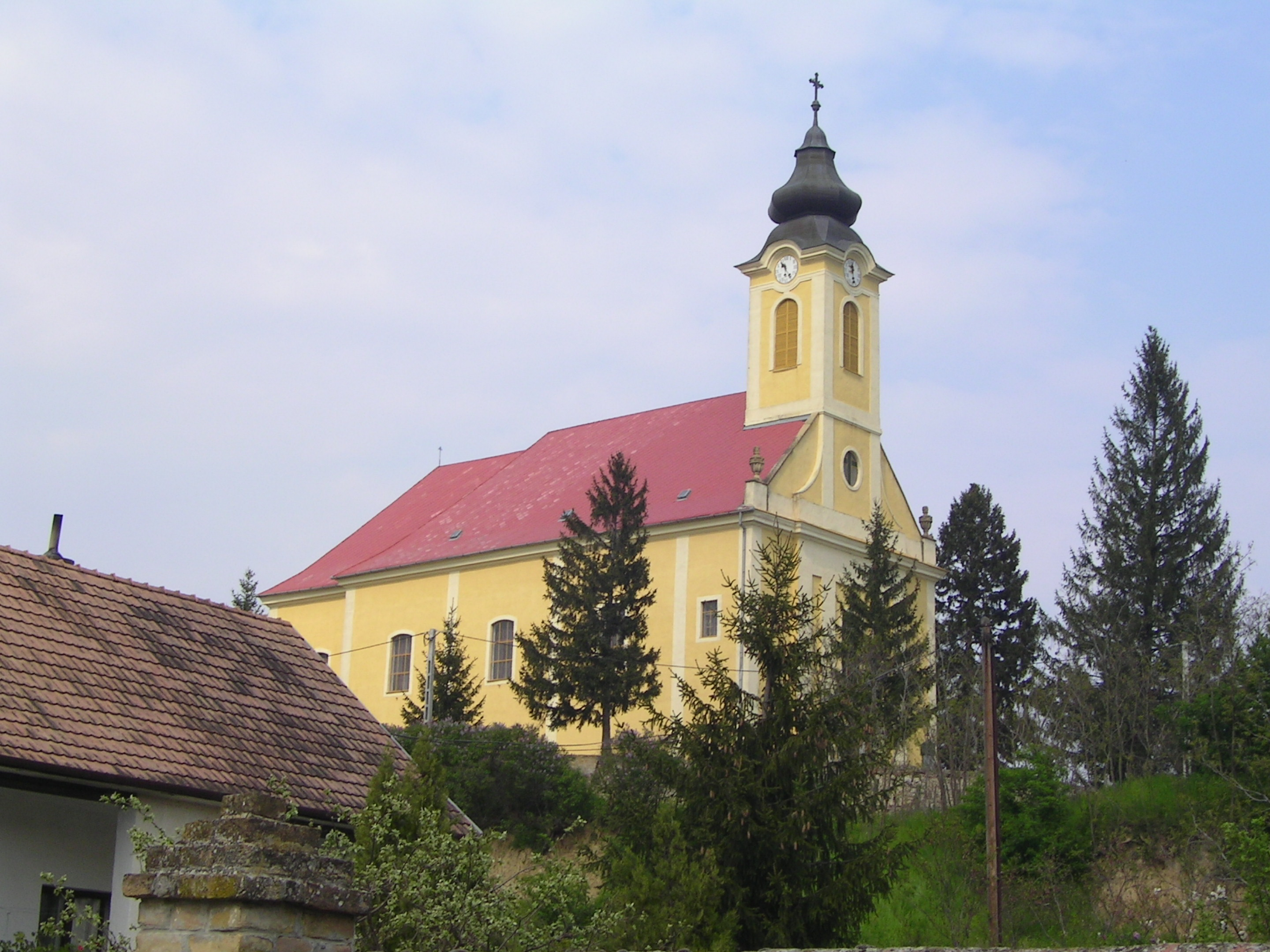

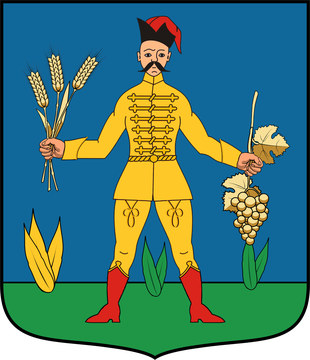
- Coat of arms

- Location within Hungary.
- Coordinates: 46.00323°N 18.55403°E
- Country: Hungary
- Region: Southern Transdanubia
- County: Baranya
- District: Bóly

Government
  - Type: Mayor-council government
  - Mayor: Sándor Pécsi (Ind.)

Area
  - Total: 18.85 km^{2} (7.28 sq mi)

Population (2022)
  - Total: 726
  - Density: 38.5/km^{2} (99.8/sq mi)
- Time zone: UTC+1 (CET)
  - Summer (DST): UTC+2 (CEST)
- Postal code: 7757
- Area code: 69
- Geocode: 05403
- Website: www.babarc.hu

Babarc (German: Bawarz; Croatian: Babrac) is a village and municipality (Hungarian: község) in Baranya county, Hungary. Until the end of World War II, the inhabitants were Danube Swabians, also called locally as Stifolder, because their ancestors were from Fulda (district). Most of the former German settlers were expelled to Germany and Austria in 1945–1948, as a result of the Potsdam Agreement. Only a few Germans of Hungary live there, the majority today are the descendants of Hungarians from the Czechoslovak–Hungarian population exchange. They occupied the houses of the former Danube Swabian inhabitants.

== Geography ==
Babarc is located in the eastern part of Baranya County, ten kilometers from the Danube and about 30 kilometers from the borders of Croatia and Serbia. The highest point is Solomon Hill (Hungarian: Salamon-hegy) (224 m). The municipality lies within the Southern Transdanubia Region of Hungary. It previously was part of the Mohács Subregion but during the creation of districts in 2013, it became part of Bóly District.

== Demographics ==
During the census of 2011, the population was 768. The vast majority of the population claimed Hungarian ethnicity (88.7%), though 35.9% also claimed German ethnicity and the municipality has a German local minority self-government. Other ethnicities included Roma (6.3%) and Croatian (1.9%). 10.1% did not wish to answer. In terms of religious practice, 67.2% reported to be Roman Catholic, 6.7% Calvinist, 1.7% Lutheran, 3.6% of no religious affiliation and 20% did not wish to answer.

== Transport ==
The closest railway station is in Mohács, 14 kilometers to the east. The village lies near the junction of motorways M6 and M60, both of which opened in the area in 2010 and currently provide links north to Budapest and west to Pécs, and will eventually provide links to the Croatian border at Ivándárda and Barcs.
