= Nagybudmér =

Nagybudmér Großbudmer
- Municipality
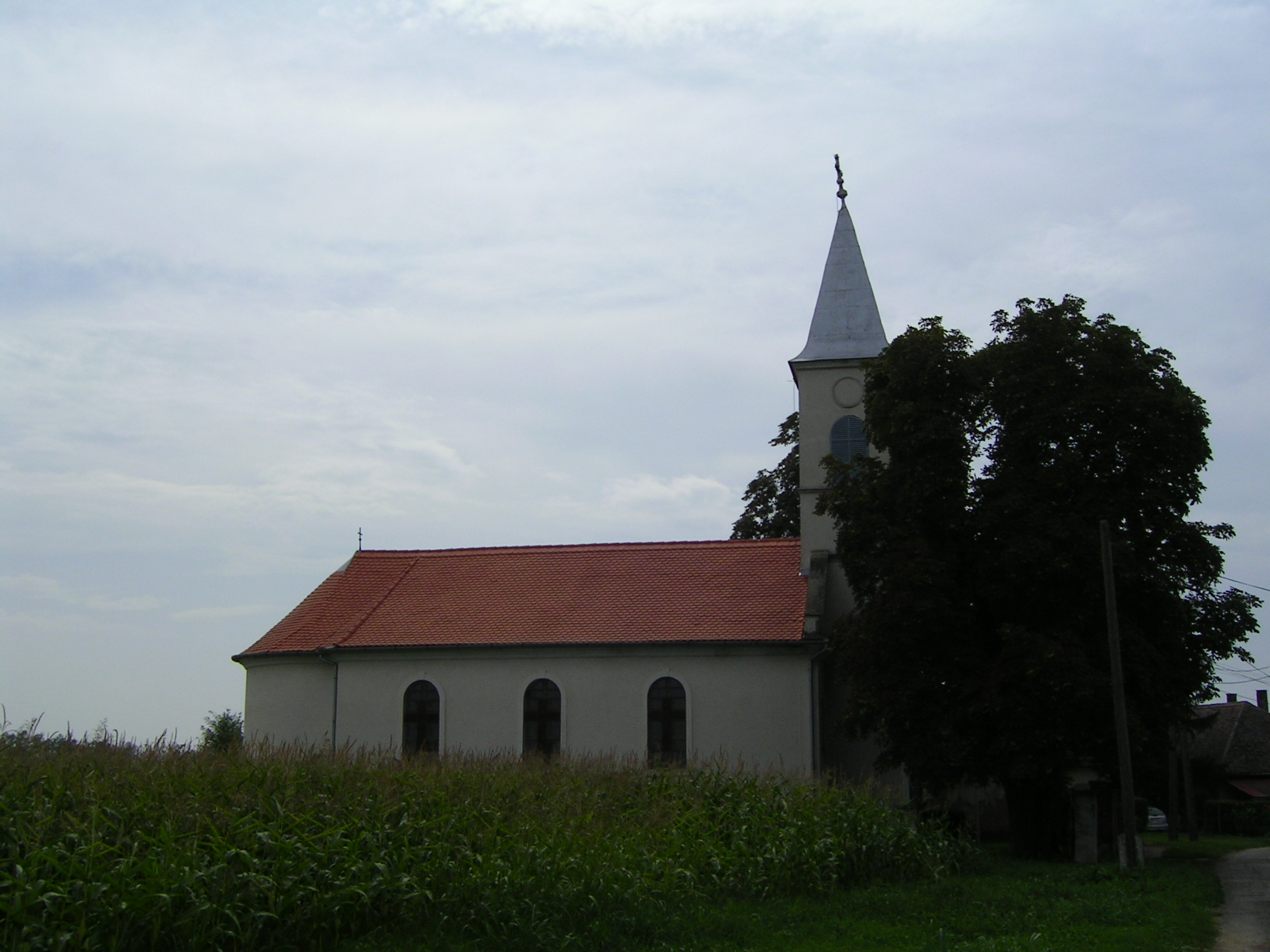

- Coat of arms

- Location within Hungary.
- Coordinates: 45°56′12″N 18°26′37″E
- Country: Hungary
- Region: Southern Transdanubia
- County: Baranya
- District: Bóly

Government
  - Type: Mayor-council government
  - Mayor: Ferenc Tetz (Ind.)

Area
  - Total: 10.22 km^{2} (3.95 sq mi)

Population (2018)
  - Total: 159
  - Density: 15.6/km^{2} (40.3/sq mi)
- Time zone: UTC+1 (CET)
  - Summer (DST): UTC+2 (CEST)
- Postal code: 7756
- Area code: 69
- Geocode: 03984

Nagybudmér (German: Großbudmer; Croatian: Veliki Budmir) is a village and municipality (Hungarian: község) in Baranya County, Hungary. Residents are Magyars, with minority of Germans.

== Geography ==
Nagybudmér is located in east central Baranya County, about halfway between the towns of Bóly and Villány. It is about 15 kilometres (9.3 mi) west of the Danube, 15 kilometres (9.3 mi) from Croatia and 50 kilometres (31 mi) from Serbia. The municipality lies within the Southern Transdanubia Region of Hungary. It previously was part of the Mohács Subregion but during the creation of districts in 2013, it became part of Bóly District.

== Demographics ==
During the census of 2011, the population was 188. The vast majority of the population claimed Hungarian ethnicity (91.2%), though 19.7% also claimed German ethnicity and the municipality has a German local minority self-government. Other ethnicities included Roma (4.1%). 7.8% did not wish to answer. In terms of religious practice, 64.8% reported to be Roman Catholic, 4.1% Calvinist, 1% Other, 4.7% of no religious affiliation and 24.9% did not wish to answer.

== Transport ==
The closest railway station is in Villány, 13 kilometres (8.1 mi) to the south.

== Points of Interest ==
- St. Martin's Church, built in 1908.
