= Belvárdgyula =

- Municipality
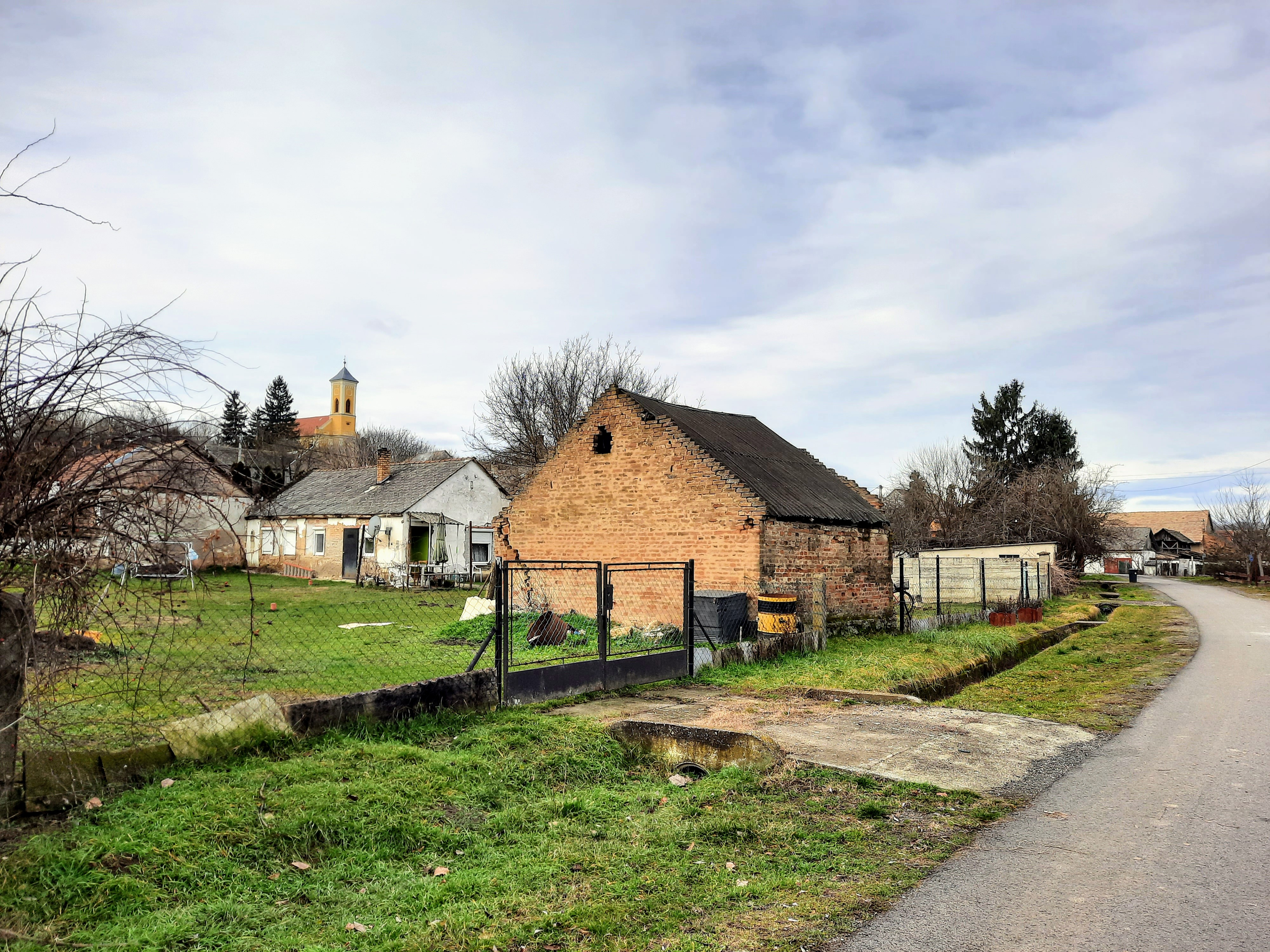

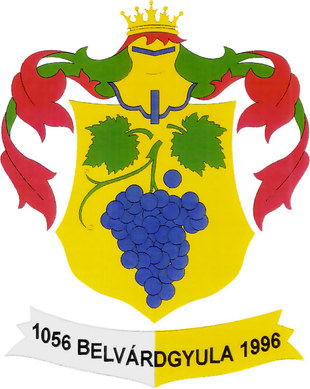
- Coat of arms

- Location within Hungary.
- Coordinates: 45°58′27″N 18°25′50″E
- Country: Hungary
- Region: Southern Transdanubia
- County: Baranya
- District: Bóly

Government
  - Type: Mayor-council government
  - Mayor: Ágnes Sándor (Ind.)

Area
  - Total: 17.23 km^{2} (6.65 sq mi)

Population (2022)
  - Total: 366
  - Density: 21.2/km^{2} (55.0/sq mi)
- Time zone: UTC+1 (CET)
  - Summer (DST): UTC+2 (CEST)
- Postal code: 7747
- Area code: 69
- Geocode: 19008

Belvárdgyula (Croatian: Belvar, German: Belward) is a village and municipality (Hungarian: község) in Baranya county, Hungary.

== Geography ==
Belvárdgyula is located in Baranya County, about six kilometers west of Bóly and 20 kilometers southeast of Pécs. It is about 20 kilometers west of the Danube, 30 kilometers from Croatia and 50 kilometers from Serbia. The municipality lies within the Southern Transdanubia Region of Hungary. It previously was part of the Mohács Subregion but during the creation of districts in 2013, it became part of Bóly District.

== Demographics ==
During the census of 2011, the population was 422. The vast majority of the population claimed Hungarian ethnicity (99%), though 18.7% also claimed Roma ethnicity and the municipality has a Roma local minority self-government. Other ethnicities included German (1.9%) and Croatian (1.5%). 1% did not wish to answer. In terms of religious practice, 55.8% reported to be Roman Catholic, 14.3% Calvinist, 16% of no religious affiliation and 13.1% did not wish to answer.

== Transport ==
The closest railway station is in Pécs, 25 kilometers to the northwest. The village lies near the M60 motorway, which opened in the area in 2010 and currently provides links west to Pécs and north to Budapest (via the M6 motorway), and will eventually provide links to the Croatian border at Ivándárda and Barcs.
