= Gábor Rekettye =

Hungarian marketing author and professor (born 1944)

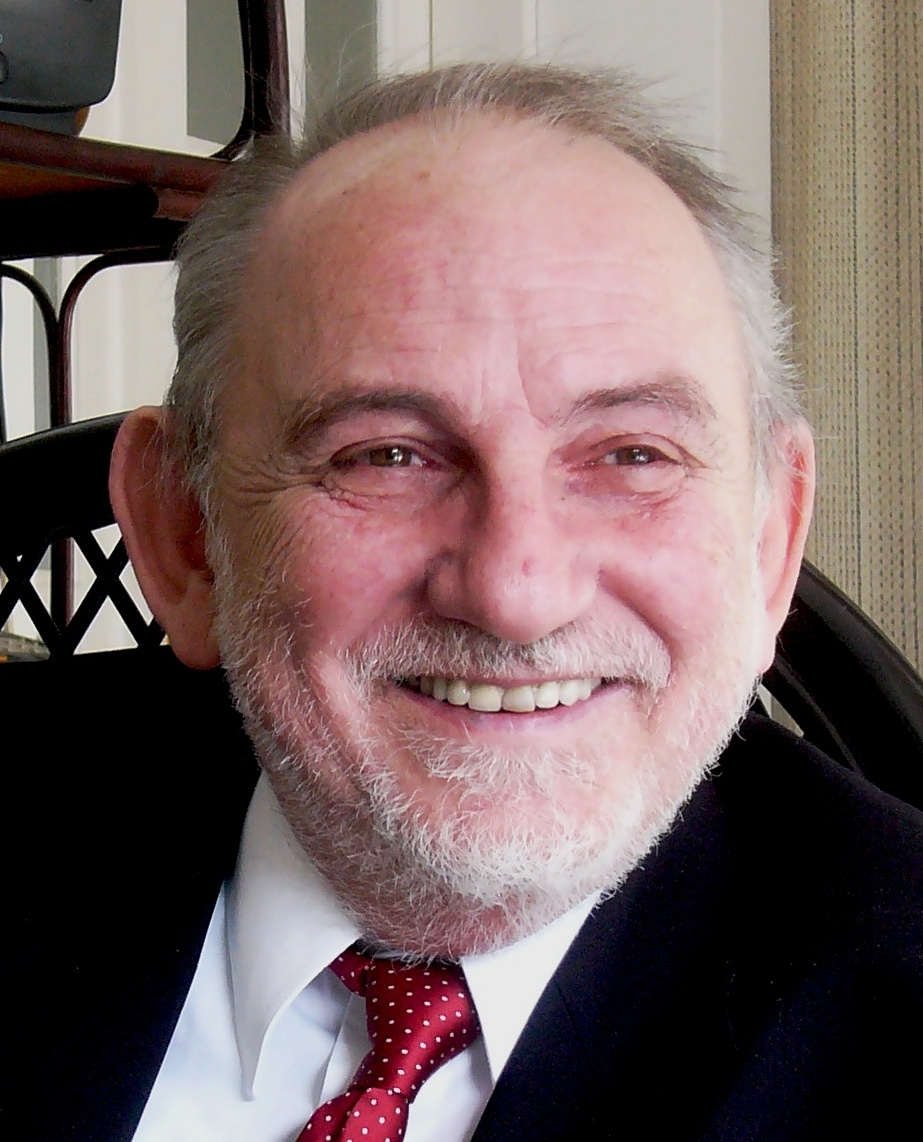
- Born: 12 July 1944 (age 82); Villány, Kingdom of Hungary

Academic background
- Education: Karl Marx University of Economic Sciences

Academic work
- Discipline: Economist

Gábor Rekettye (born July 12, 1944) is a Hungarian marketing author and professor. At present he is a professor emeritus at the University of Pécs and honorary professor at the University of Szeged.

== Early life and career ==
Until the age of 10 he lived in Villány, then he moved with his parents to Pécs. He finished the first cohort of German language at the Klára Leöwey High School in Pécs, then he went to Karl Marx University of Economic Sciences in Budapest, where he received an MSc diploma in economics. He was the first in his family who attended any form of higher education, his parents also urged him to study foreign languages. After graduating, he returned to Pécs and became the sales manager of the famous Pécs Glove Factory, where he worked between 1967 and 1973. Then he became an assistant professor at the University of Pécs where he worked for 5 years. In 1978 he moved with his family to Budapest, where he became the deputy general manager of a big foreign trading company, Tannimpex. Between 1984 and 1989 he served as commercial counsellor and as a head of the Hungarian Trade Mission in Tokyo, Japan. When he returned home in 1989, he went back to the University of Pécs, where he became associate professor. After returning home, he attended a general management programme at Harvard Business School in 1992 and the CEETP programme at the Kellogg Graduate School of Management in 1993. He became full professor in 1995. He served as a dean of the Faculty of Business and Economics at the University of Pécs between 1993 and 1996. He has been teaching as a visiting professor in different countries such as the US or the UK.

== Scientific degrees, titles ==
- PhD at the Hungarian Academy of Sciences (HAS) 1984
- Doctor Habil, Janus Pannonius University, Pécs, 1994
- Doctor of the HAS, Budapest, 2003

== Languages ==
- Hungarian (native speaker)
- English (full working proficiency)
- German (limited working proficiency)

== Awards ==
- Award of Excellence by HAS (1977 and 2009)
- Order of Merit of Hungary for excellent work, awarded by the Hungarian Minister of Economy, 1983
- Winner of Case Competition (SEEMAN, Prague, 1997 and MATCH, Budapest-Indiana, 1999)
- Award of Excellence, University of Pécs (2001 and 2003)
- Best Hungarian Marketing Publication of the Year (1997, 2014, 2015 and 2018)
- Order of Merit of Hungary, Officer's Cross awarded by the President of Hungary in 2013

== Subjects taught ==
- Foundation Marketing
- International Marketing
- Marketing and Sales
- Product Policy
- Marketing Management
- New Product Policy
- Global Marketing

== Works ==
=== Most important books ===
- Value Creation in Marketing (Together with Professor Gupta from Ohio University in Hungarian), 1997 and 1999
- The Significance of the Last Decade (In English), 2000
- Pricing in Marketing (In Hungarian), 1999, 2003 and 2004
- Marketing Theory and Practice (Both in English and Hungarian, together with 3 co-authors), 2004
- Decision Oriented Marketing (Both in English and Hungarian together with 3 co-authors), 2005
- Small Business Marketing (In Hungarian), 2007 and 2008
- Multidimensional Pricing (In Hungarian), 2011
- Marketing for the Hungarian Small Businesses (In Hungarian), 2012
- International Marketing (Together with János Fojtik in Hungarian), 2003 and 2009
- Introduction to Marketing (In Hungarian with 2 co-authors), 2015
- International Marketing (Together with Tamás Tóth and Erzsébet Malota in Hungarian), 2015
- Value Creation 4.0 (In Hungarian), 2018
- Pricing the New Frontier (Together with Professor Jonathan Liu in English), Transnational Press London, 2018
- Value Creation 4.0 - Marketing Products in the 21st Century, Transnational Press London, 2019
- From Villány to Tokyo - The adventurous life of a foreign trader-diplomat-university professor (In Hungarian), Ad Librum, Budapest, 2020
- From Villány to Tokyo, Transnational Press London, 2021
- Modern Pricing (Modern árazás – together with Pál Danyi and István Veres), Akadémiai Kiadó Budapest, 2021
- An Introduction to Marketing, second edition (Coauthors: Mária Törőcsik and Erzsébet Hetesi) Budapest: Akadémiai Kiadó, 2023, 396 p. (in Hungarian)é
- Sme-Marketing – Everything that smaller businesses should know about marketing (in Hungarian), Budapest: Akadémiai Kiadó, 2024, 285 p.
- Pricing for Strategic Managers – the Theory and Practice of Implementing Pricing Decisions” (Coauthors: Jonathan Liu and Pál Danyi) Palgrave Macmillan, Springer Nature, Cham, Switzerland, 2025, 331 p.

== Social activities ==
- Chairman of the Hungary-Japan Economic Club (1989–2001)
- Chairman of the Hungarian Association of Marketing Educators (1993–1998)
- Chairman of the Scientific Committee of Marketing at the HAS (2005–2011)
- Member of the Editorial Board of Different International Journals
- Chairman of the Editorial Board of the Hungarian Journal of Marketing and Management (1995-)
