= Monyoród =

Monyoród Minjorod
- Municipality
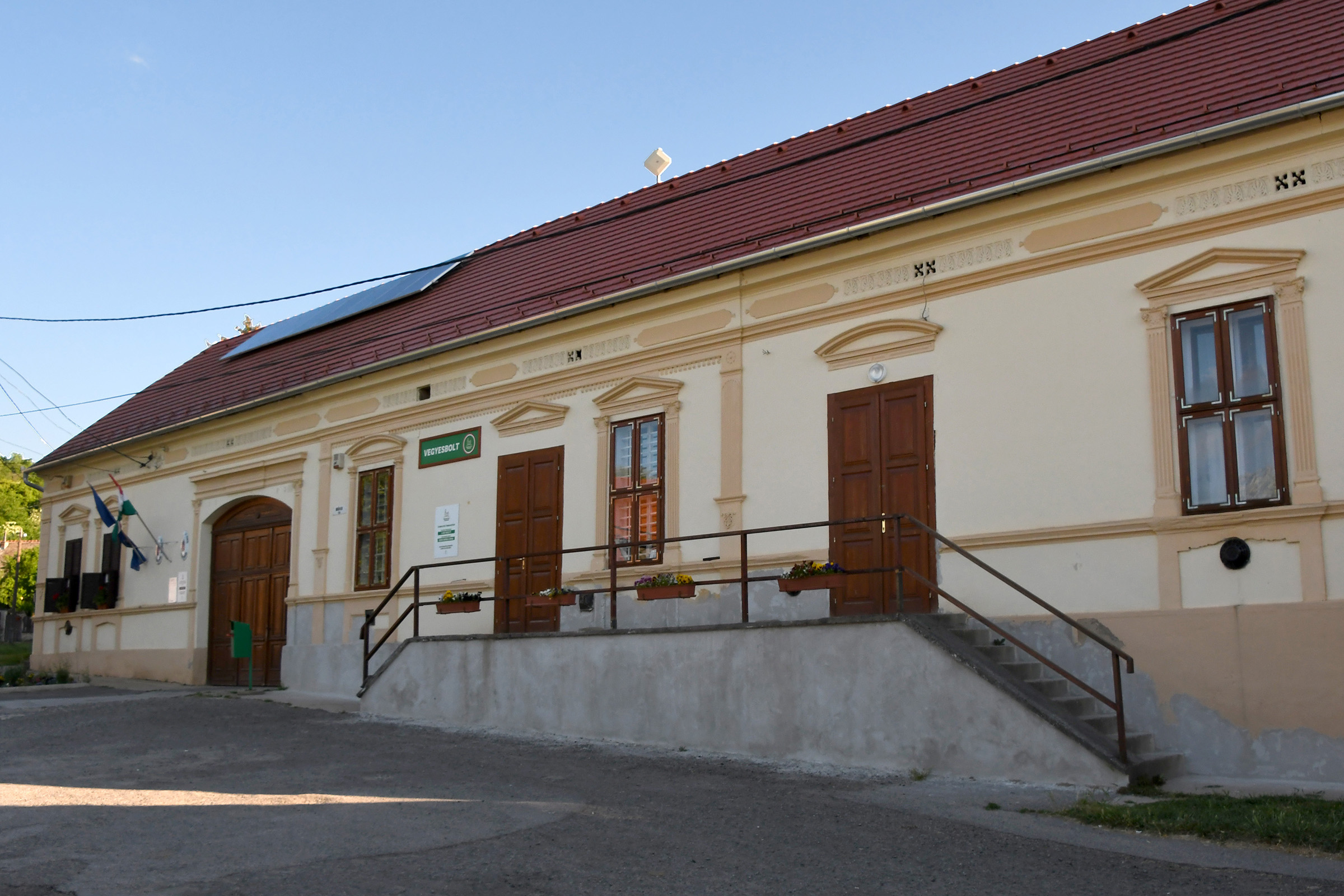

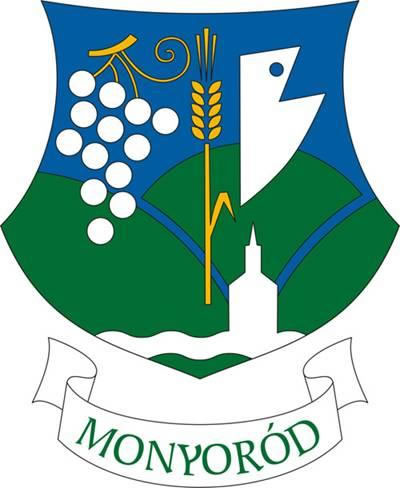
- Coat of arms

- Location within Hungary.
- Coordinates: 46°0′28.22″N 18°28′48.94″E
- Country: Hungary
- Region: Southern Transdanubia
- County: Baranya
- District: Bóly

Government
  - Type: Mayor-council government
  - Mayor: György Horváth (Ind.)

Area
  - Total: 7.12 km^{2} (2.75 sq mi)

Population (2018)
  - Total: 136
  - Density: 19.1/km^{2} (49.5/sq mi)
- Time zone: UTC+1 (CET)
  - Summer (DST): UTC+2 (CEST)
- Postal code: 7751
- Area code: 69
- Geocode: 16027

Monyoród (Croatian: Minjorod; German: Munjerod) is a village and municipality (Hungarian: község) in Baranya County, Hungary. Until the end of World War II, the majority of the inhabitants was Danube Swabian, also called locally as Stifolder, because their ancestors arrived in the 17th and 18th centuries from Fulda (district). Most of the former German settlers were expelled to allied-occupied Germany and allied-occupied Austria in 1945–1948, as a result of the Potsdam Agreement. Only a few Germans of Hungary live there, the majority today are the descendants of Hungarians from the Czechoslovak–Hungarian population exchange. They occupied the houses of the former Danube Swabian inhabitants.

== Geography ==
Monyoród is located in east central Baranya County, about halfway between Pécs and Mohács, and 10 kilometers north of Bóly. The municipality lies within the Southern Transdanubia Region of Hungary. It previously was part of the Mohács Subregion but during the creation of districts in 2013, it became part of Bóly District.

== Demographics ==
During the census of 2011, the population was 163. The majority of the population claimed Hungarian ethnicity (64.9%). Other ethnicities claimed included German (14.9%), Croatian (8.4%), Roma (1.3%) and Romanian (1.3%). 33.1% did not wish to answer. In terms of religious practice, 45.5% reported to be Roman Catholic, 7.1% Calvinist, 8.4% of no religious affiliation and 39% did not wish to answer.

== Transport ==
The closest railway station is in Bóly, 10 kilometers to the south.
