= Villány Mountains =

Mountain range in Hungary

Coordinates: 45°53′N 18°21′E

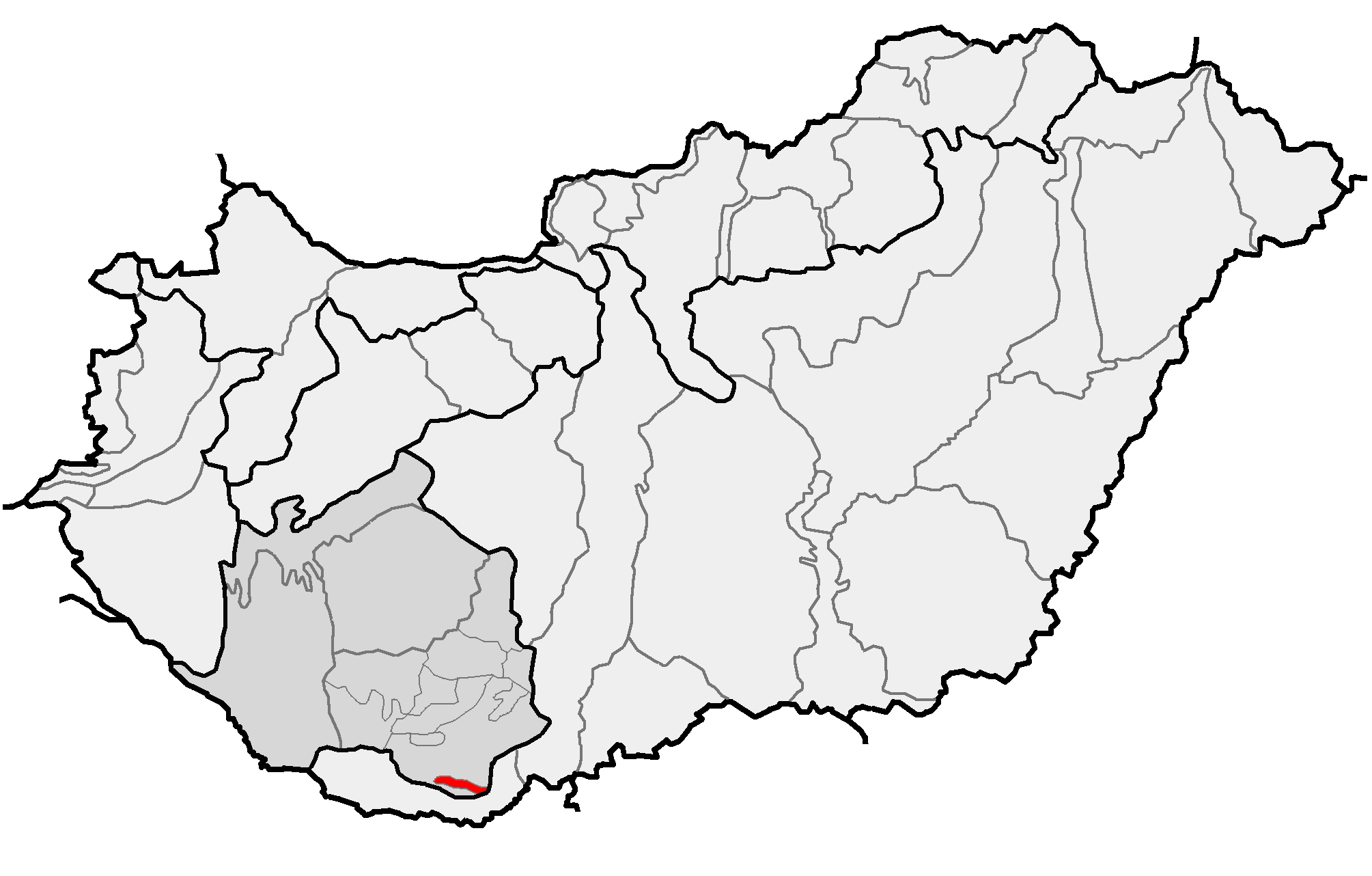
Villány Mountains (in red) within physical subdivisions of Hungary

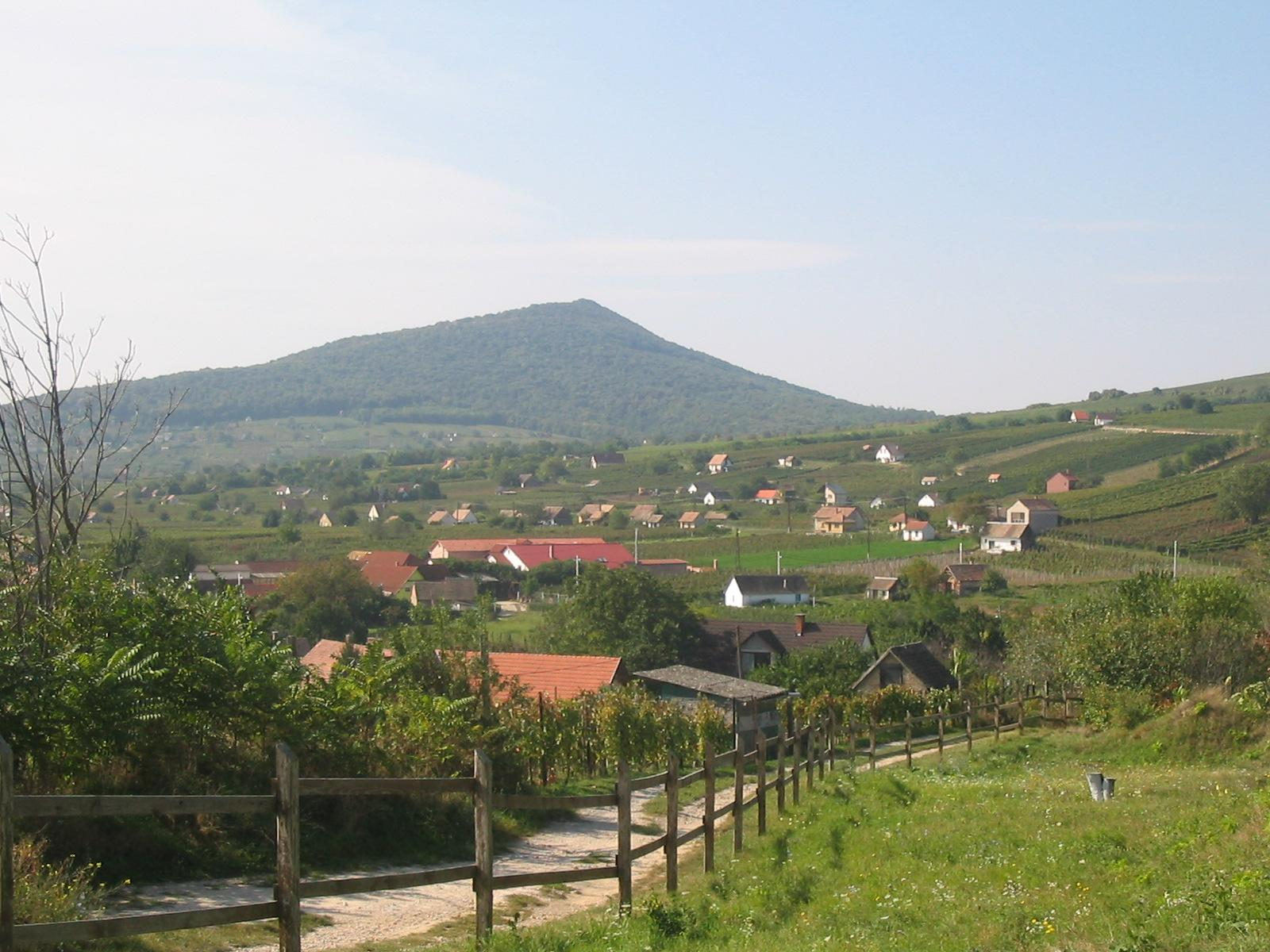
The view of the Szársomlyó from Baranya Hills. Villány is on the left.

Villány Mountains (Hungarian: Villányi-hegység Hungarian: [ˈvillaːɲ]) is a relatively low mountain range located west from the town of Villány, in Baranya county, Southern Hungary.

Its highest summit, the Szársomlyó is 442 metres high. The latter has an extraordinary flora: on its southern slopes, the climate is Mediterranean; the percentage rate of mediterranean species is over 20%. As of 2004, 44 Orthoptera species were described in the area, including 21 Ensifera and 23 Caelifera. On the top, the ruins of a medieval castle can be found. The territory is part of the Danube-Drava National Park.

The range is made up of limestone, dating from the Triassic to Cretaceous periods of the Mesozoic Era. In the 20th century, the 850 meter long Beremend Crystal Cave and 1500 meter long Nagyharsány Crystal Cave were discovered during stone mining.

== See also ==
- Geography of Hungary
- Transdanubia
