= Szederkény =

Szederkény Surgetin
- Village (Falva)
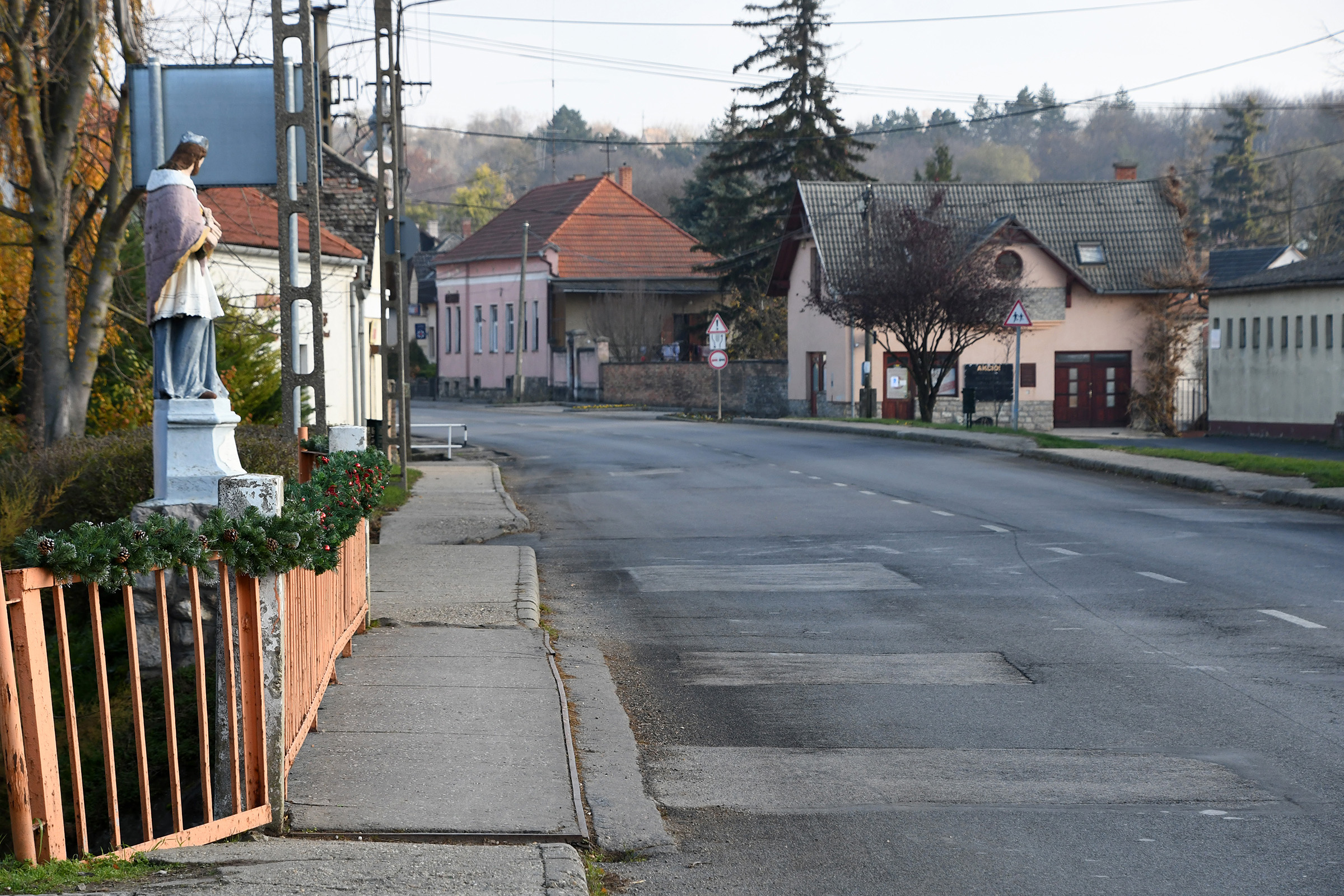
- Interactive map of Szederkény
- Coordinates: 46°00′N 18°27′E
- Country: Hungary
- County: Baranya

Population (2025)
  - Total: 1,650
- Time zone: UTC+1 (CET)
  - Summer (DST): UTC+2 (CEST)

Szederkény (German: Surgetin) is a village in Baranya County, Hungary.
