= Versend =

Versend Vršenda, Werschend
- Village (Falva)
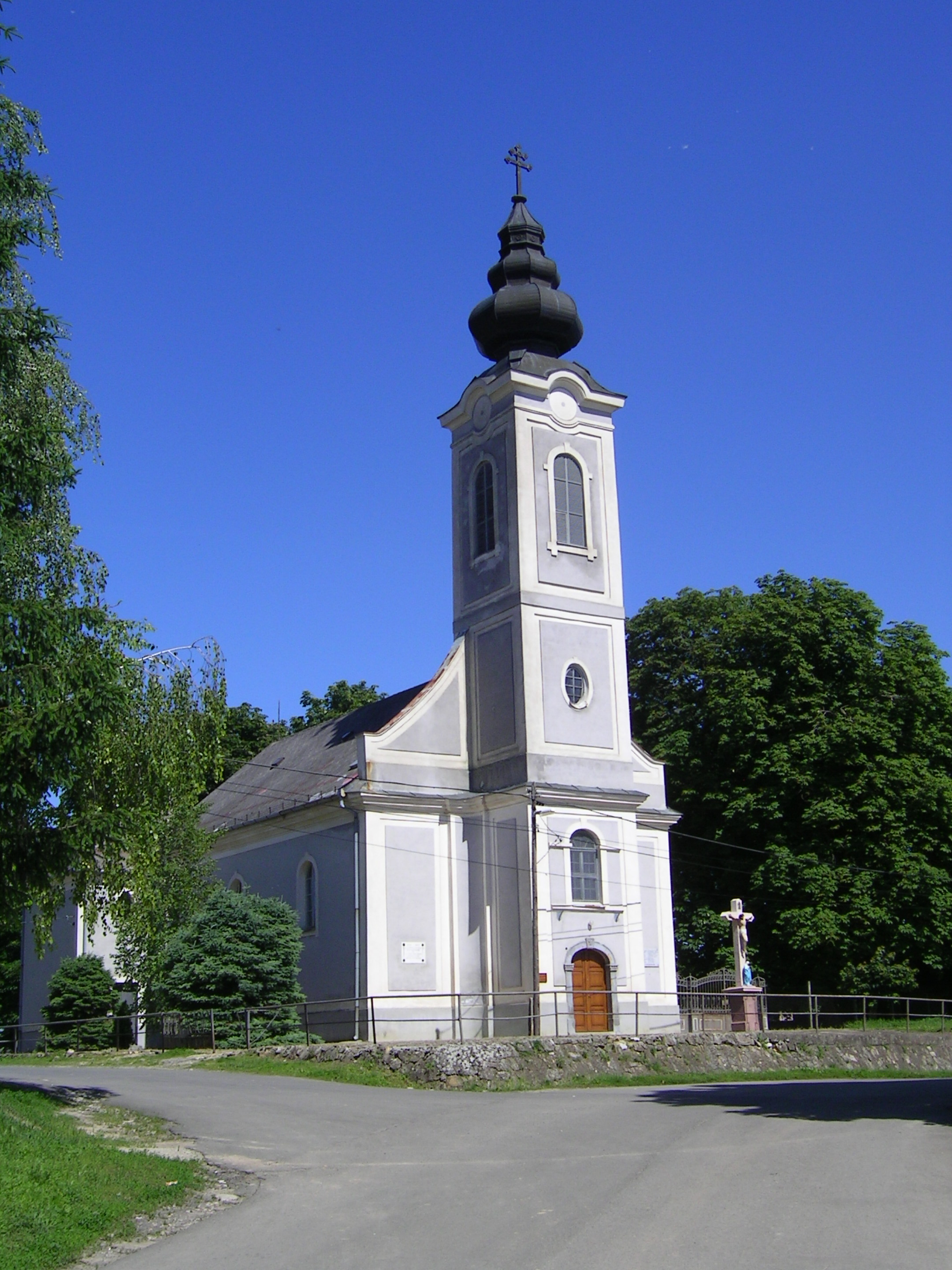

- Location of Baranya county in Hungary

- Location of Versend
- Coordinates: 45.99617°N 18.51318°E
- Country: Hungary
- County: Baranya

Area
  - Total: 14.13 km^{2} (5.46 sq mi)

Population (2004)
  - Total: 980
  - Density: 69.35/km^{2} (179.6/sq mi)
- Time zone: UTC+1 (CET)
  - Summer (DST): UTC+2 (CEST)
- Postal code: 7752
- Area code: 69

Versend (Croatian: Vršenda; German: Werschend) is a village in Baranya County, Hungary.
