= Szajk =

- Village (Falva)
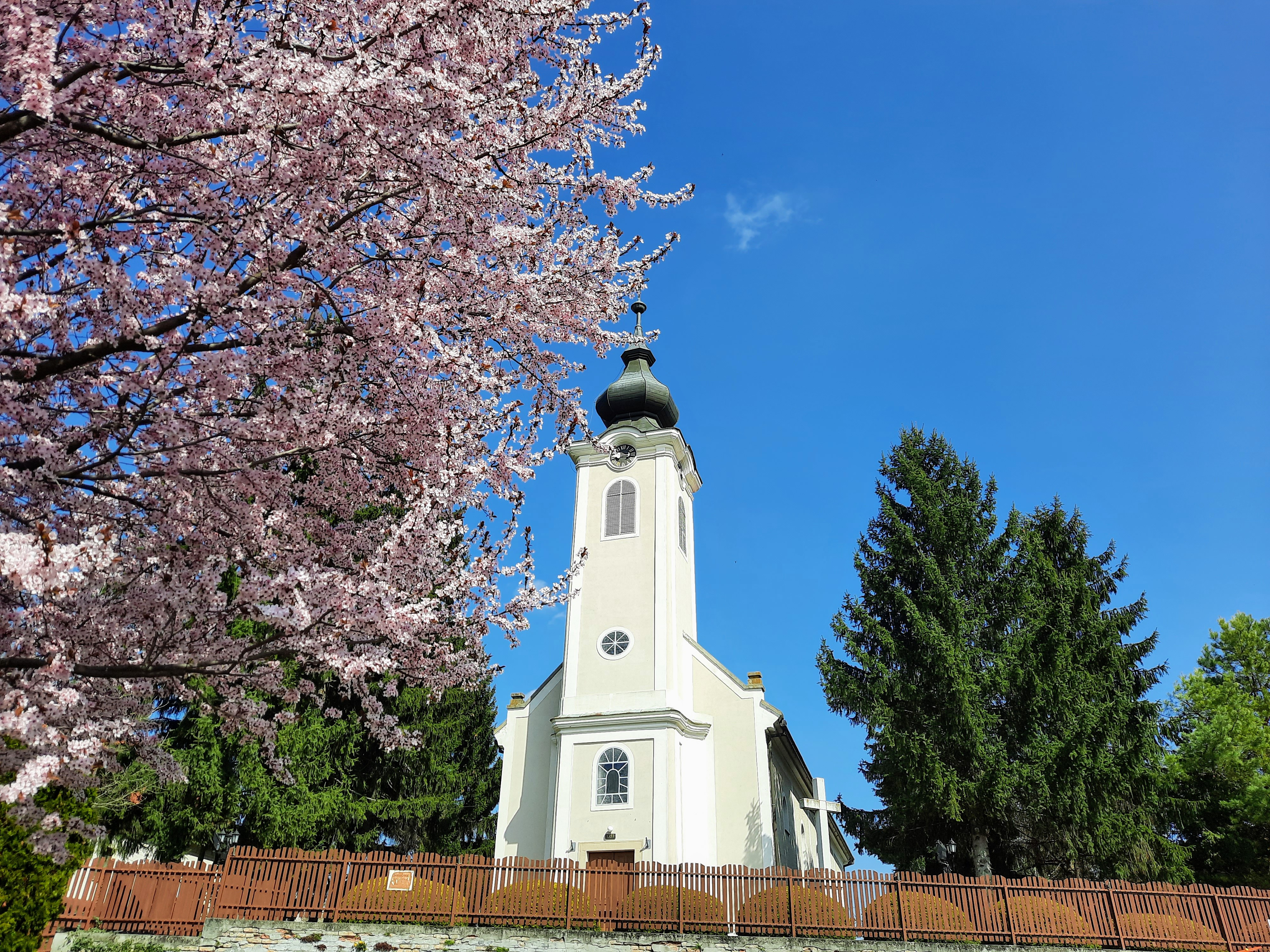

- Location of Baranya county in Hungary

- Location of Szajk
- Coordinates: 45.99169°N 18.53461°E
- Country: Hungary
- County: Baranya

Area
  - Total: 11.4 km^{2} (4.4 sq mi)

Population (2004)
  - Total: 803
  - Density: 70.43/km^{2} (182.4/sq mi)
- Time zone: UTC+1 (CET)
  - Summer (DST): UTC+2 (CEST)
- Postal code: 7753
- Area code: 69

Szajk (Croatian: Sajka) is a village in Baranya county, Hungary.
