= Villány =

Villány Wieland
- Town
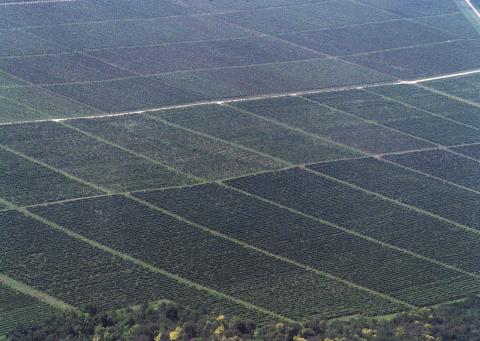
- Villány: the wine region

- Flag Coat of arms

- Location of Villány
- Coordinates: 45.86951°N 18.45562°E
- Country: Hungary
- County: Baranya
- District: Siklós

Area
  - Total: 22.02 km^{2} (8.50 sq mi)

Population (2008)
  - Total: 2,517
  - Density: 114.3/km^{2} (296/sq mi)
- Time zone: UTC+1 (CET)
  - Summer (DST): UTC+2 (CEST)
- Postal code: 7773
- Area code: (+36) 72
- Website: www.villany.hu

Villány (German: Wieland; Croatian: Viljan, Biljan or Vilanje; Serbian: Виљан, romanized: Viljan) is a town in Baranya County, Hungary that is famous for its wine. Residents are Hungarians, with a minority of Croats, Serbs and Germans of Hungary. Until the end of World War II, the inhabitants were Danube Swabians, also called locally as Stifolder, because their ancestors arrived around 1720 from Fulda (district). Most of the former German settlers were expelled to Allied-occupied Germany and Allied-occupied Austria in 1945–1948, pursuant to the Potsdam Agreement. Only a few Germans of Hungary live there, the majority today are descendant of Hungarians from the Czechoslovak–Hungarian population exchange. They received the houses of the former Danube Swabians inhabitants.

== Etymology ==
The name derives from the Hungarian word for lightning, villám. Formerly (centuries ago), the settlement was recorded under this form of name.

== History ==
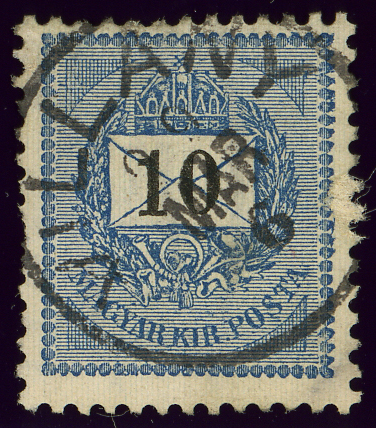
Cancelled in 1900 in the Kingdom of Hungary

After the Ottoman occupation until 1918, VILLÁNY was part of the Austrian monarchy, province of Hungary; in Transleithania after the compromise of 1867 in the Kingdom of Hungary. A post-office was opened end of 1867 (depending on from Oedenburg Post Directorate).

== Geography ==
The city is located in the encounter of three large geographical regions: the Great Hungarian Plain from the south, Baranya Hills from the north, and finally Villány Mountains border it from the west. On the plain, agricultural activity is common. The mountains and the hills provide a suitable place for wine producing.

A fossil site known as "Villány locality 6" or "Villány-Kalkberg Süd" has yielded many vertebrate fossils from Lower Pleistocene.

== Demographics ==
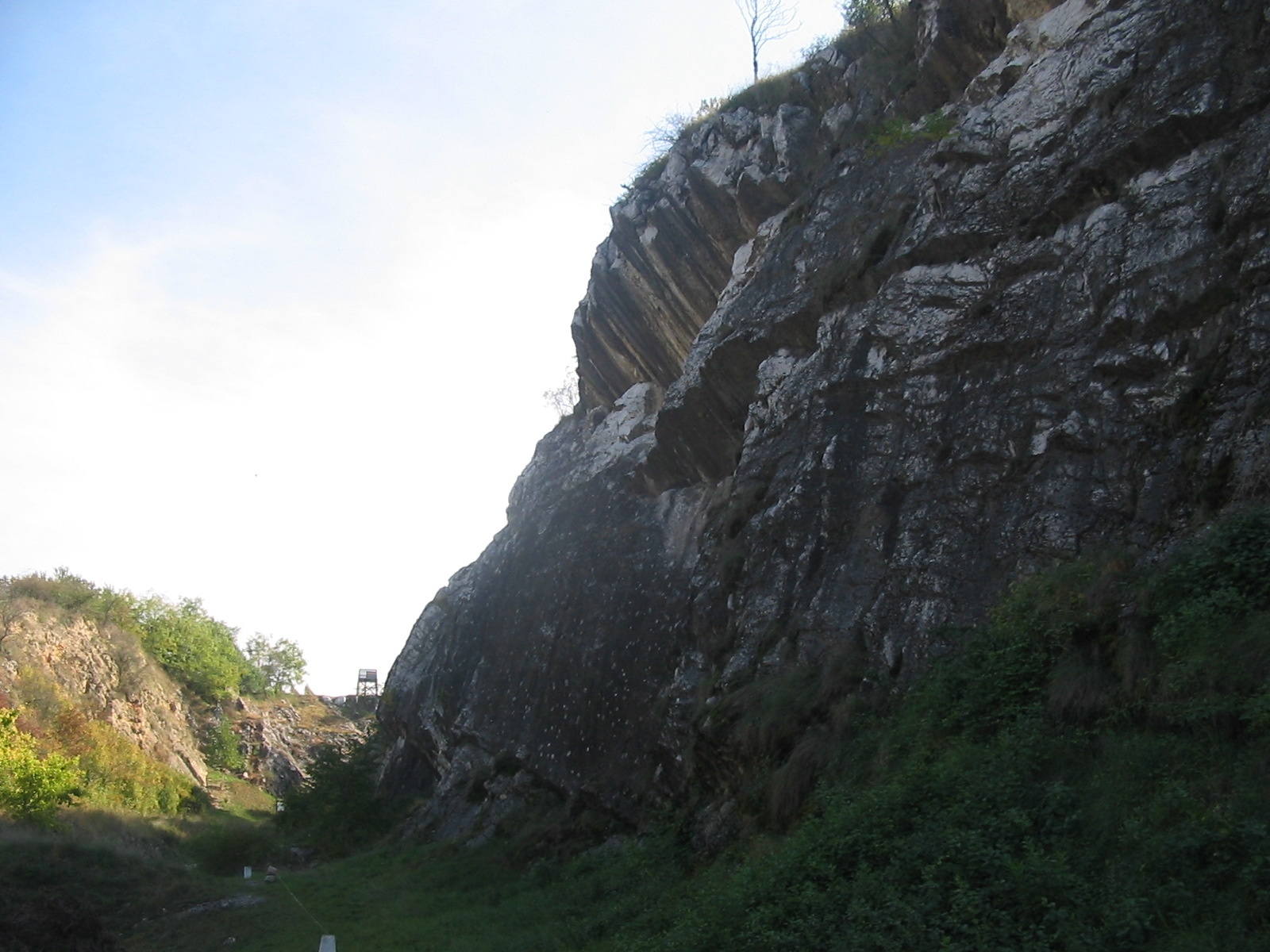
A scene in Villány Mountains

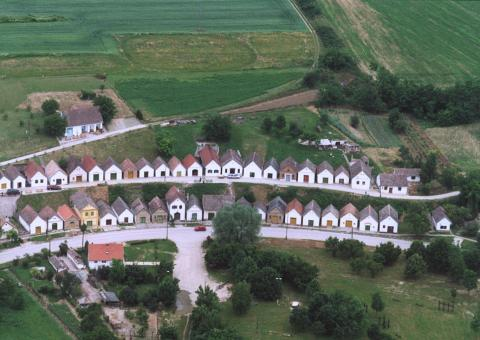
Winehouses of Villány

The settlement's population, divided to age groups:

| Group | 2006 |
| 0–5 years old | 108 |
| 6–13 years old | 204 |
| 14–17 years old | 143 |
| 18–54 years old | 1450 |
| 55–69 years old | 328 |
| over 70 | 404 |

== Twin towns – sister cities ==
Villány is twinned with:

- Eislingen, Germany
- Stainz, Austria
- Vețca, Romania
- Zamárdi, Hungary

== Wine region ==
Villány is one of Hungary's most prominent red wine regions. The southernmost wine region has the highest number of sunshine hours. Hungary's climate is continental. However, the Villány wine region is characterized by its sub-Mediterranean climate because of its location. The region is known for producing full-bodied Bordeaux-style red wine blends. French varieties Cabernet Sauvignon, Cabernet Franc, Merlot had a great time here. There is also Portugieser, Kékfrankos, but we can also meet Kadarka and Syrah grapes. White grapes are also cultivated by winemakers such as Italian Riesling, Chardonnay, Sauvignon Blanc and Green Veltelini.
