= Czechoslovak–Hungarian population exchange =

Forced migration

The Czechoslovak–Hungarian population exchange was the exchange of inhabitants between Czechoslovakia and Hungary after World War II. Between 45,000 and 120,000 Hungarians were forcibly transferred from Czechoslovakia to Hungary, and their properties confiscated, while around 72,000 Slovaks voluntarily transferred from Hungary to Czechoslovakia.

== Post-war Czechoslovakia ==
"After this war there will be no minority rights in the spirit of the old system which began after the First World War. After punishing all the delinquents who committed crimes against the state, the overwhelming majority of the Germans and Hungarians must leave Czechoslovakia. This is our resolute standpoint ... Our people cannot live with the Germans and Hungarians in our fatherland."

— Edvard Beneš's opinion about the Košice Government Program

In 1945, at the end of World War II, Czechoslovakia was recreated and Czechoslovak politicians aimed to completely remove the German and Hungarian minorities from their territory through ethnic cleansing. (Note: Ethnic cleansing is a term that has come to be used broadly to describe all activities designed to force the removal of specific ethnicities from specific territories.(Carmichael, Cathie (2002). Ethnic cleansing in the Balkans: nationalism and the destruction of tradition (Illustrated ed.). Routledge. p. 2. ISBN 978-0-415-27416-6.)) Both minorities were considered collectively as "war criminals", based on the actions of some individuals, such as Konrad Henlein, and the participation of their countries in the dismemberment of Czechoslovakia through the Munich Agreement and the First and Second Vienna Awards.

During the last years of the war, Edvard Beneš, the leader of the Czechoslovak government-in-exile, worked toward resolving the minority problem of Czechoslovakia through the transfer or assimilation of these minorities, as he considered them the biggest obstacle in the way of re-shaping postwar Czechoslovakia into a nation-state. The idea that the Hungarian minority in Slovakia must be removed dominated Czechoslovak national policy for an extended period.

Klement Gottwald, leader of the Czechoslovak communists had set up a rival Czechoslovak government in Moscow. In April 1945 Gottwald and Beneš met in Košice and together they created the new Czechoslovak government, the National Front – a mixture of Soviet-supported Communists and non-Communists – and announced the "Košický vládny program" ("Košice Government Program"). At this time, all political groups in Czechoslovakia, including the previous government-in-exile and the new government, agreed that the country should be formed into a nation state. It was in this atmosphere that the Košice Government Program – under the supervision of the Central Committee of the All-Soviet Communist Party – was created.

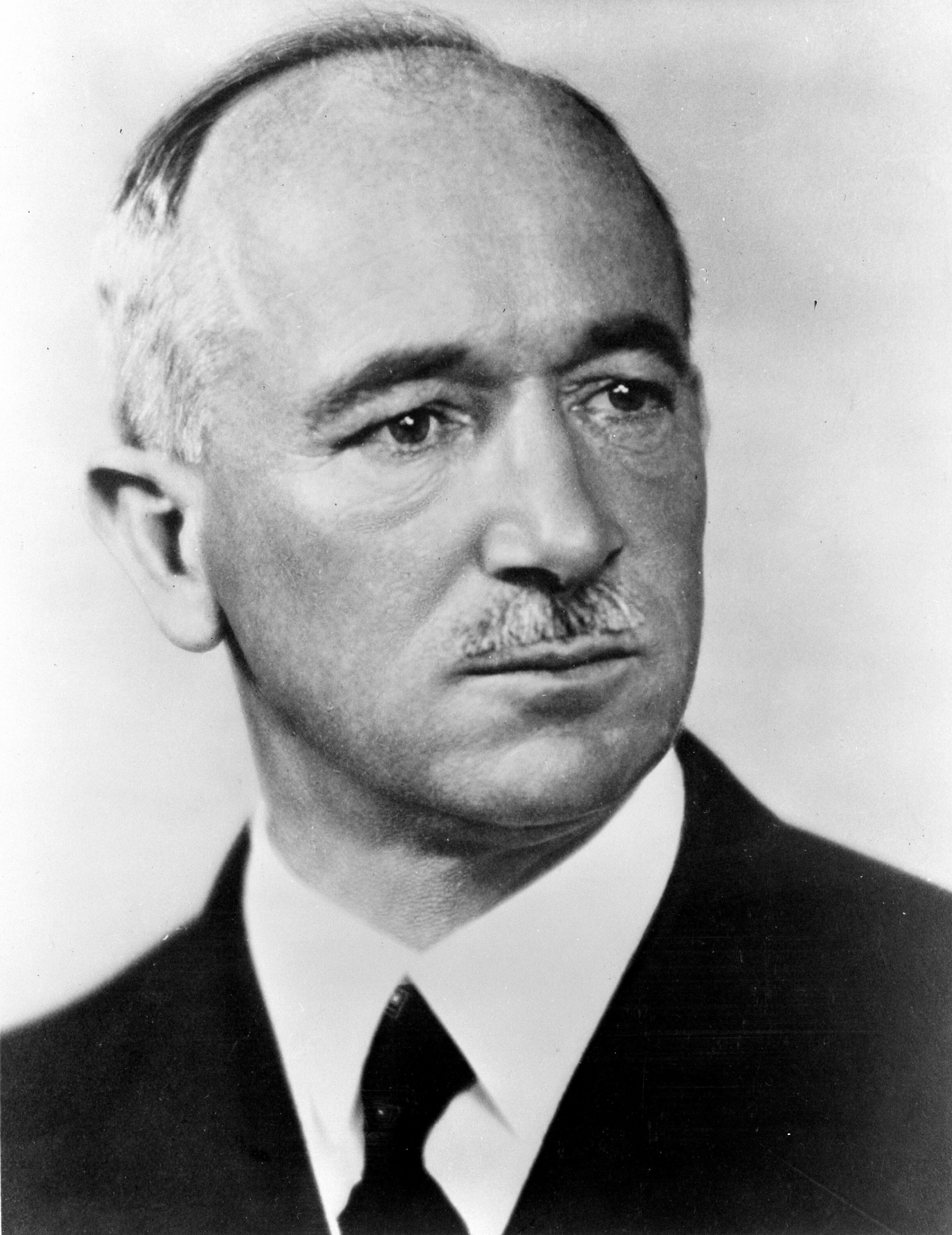
Edvard Beneš (1884–1948)

The Hungarian question is mainly dealt with in Chapters VIII, XI and XV out of the 16 chapters of the program. Chapter VIII deprived the Hungarian and German inhabitants of their citizenship. Chapter XI declared the confiscation of Hungarian landed property while chapter XV ordered to close nationality schools. From chapters VIII and IX, adopted by the cabinet council on April 5, 1945:

"As to the Czechoslovak citizens of German and Hungarian nationality, who were Czechoslovak citizens prior to the Munich Pact in 1938, their citizenship will be confirmed and their eventual return to the Republic may be permitted only in the following categories: for anti-Nazis and anti-Fascists who fought against Henlein and Hungarian irredentism, who fought for Czechoslovakia, and who after the Munich Pact and after March 15 were persecuted for their loyalty to Czechoslovakia.... The Czechoslovak citizenship of the other Czechoslovak German and Hungarian citizens will be cancelled. Although they may again express a choice for Czechoslovakia, public authorities will retain the right of individual decision."

According to the Constitution promulgated on May 9, 1948:

"We have decided now that our liberated State shall be a national state, rid of all hostile elements, living in brotherly harmony with the family of Slav States and in friendship with all peace-loving nations of the world. (§ 9) [...] The Czechoslovak Republic is a unitary State of two Slav nations possessing equal rights, the Czechs and the Slovaks." (Article II/1 )

The key parts of this policy were written by high-ranking members of the Communist Party of Czechoslovakia, such as Klement Gottwald, Bohumír Šmeral, Jan Šverma and Václav Kopecký. Gustáv Husák commented:

"The past seven tormenting years have changed our opinion and the opinion of the majority of the world on the minority politics. This is the fourth lesson we are drawing from the fall of 1938, a lesson pointing to the historic crime of the Hungarian and German minorities in the destruction of the Republic of Czechoslovakia, a lesson showing the sufferings of the population of Czechoslovakia, a lesson on the inevitability of expelling and exchanging the minority populations in the interest of the European peace and the peaceful coexistence of the nations."

Because the German and Hungarian minorities were pre-war Czechoslovak citizens, Beneš had to adopt decrees that deprived them of their citizenship. In 1945, he revoked the citizenship of Germans and Hungarians by decree #33, except those with an active anti-fascist past (see Beneš decrees), and Czechoslovakia maintained that the peace agreement must include a provision stating that

"Hungarians whose Czechoslovak citizenship will now be revoked will be recognized by Hungary as Hungarian citizens and will be settled on its territory, and Hungary will bear responsibility for these individuals from the moment they cross Hungary's border and will provide for them."

== Deportation of Hungarians ==
"When President Beneš was in Moscow, I learned from him that the Soviet government agreed to his proposals to deport approximately two-thirds of the German and Hungarian minorities from Czechoslovakia"

— A letter from A. Kerr to V.M. Molotov April 11, 1945.

The resettlement of about 700,000 Hungarians was envisaged at Kosice and subsequently reaffirmed by the National Front, however, the success of the deportation plan depended on the acquiescence of the victors in World War II. In 1943, before the end of the war, Beneš already received the necessary approval of the United States, Great Britain and the Soviet Union to transfer the German and Hungarian population out of Czechoslovakia, but at the end of the war, when the American and British leaders saw the specifics of Beneš's plan, they did not support it. The plan, however, fit well with Joseph Stalin's Central European policy, and on March 21, 1945, Vyacheslav Molotov informed Beneš that the Soviet Union would support him. Zdeněk Fierlinger informed the Czechoslovak government that "Stalin has an utterly positive standpoint on our demands in the matter of the transfer. He will allow us to carry out the transfer to Germany and Hungary, and, to a certain extent, also to Austria"

The Potsdam Agreement subsequently approved the deportation of Germans from Czechoslovakia, but the removal of the complete Hungarian population proved to be more difficult, and finally failed to be approved. The Czechoslovak government attempted to apply the Potsdam Agreement on the Hungarian population as well, but the Western powers rejected this conception, and also refused to put the Czechoslovak demands into the peace treaty with Hungary. The Hungarian government protested the planned expulsion of the Hungarian population from Czechoslovakia and requested intervention from the Allies. When the Czechoslovak government realized that they had lost the support of the Western powers, who advised and supported negotiations with Hungary, they turned to an internal solution, and decided to eliminate the Hungarian minority through Slovakization and Slovak colonization.

== Hungarian–Slovak population exchanges ==
Slovak propaganda poster encouraging Slovaks to move from Hungary to Slovakia. The text says: Slovak Brothers! Do you want to come to Slovakia, your native land? Do you want to settle down and live among your fellow brothers? Do you want to work on your own land? Do you want your children to go to Slovak schools? Do you want to be citizens of the victorious Czechoslovak state? Do you want to occupy the lands and assets, that are prepared for you? Do you want to find good paying jobs in factories? If you do, come along, the Czechoslovak Republic is waiting for you!

"The minorities in Central Europe must be liquidated, as they have been a source of trouble and a fifth column"

— Joseph Stalin, ÚPV, govt meeting April 16, 1946, secret part

The Czechoslovak leadership pressed for the deportation of all Hungarians; however, the Allies prevented a unilateral expulsion, and instead advised them to solve the minority problem through negotiations. As a result, the Czechoslovak government resettled more than 40,000 Hungarians to the Czech borderlands, provoking a protest from the United States, and a warning from Hungary about the potential reannexation of the solidly Hungarian areas, something it had achieved in 1938 in the First Vienna Award, but which was annulled on February 10, 1947 by the Treaty of Paris. After this, Czechoslovakia pressed for a bilateral population exchange to remove Hungarians and increase its Slovak population, changing the ethnic makeup of the country. This plan was initially rejected by Hungary, however, one of the unconcealed purposes of the deportation of the Hungarians to the Czech lands was to pressure Hungary to agree. Soon, Hungary realized that the Allies are not actually much interested in the fate of the Hungarian minority, and that they would not halt the deportations; the peace treaty signed on 1947 did not include any provision concerning the protection of minorities. In these circumstances, Hungary finally signed the bilateral agreement with Czechoslovakia in Budapest, on February 27, 1946. The signatories were Vladimír Clementis, Vice-Minister of Foreign Affairs of Czechoslovakia and János Gyöngyösi, Minister of Foreign Affairs of Hungary.

The Hungarian government considered the agreement to be a major fiasco. The Czechoslovak government planned the removal of 250,000 Hungarians from South Slovakia to Hungary, but according to different estimations 45,000 or 120,000 – generally well-to-do businessmen, tradesmen, farmers and intellectuals – had been transferred under the bilateral exchange, while 71,787 or 73,200 Slovaks from Hungary – the exact number depends on source consulted – were resettled in South Slovakia. Slovaks leaving Hungary moved voluntarily, but Hungarians leaving Czechoslovakia were forcibly deported and their properties taken away. Thirty thousand Hungarians, who arrived to the country in 1938, hence were not Czechoslovak citizens before, left the territories that were re-annexed by Hungary in 1938 and then re-attached to Czechoslovakia after World War II. This was due to their being dropped from the pension, social, and healthcare system. In all, 89,660 Hungarians arrived in Hungary from Czechoslovakia between 1945 and 1948. Half of the Slovaks who registered for the exchange ultimately chose not to relocate to Czechoslovakia.

Population changes between Czechoslovakia and Hungary (1945–1948)
| Appointed for the bilateral Czechoslovak–Hungarian population transfer | Number of persons |
|---|---|
| under article V. of the contract | 105,047 (27,718 families) |
| under article VIII. of the contract | 65,200 (23,552 families) |
| De facto transferred | Number of persons |
| under article V. of the contract | 45,475 |
| as war criminals, article VIII. of the contract | 2,905 |
| "R" transport (regimists) | 1,034 |
| before the contract came into effect | 11,837 |
| from the liberation until the inauguration of the Czechoslovak administration | 10,196 |
| after the contract came into effect, but beyond from it | 11,057 |
| after the contract came into effect | 1,083 |
| from Rusovce | 73 |
| voluntarily | 6,000 |
| Total | 89,660 |

== Current views ==
In 2002 before Slovakia and Hungary joined the European Union in 2004, Hungarian politician Viktor Orbán demanded the repeal of the Beneš Decrees, but the European Parliament asserted that "the decrees did not constitute an insurmountable obstacle to accession." Slovak politician Monika Beňová-Flašiková accused the Hungarian politicians of pushing revanchist policies which could destabilize Europe. Later, the Hungarian members of the Slovak parliament requested compensation and a symbolic apology to the victims of the expulsions. As an answer, the Slovak government adopted a resolution in September 2007 declaring the Beneš Decrees inalterable.

According to The Minorities at Risk Project:

During the communist regime, Slovak nationalism was largely kept in check by the strongly centralist Prague regime. The 1968 switch to a federal arrangement gave greater scope to Slovak nationalism, however. New policies of assimilation included progressive Slovakization of education, elimination of Hungarian place-names from signs, bans on using Hungarian in administrative dealings and in institutions and workplaces, and pressure to Slovakize Hungarian names. Nonetheless, the most significant exclusionary factor in Hungarians’ social situation under the communist regime was most likely their own refusal to integrate into the Czechoslovak system and to learn the language. Without a fluency in the official language, their economic and political opportunities were severely limited.

== See also ==
- Expulsion of Germans from Czechoslovakia after World War II
- Potsdam Conference of 1945
- South Tyrol Option Agreement
