= Ivándárda =

- Village
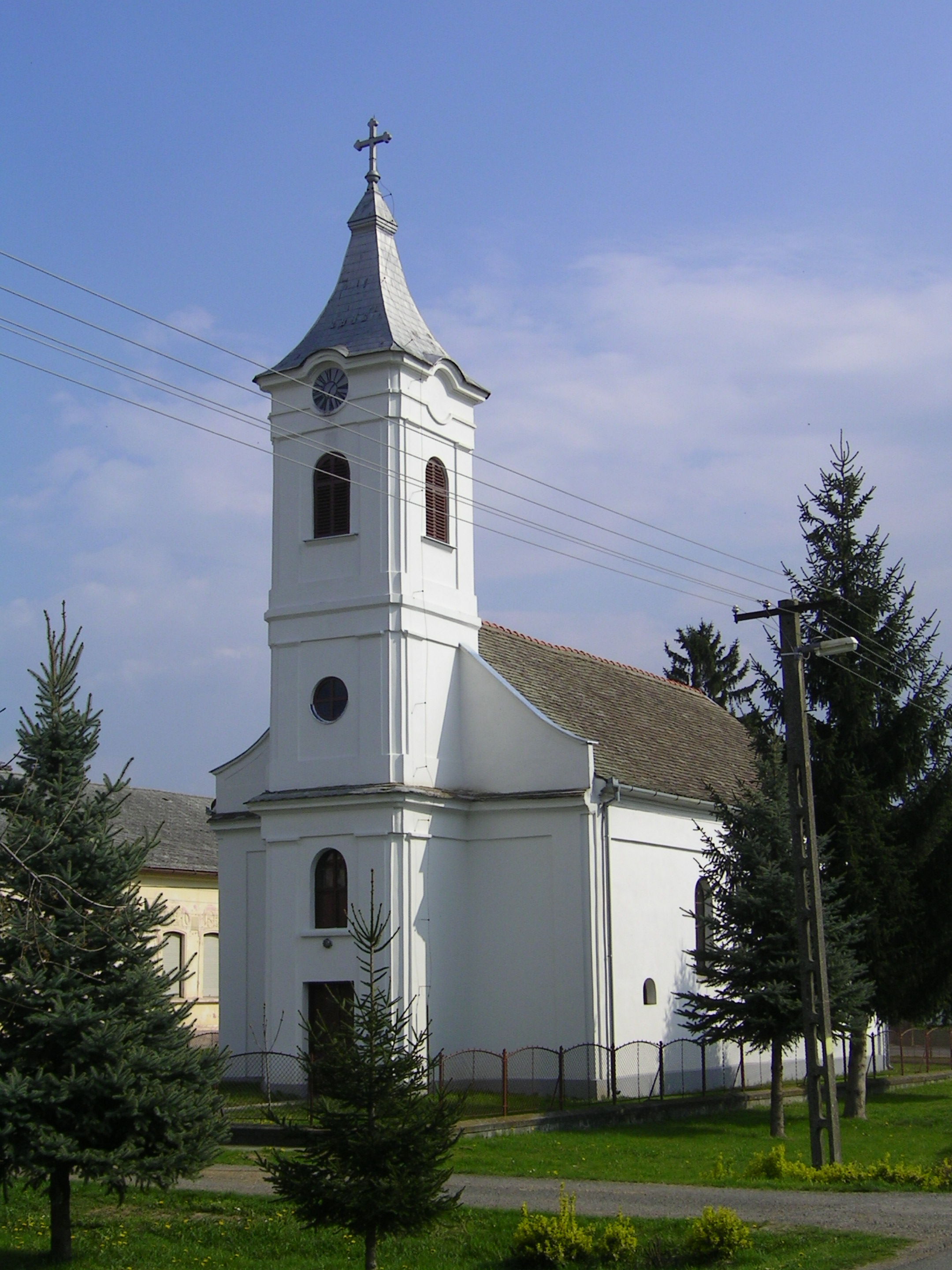
- Ivándárda ev
- Interactive map of Ivándárda
- Coordinates: 45°50′N 18°35′E
- Country: Hungary
- County: Baranya

Population (2025)
  - Total: 181
- Time zone: UTC+1 (CET)
  - Summer (DST): UTC+2 (CEST)

Ivándárda is a village in Baranya county, Hungary.
