= Bóly =

Bóly Bohl
- Town
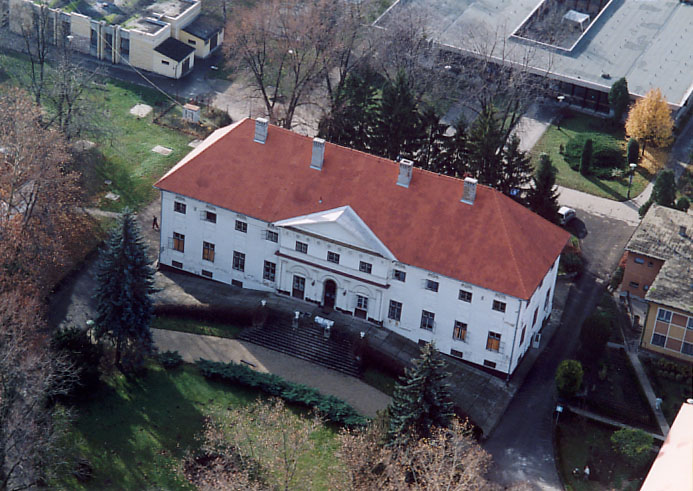
- Palace

- Flag Coat of arms

- Location of Bóly
- Coordinates: 45.96729°N 18.51825°E
- Country: Hungary
- County: Baranya
- District: Bóly

Area
  - Total: 25.44 km^{2} (9.82 sq mi)

Population (2022)
  - Total: 3,819
  - Density: 150.1/km^{2} (388.8/sq mi)
- Time zone: UTC+1 (CET)
  - Summer (DST): UTC+2 (CEST)
- Postal code: 7754
- Area code: (+36) 69
- Geocode: 33154
- Website: telepules.boly.hu

Bóly (German: Bohl; Croatian: Boja) is a town in Baranya County, Hungary. Today Hungarian, the town was historically home to a large Danube Swabian population.

== History ==
Until the end of World War II, the town's inhabitants were Danube Swabians, also locally known as Stifolder, because their ancestors arrived in the 17th and 18th centuries from the German district of Fulda. Most of the former German settlers were expelled to Allied-occupied Germany and Allied-occupied Austria in 1945–1948, under the Potsdam Agreement.

Few Germans remain today. The majority of the modern population are the descendants of Hungarians from the Czechoslovak–Hungarian population exchange. They occupied the houses of the former Danube Swabian inhabitants.

== Demographics ==
As of 2022, the town was 89.5% Hungarian, 16.6% German, 0.8% Croatian, and 1.8% of non-European origin. The population was 44.6% Roman Catholic, and 7.4% Reformed.

== Twin towns – sister cities ==
Bóly is twinned with:

- Semriach, Austria
- Heroldsberg, Germany
- Cernat, Romania
- Neded, Slovakia

== Sports ==
The local sports team is called Bólyi SE.
