= List of palaces and mansions in Baranya County =

This is a list of palaces and mansions in Baranya County in Hungary.

== List of palaces and mansions in Baranya County ==
Name	Location	Established	Architect	Style	Family	Picture	Present function
Majláth Mansion	Bakóca						
Fehér Mansion	Bár						
Sárga Mansion	Bár						
Puchner Mansion	Bikal	1849		Historicism	Puchner		Hotel
Igmándy Mansion	Boldogasszonyfa						
Batthyány Palace	Bóly						
Petrovszky Mansion	Bükkösd						
Jeszenszky Mansion	Bükkösd						
Festetics Mansion	Csertő						
Benyovszky Mansion	Görcsöny						
Episcopal Palace	Hosszúhetény						
Episcopal Palace	Mecseknádasd	1751 - 1753		Baroque	Bishop of Pécs		
Biedermann Mansion	Mozsgó						
Batthyány Mansion	Pécs						
Brázay Mansion	Pellérd						
Perczel Mansion	Rózsafa						
Draskovich Mansion	Sellye						
Sauska Mansion	Somberek						
Biedermann Mansions	Szentegát						
Esterházy	Szentlőrinc						
Szigetvár Mansion	Szigetvár						
Polák Mansion	Szigetvár						

== See also ==
- List of palaces and mansions in Hungary
- List of castles in Hungary

== Literature ==
- Zsolt Virág : Magyar Kastélylexikon - Baranya megye kastélyai, 2006
