= Szentlőrinc District =

Szentlőrinc District Szentlőrinci járás
- Districts of Hungary
- Coat of arms

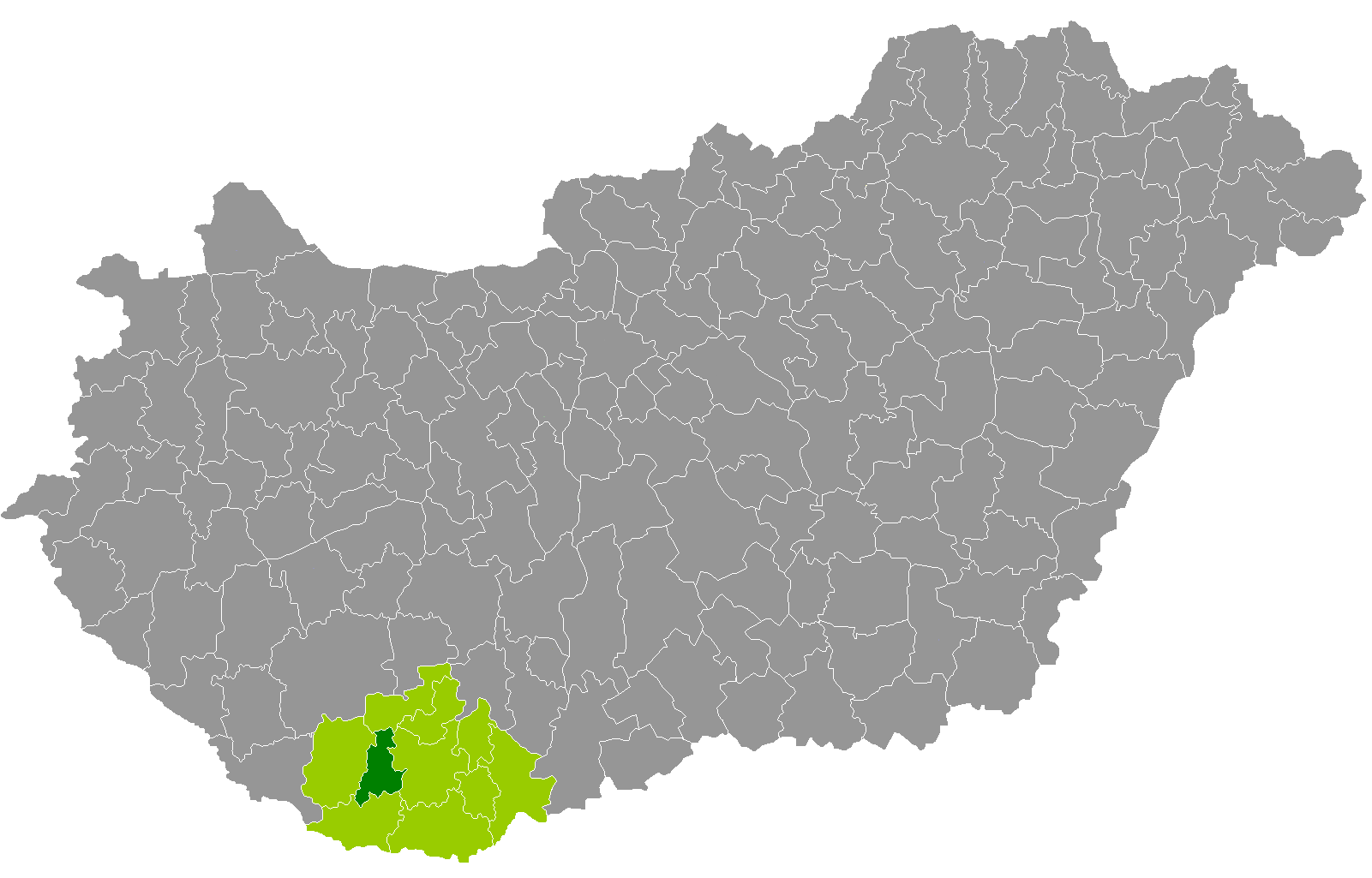
- Szentlőrinc District within Hungary and Baranya County.
- Coordinates: 46.04°N 17.99°E
- Country: Hungary
- County: Baranya
- District seat: Szentlőrinc

Area
  - Total: 282.43 km^{2} (109.05 sq mi)
  - Rank: 8th in Baranya

Population (2011 census)
  - Total: 14,998
  - Rank: 6th in Baranya
  - Density: 53/km^{2} (140/sq mi)

Szentlőrinc (Hungarian: Szentlőrinci járás) is a district in central-western part of Baranya County, Hungary. Szentlőrinc is also the name of the town where the district seat is located. The district is in the Southern Transdanubia Statistical Region.

== Geography ==
Szentlőrinc District borders with Hegyhát District to the north, Pécs District to the east, Sellye District to the south, Szigetvár District to the west. The number of the inhabited places in Szentlőrinc District is 21.

== Municipalities ==
The district has one town and 20 villages. (ordered by population, as of 1 January 2012)

- Bicsérd (1,008)
- Boda (436)
- Bükkösd (1,099)
- Cserdi (375)
- Csonkamindszent (177)
- Dinnyeberki (90)
- Gerde (520)
- Gyöngyfa (156)
- Helesfa (501)
- Hetvehely (417)
- Kacsóta (272)
- Királyegyháza (915)
- Okorvölgy (88)
- Pécsbagota (93)
- Sumony (406)
- Szabadszentkirály (785)
- Szentdénes (327)
- Szentkatalin (106)
- **Szentlőrinc** (6,848) – district seat
- Velény (146)
- Zók (277)

The bolded municipality is city.

== See also ==
- List of cities and towns in Hungary
