= Aranyosgadány =

Aranyosgadány Ranjoš (Croatian)
- Village
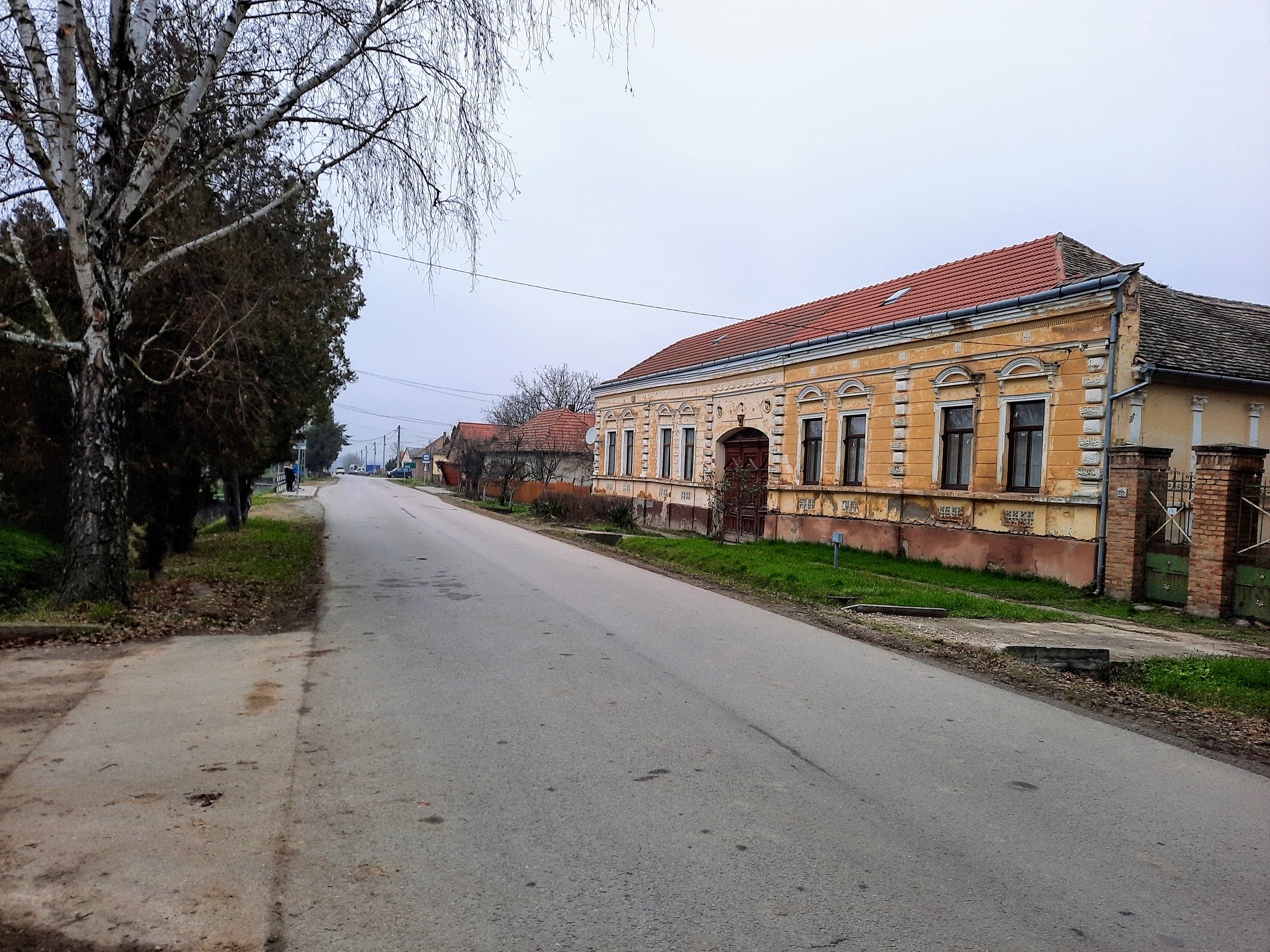
- Kossuth Lajos street

- Flag Seal

- Location of Aranyosgadány Aranyosgadány (Hungary)
- Coordinates: 46°0′18″N 18°7′16″E
- Country: Hungary
- County: Baranya
- District: Pécs

Area
  - Total: 3.19 sq mi (8.26 km^{2})

Population (1 Jan 2019)
  - Total: 323
  - Density: 101/sq mi (39.1/km^{2})
- Time zone: UTC+1 (CET)
  - Summer (DST): UTC+2 (CEST)
- Postal code: 7671
- Area code: 72
- NUTS 3 code: HU231
- HCSO code: 06886
- Website: www.aranyosgadany.hu

Aranyosgadány ([ˈɒrɒɲoʃˌɡɒdaːɲ], Croatian: Ranjoš) is a village (Hungarian: község) in central Baranya County, Pécs District, in southern Hungary. It is located in the western Baranya Hills. It was established in 1941 with the merger of the settlements of Keménygadány and Pécsaranyos. Its population at the 2011 Census was 355.

== Geography ==
The village is located at 46° 0′ 18.5″ N, 18° 7′ 15.92″ E. Its area is 8.26 km^{2} (3.19 sq mi). It is part of the Southern Transdanubia statistical region, and administratively it falls under Baranya County and then Pécs District.

It lies 11.3 km (7.0 mi) southwest of the city of Pécs and is bordered by the villages of Pellérd to the northeast, Görcsöny to the south, Zók to the west, and Bicsérd to the northwest.

== Demographics ==
Historical population
Year	Pop.	±%
1870	613	—
1880	630	+2.8%
1890	623	−1.1%
1900	608	−2.4%
1910	600	−1.3%
1920	568	−5.3%
1930	542	−4.6%
1941	575	+6.1%
1949	626	+8.9%
1960	515	−17.7%
1970	419	−18.6%
1980	345	−17.7%
1990	263	−23.8%
2001	367	+39.5%
2011	355	−3.3%
2019	323	−9.0%
Source: Hungarian Central Statistical Office

=== 2011 census ===
As of the census of 2011, there were 355 residents, 148 households, and 86 families living in the village. The population density was 111 inhabitants per square mile (43 inhabitants/km^{2}). There were 138 dwellings at an average density of 43 dwellings per square mile (17 dwellings/km^{2}).

There were 148 households, of which 56.8% were one-family households, 0.7% were multi-family households, 38.5% were one-person households, and 4.1% were other non-family households. The average household size was 2.40.

There were 86 families, of which 54.7% were couples living with children, 24.4% were couples living without children, 15.1% were single females with children, and 5.8% were single males with children. The average number of children was 1.45. The average family size was 3.24.

The age breakdown of the village was 29.9% under the age of 20, 5.6% between ages 20 and 24, 28.7% aged 25 to 44, 25.4% aged 45 to 64, and 10.4% aged 65 and older. The gender ratio was 1.01 males to every female.

In terms of educational attainment, 92.9% completed at least primary school, 22.5% completed at least secondary school with final examination, and 4.8% had a higher education degree.

Religious affiliation was 55.5% Roman Catholic, 3.9% Calvinist, 0.3% Lutheran, 1.7% other religion, and 10.1% unaffiliated, with 28.5% declining to answer.

Nearly a third of the village's population declared themselves as belonging to an ethnic minority. It had a German population of 10.7%, a Roma population of 10.1%, and a Croatian population of 8.5%, with small numbers of Romanians and others, non-native to Hungary, totaling less than 1%. The vast majority declared themselves as Hungarian (74.4%), with 23.4% declining to answer. (Note: As a person can affiliate themselves with more than one ethnic group (nationality), the totals may be greater than 100%.)

== Local government ==
The village is governed by a mayor with a four-person council. The local government of the village operates a joint council office with the nearby locality of Pellérd. The seat of the joint council is in Pellérd.

As of the election of 2019, the village also has local minority self-governments for its Croatian, German, and Roma communities, each with three elected representatives.

=== Mayors since 1990 ===
Mayor	Party	Term of Office
Lajosné Csurgyók	Independent	2019-
Lajosné Csurgyók	Independent	2014-2019
Lajosné Csurgyók	Independent	2010-2014
Lajosné Csurgyók	Independent	2006-2010
Lajosné Csurgyók	Independent	2002-2006
Lajosné Csurgyók	Independent	1998-2002
Lajosné Csurgyók	Independent	1994-1998
Jószef Vér	FKGP	1990-1994

== Transportation ==
=== Railway ===
- Bicsérd Train Station, 9.0 km (5.6 mi) to the northwest of the village. The station is on the Pusztaszabolcs–Pécs and Gyékényes–Pécs railway lines and is operated by MÁV.

== Notable people ==
- Zsigmond Kemény, writer, his family owned fief lands and hunting grounds in Keménygadány.
- László Papp, zoologist, and Lajos Papp, heart surgeon, brothers born in the village.
