= Zaláta =

- Village (Falva)
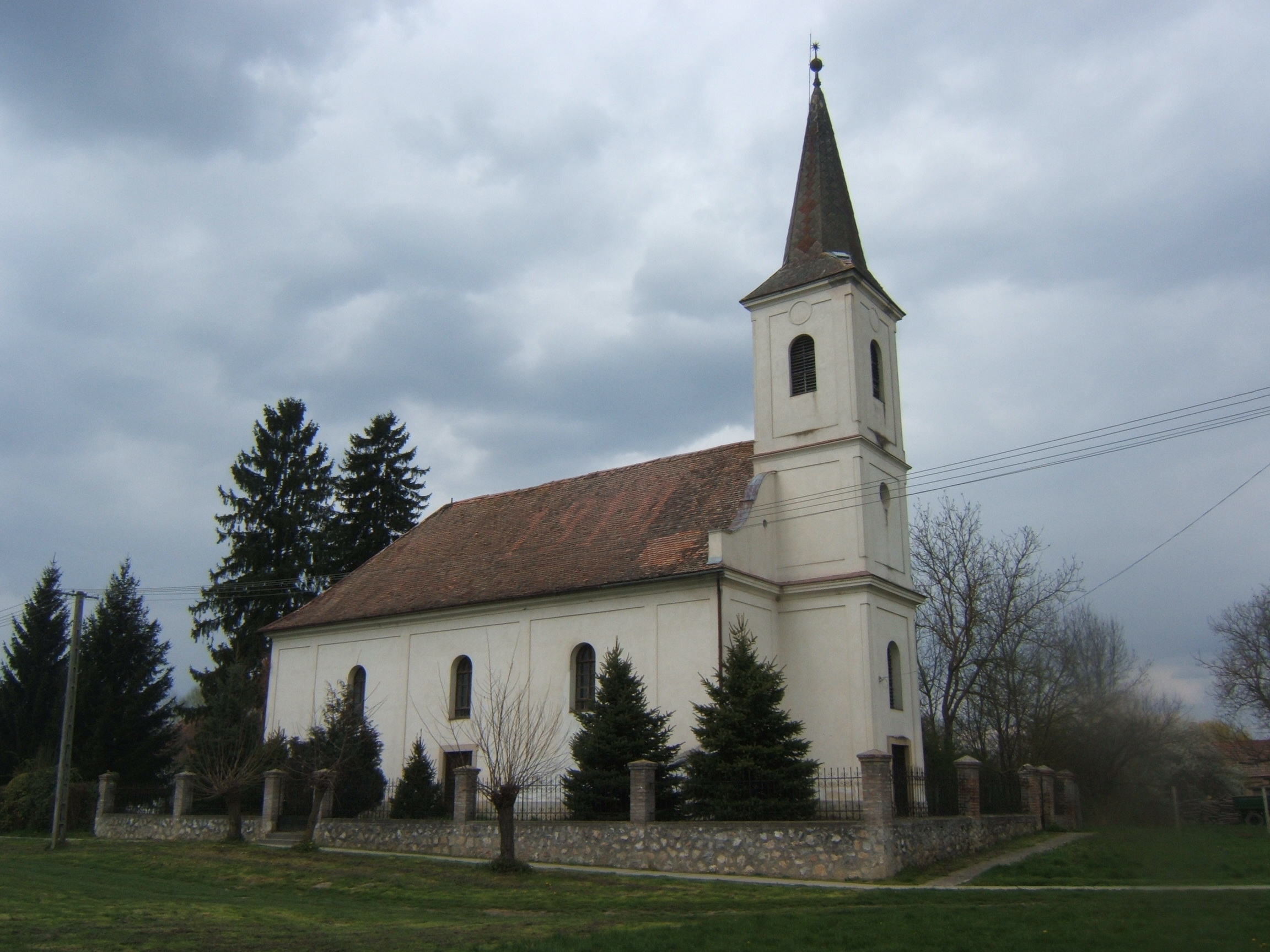
- Reformed church
- Interactive map of Zaláta
- Coordinates: 45°49′N 17°53′E
- Country: Hungary
- County: Baranya

Government
  - Mayor: Hekler Tibor (Fidesz-KDNP)

Area
  - Total: 21.83 km^{2} (8.43 sq mi)

Population (1 January 2024)
  - Total: 205
  - Density: 9.48/km^{2} (24.6/sq mi)
- Time zone: UTC+1 (CET)
  - Summer (DST): UTC+2 (CEST)
- Postal code: 7839
- Area code: 73

Zaláta is a village in Baranya county, Sellye District, Hungary. The village lies between Kemse and Sósvertike.

== Surroundings ==
Zaláta lies 1.5 km (0.93 mi) north of the Drava River and the Hungarian-Croatian border. It can be reached by road from three nearby towns: Kemse (to the north), Piskó (to the east), and Drávasztára (to the west). It is also connected to Sósvertike via dirt roads.

EuroVelo international bicycle route 13 passes by the village on the embankment of the Drava, following the border. From 1895 through 1970, the village could also be reach via the Sellye-Drávasztára-Zaláta-Slatina railway line.

The only significant watercourse is the Gürü channel, which collects water from areas south of Sellye and Csányoszró, then drains into the Drava. The village is adjacent to the Adravica wetlands, covering 18 hectares (44 acres). The wetlands are heavily overgrown and rick in species, but is endangered due to the agricultural cultivation of the surrounding areas and insufficient water supply.

== History ==
The village dates back to at least 1332, where a written record mentions the village. The village of Zaláta was the property of the Kőrös family. According to a document dated 1332, the Kőrösians sold their land to Pál Sztárai. The village was later the property of the Catholic church. The village already had a school in the 1700s.

Thirty-six inhabitants died in World War II. The producer cooperative was founded in 1959 and was attached to the cooperative of Vejti. In 1977, the village council was merged with the council of Vajszló. From 1991 to 2013, the village was an independent municipality under a district registrar. Between 1994 and 1998, the water tower and the water network were built, and the school building also received a new water block at that time. The school was closed in 2006, but the kindergarten continues to operate, but thirty students attend the school in Vajszló.

From 2013, the village was a settlement under the Hiricsi Joint Municipality Office. Since 2020, the village is a member town of the Csányoszró Joint Municipal Office.

== Demographics ==
Historical population
Year	Pop.	±%
2013	239	—
2014	224	−6.3%
2015	215	−4.0%
2019	218	+1.4%
2021	209	−4.1%
2022	219	+4.8%
2023	208	−5.0%
2024	205	−1.4%

The village has been gradually losing population since 2013 due to lack of jobs.

During the 2011 census, 90.3% of the residents identified themselves as Hungarian, 6.9% as Gypsy, and 0.8% as Croatian. The religious breakdown was as follows: Roman Catholic 55.6%, Reformed 27.4%, Lutheran 0.4%, Greek Catholic 0.4%, non-denominational 8.5%.

In 2022, 91.8% of the population identified themselves as Hungarian, 8.7% as Gypsy, 1.8% as German, 0.9% as Croatian, 0.5% as Romanian, and 0.9% as other, non-domestic nationalities. The religious identifications were: 52.1% Roman Catholic, 21% Reformed, 0.5% Lutheran, 0.5% other Catholic, and 14.2% non-denominational.

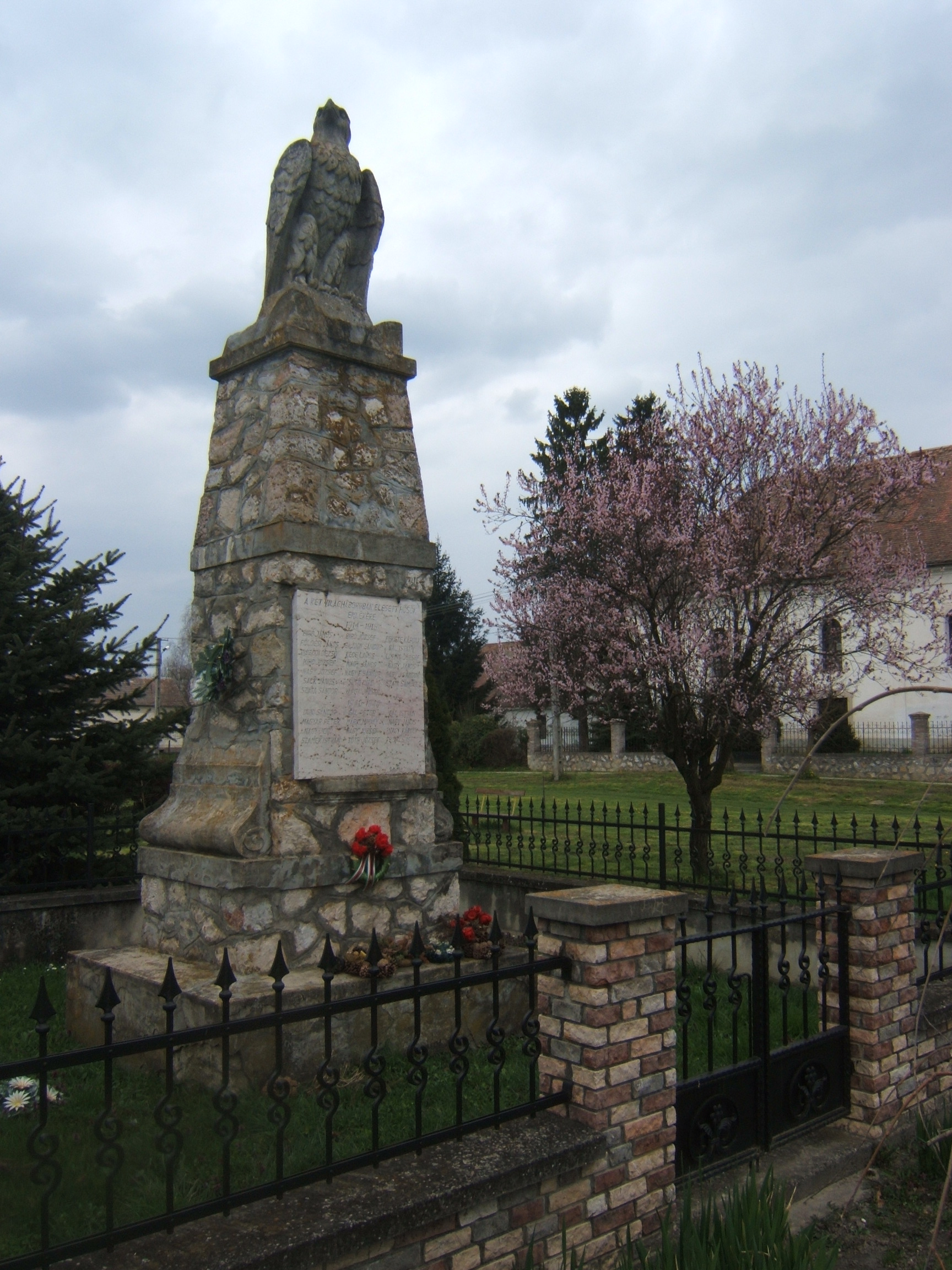
War heroes' monument

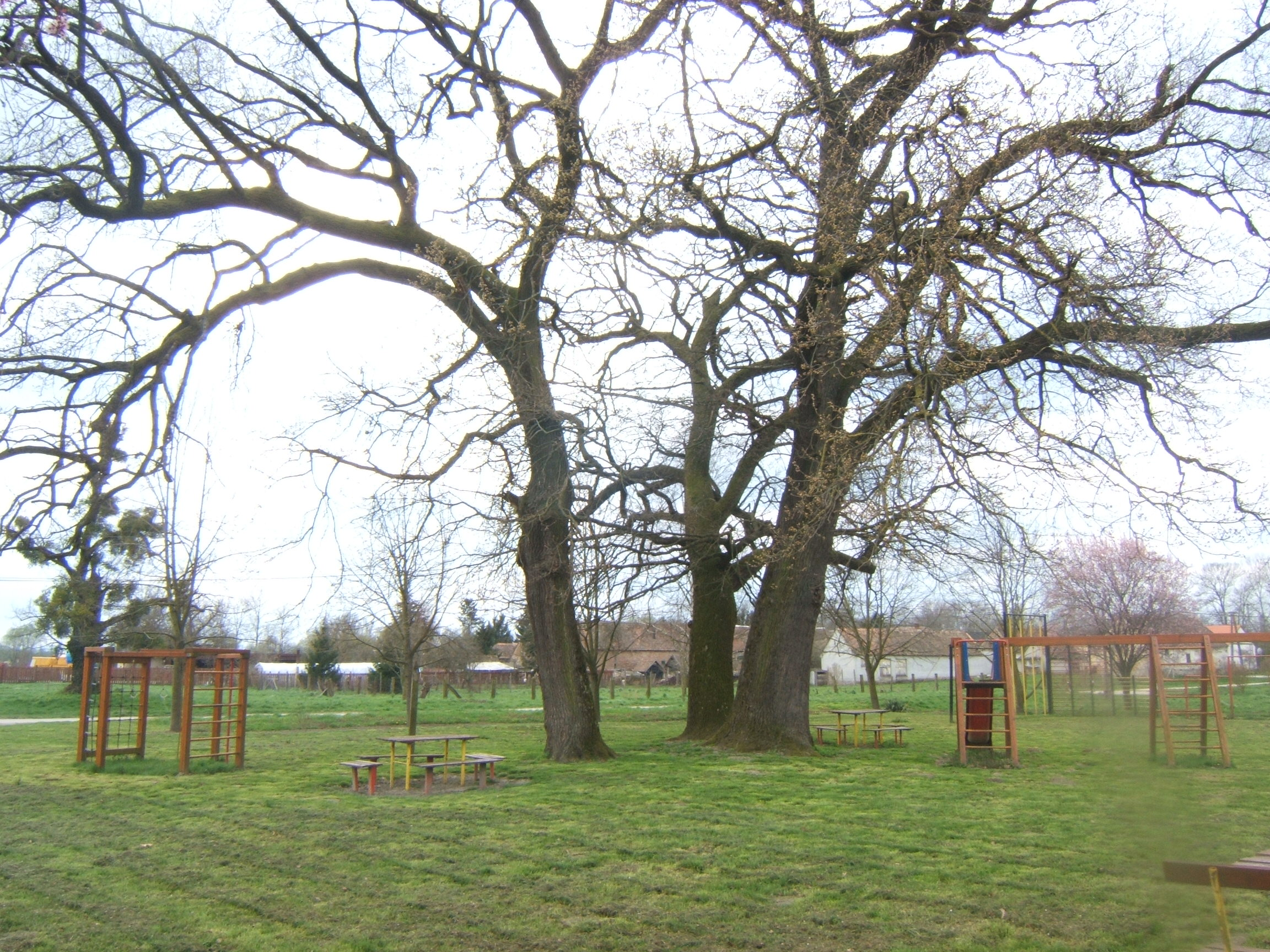
Trees planted in memory of Queen Elizabeth
