= Velény =

Velény Valinje, Velinjevo
- Village (Falva)
- Flag Coat of arms

- Location within Hungary Location within Baranya County
- Coordinates: 45°59′N 18°03′E
- Country: Hungary
- County: Baranya

Area
  - Total: 2.74 sq mi (7.09 km^{2})

Population
  - Total: 124
  - Density: 39.8/sq mi (15.37/km^{2})
- Time zone: UTC+1 (CET)
  - Summer (DST): UTC+2 (CEST)
- Postal code: 7951

Velény is a village in Szentlőrinc District, in Baranya county, Hungary.

== Location ==
The village is situated 25 kilometers southwest of Pécs in the valley of the Pécsi–víz. Due to the topographical conditions, only the part of its outskirts facing Szabadszentkirály is suitable for traditional cultivation. The hills on the other side of the village are covered with extensive forests and vineyards. Two streets run through the valley, characterized by comb-like development. Approximately 80 percent of the roads are paved. The installation of a piped drinking water system took place in 1992. The village became part of the national telephone network, accessible to subscribers at the end of 1996.

Neighboring settlements include Szabadszentkirály to the north, Pécsbagota to the northeast, Baksa to the southeast, Téseny to the south, and Gerde to the west.

Access It is a cul-de-sac settlement, reachable only by road, from the southern part of Szabadszentkirály, branching off the 58 148 side road from the 5802 road between Baksa and Szentlőrinc. From more distant parts of the country, the main approach is the M6 highway. Turning south at the eastern border of Szentlőrinc, it leads to the village.

== History ==
Hungarians settled in this area on the periphery of the floodplain of the Pécsi–víz during the time of the Hungarian conquest. The territory was given to the German Vencellin and his kin, who defeated the leader Koppány. The name of the village, Velény, is likely derived from this person. Its first written mention dates back to 1262 as Velin in the description of the borders. From 1736, it became the capitular estate of the Pécs diocese.

During the era of the council system, a joint council was established, and this association continues to operate in the form of a local government district today. After the 1990 elections, an independent local government was established, but the close relationship has persisted. The villages of Szabadszentkirály, Gerde, Velény, and Pécsbagota jointly operate the kindergarten and elementary school in Szabadszentkirály.

== Alternative names ==
The Croatian names for the settlement are Valinje (as referred to by the Croats in Szőke) and Velinjevo (designation by villagers from Rétfalva).

== Community life ==
=== Mayors ===
- 1990–1994: István Hunyadi (independent)
- 1994–1998: István Hunyadi (independent)
- 1998–2002: Árpádné Vas (independent)
- 2002–2006: István Róbert Németh (independent)
- 2006–2010: István Róbert Németh (independent)
- 2010–2014: József Hánik (independent)
- 2014–2019: József Hánik (independent)
- 2019– : József Hánik (independent)
