= Sellye District =

Sellye District Sellyei járás
- Districts of Hungary
- Coat of arms

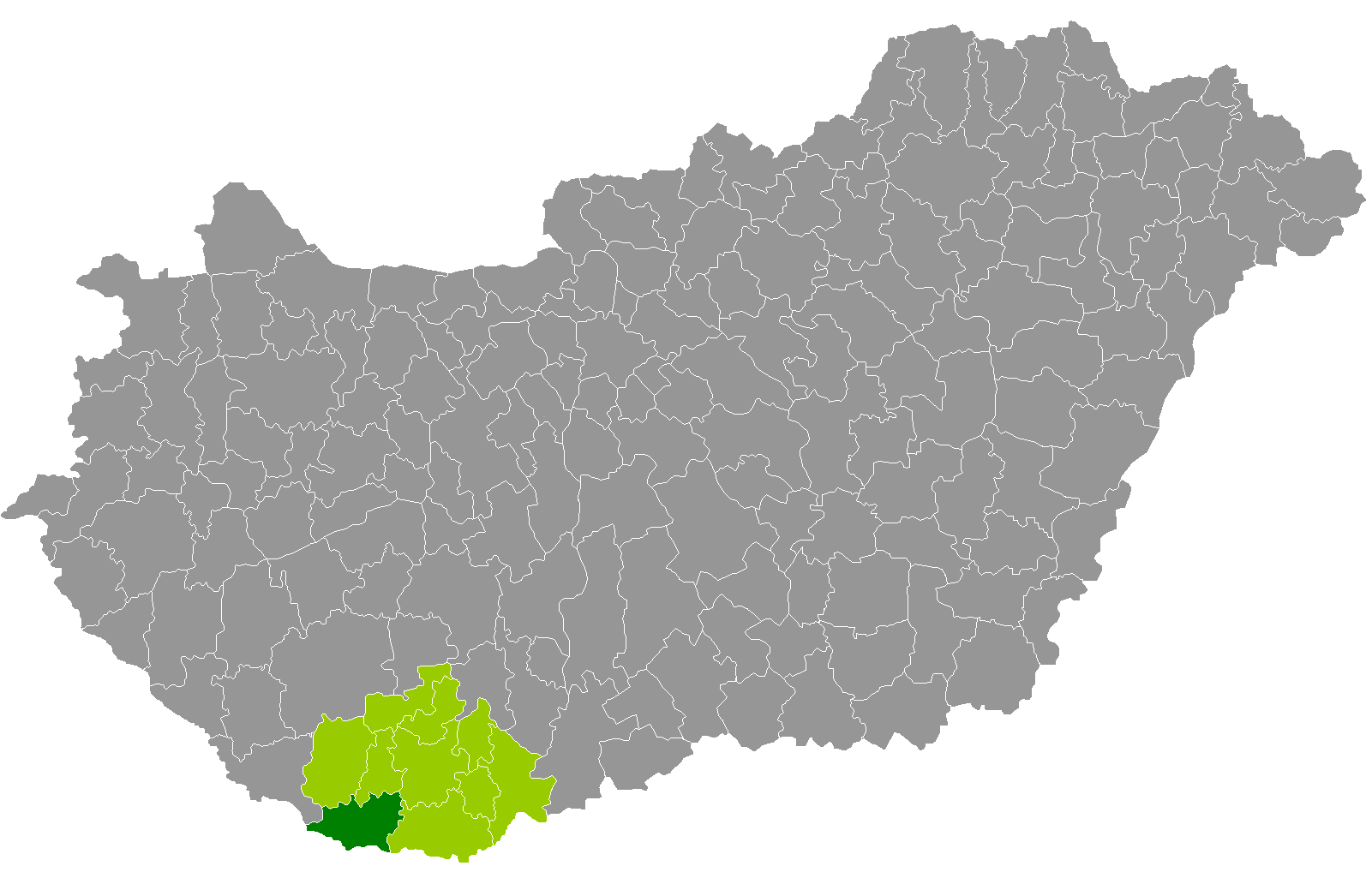
- Sellye District within Hungary and Baranya County.
- Coordinates: 45.87°N 17.85°E
- Country: Hungary
- County: Baranya
- District seat: Sellye

Area
  - Total: 493.69 km^{2} (190.61 sq mi)
  - Rank: 5th in Baranya

Population (2011 census)
  - Total: 14,192
  - Rank: 7th in Baranya
  - Density: 29/km^{2} (75/sq mi)

Sellye (Hungarian: Sellyei járás) is a district in south-western part of Baranya County, Hungary. Sellye is also the name of the town that is the location of the district seat. The district is located in the Southern Transdanubia Statistical Region.

== Geography ==
Sellye District borders with Szigetvár District and Szentlőrinc District to the north, Pécs District and Siklós District to the east, the Croatian counties of Virovitica-Podravina and Osijek-Baranja to the south, Barcs District (Somogy County) to the west. The number of the inhabited places in Sellye District is 38.

== Municipalities ==
The district has 1 town, 1 large village and 36 villages. (ordered by population, as of 1 January 2012)

- Adorjás (181)
- Baksa (769)
- Baranyahídvég (202)
- Besence (121)
- Bogádmindszent (431)
- Bogdása (276)
- Csányoszró (668)
- Drávafok (503)
- Drávaiványi (196)
- Drávakeresztúr (109)
- Drávasztára (398)
- Felsőszentmárton (881)
- Gilvánfa (369)
- Hegyszentmárton (408)
- Hirics (232)
- Kákics (227)
- Kemse (57)
- Kisasszonyfa (178)
- Kisszentmárton (261)
- Kórós (222)
- Lúzsok (266)
- Magyarmecske (309)
- Magyartelek (216)
- Markóc (55)
- Marócsa (86)
- Nagycsány (152)
- Okorág (167)
- Ózdfalu (177)
- Páprád (153)
- Piskó (241)
- Sámod (217)
- **Sellye** (2,752) – district seat
- Sósvertike (184)
- Tengeri (47)
- Téseny (323)
- Vajszló (1,694)
- Vejti (160)
- Zaláta (278)

The bolded municipality is city, italics municipality is large village.

== See also ==
- List of cities and towns in Hungary
