= Ózdfalu =

- Village
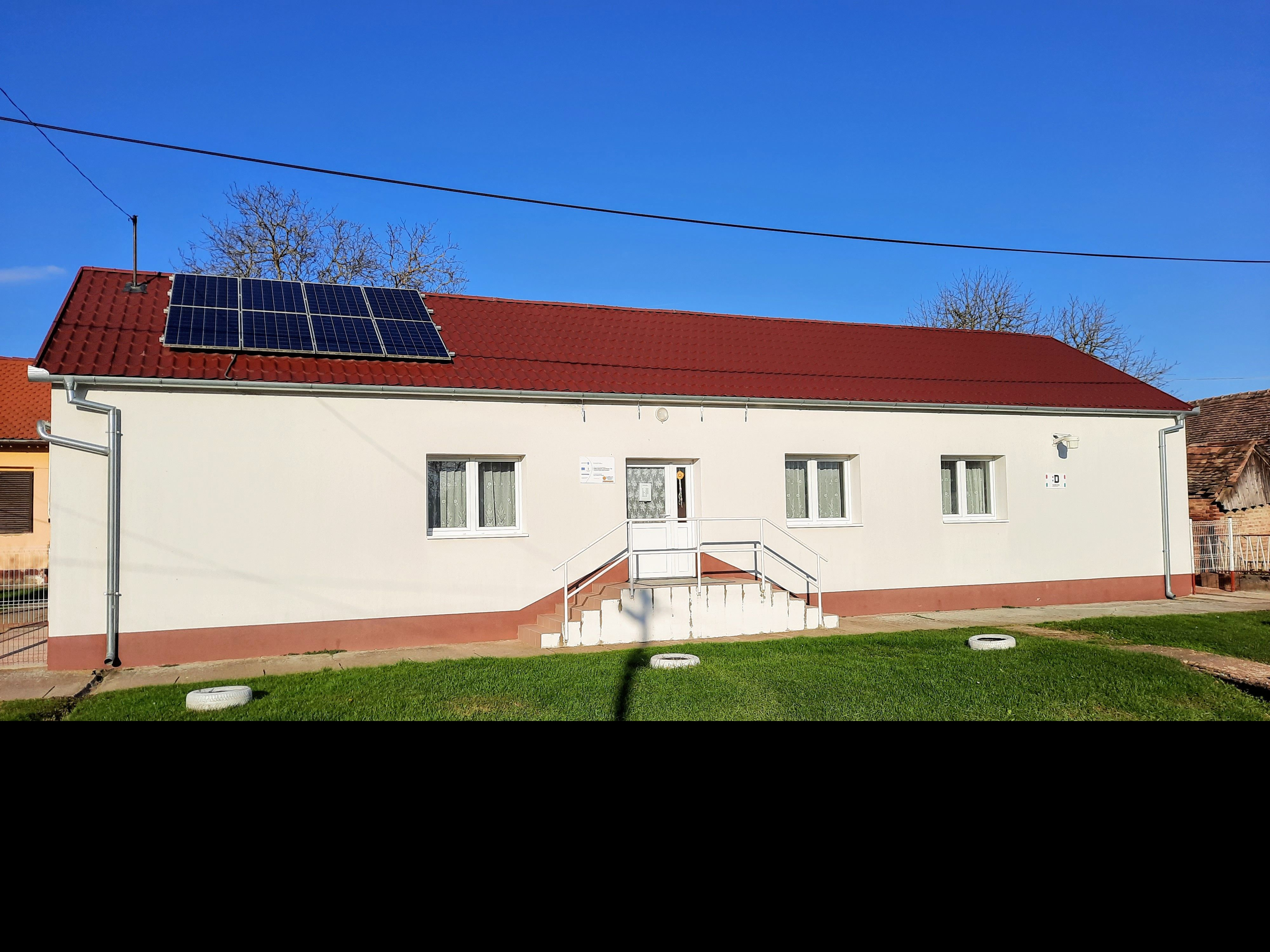
- Village hall

- Coat of arms

- Location within Hungary Location within Baranya County
- Coordinates: 45°56′N 18°01′E
- Country: Hungary
- County: Baranya

Population (2025)
  - Total: 140
- Time zone: UTC+1 (CET)
  - Summer (DST): UTC+2 (CEST)

Ózdfalu is a village in Sellye District, Baranya county, Hungary.

== Attractions ==
The Roman Catholic Church
