= Kacsóta =

- Village
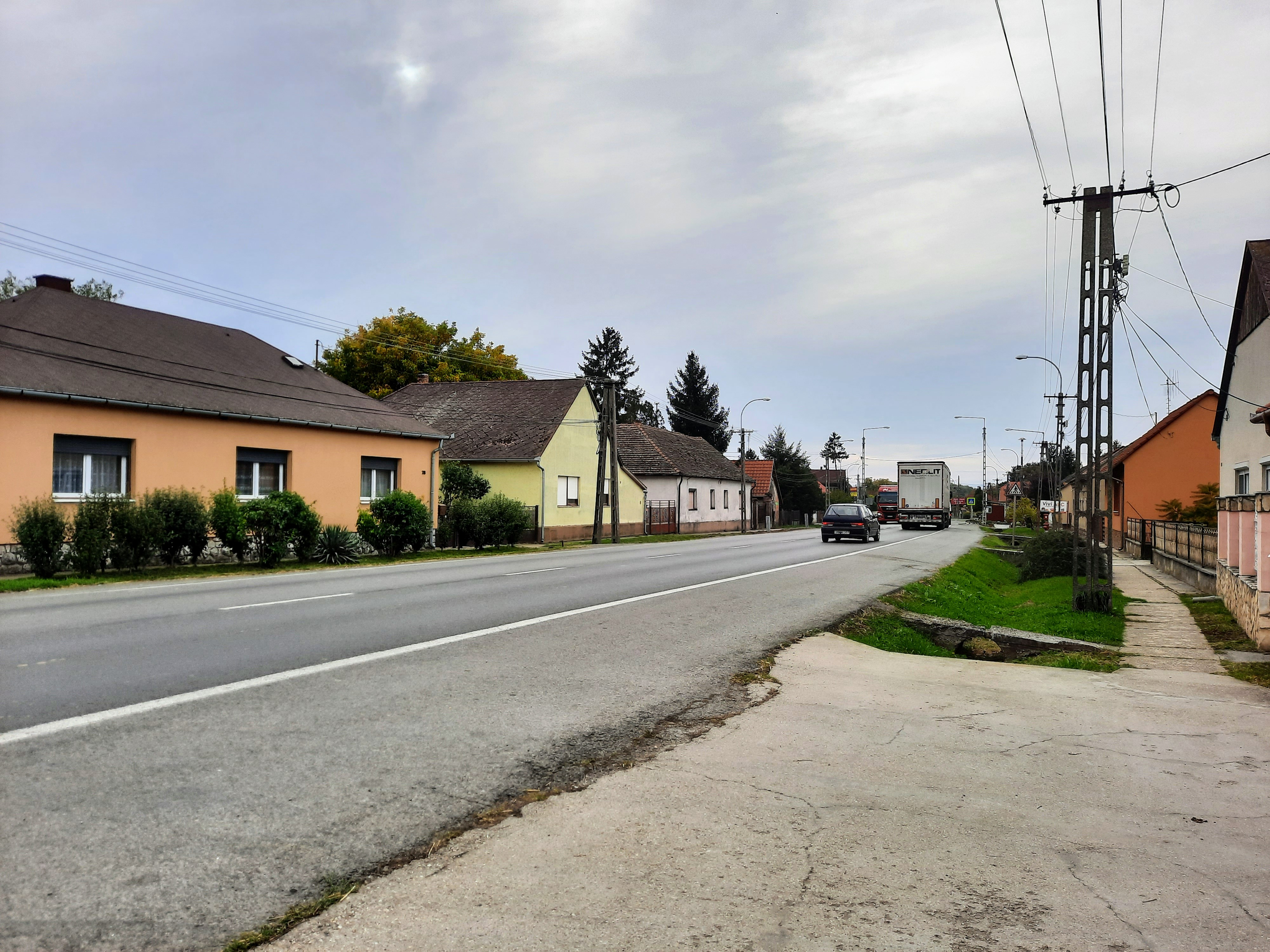

- Flag Coat of arms
- Interactive map of Kacsóta
- Coordinates: 46°02′N 17°57′E
- Country: Hungary
- County: Baranya

Area
  - Total: 3.67 sq mi (9.51 km^{2})

Population (2025)
  - Total: 289
- Time zone: UTC+1 (CET)
  - Summer (DST): UTC+2 (CEST)

Kacsóta is a village in Szentlőrinc District, in Baranya county, Hungary.
