= Páprád =

- Village
- Coat of arms

- Location of Páprád
- Coordinates: 45°54′N 18°01′E
- Country: Hungary
- County: Baranya

Government
  - Mayor: Vörös Kálmán (Ind.)

Area
  - Total: 12.11 km^{2} (4.68 sq mi)

Population (2022)
  - Total: 160
  - Density: 13/km^{2} (34/sq mi)
- Time zone: UTC+1 (CET)
  - Summer (DST): UTC+2 (CEST)
- Postal code: 7838
- Area code: 73
- Website: paprad.asp.lgov.hu

Páprád is a village in Sellye District, in Baranya county, Hungary.
