= Urbach Tower =

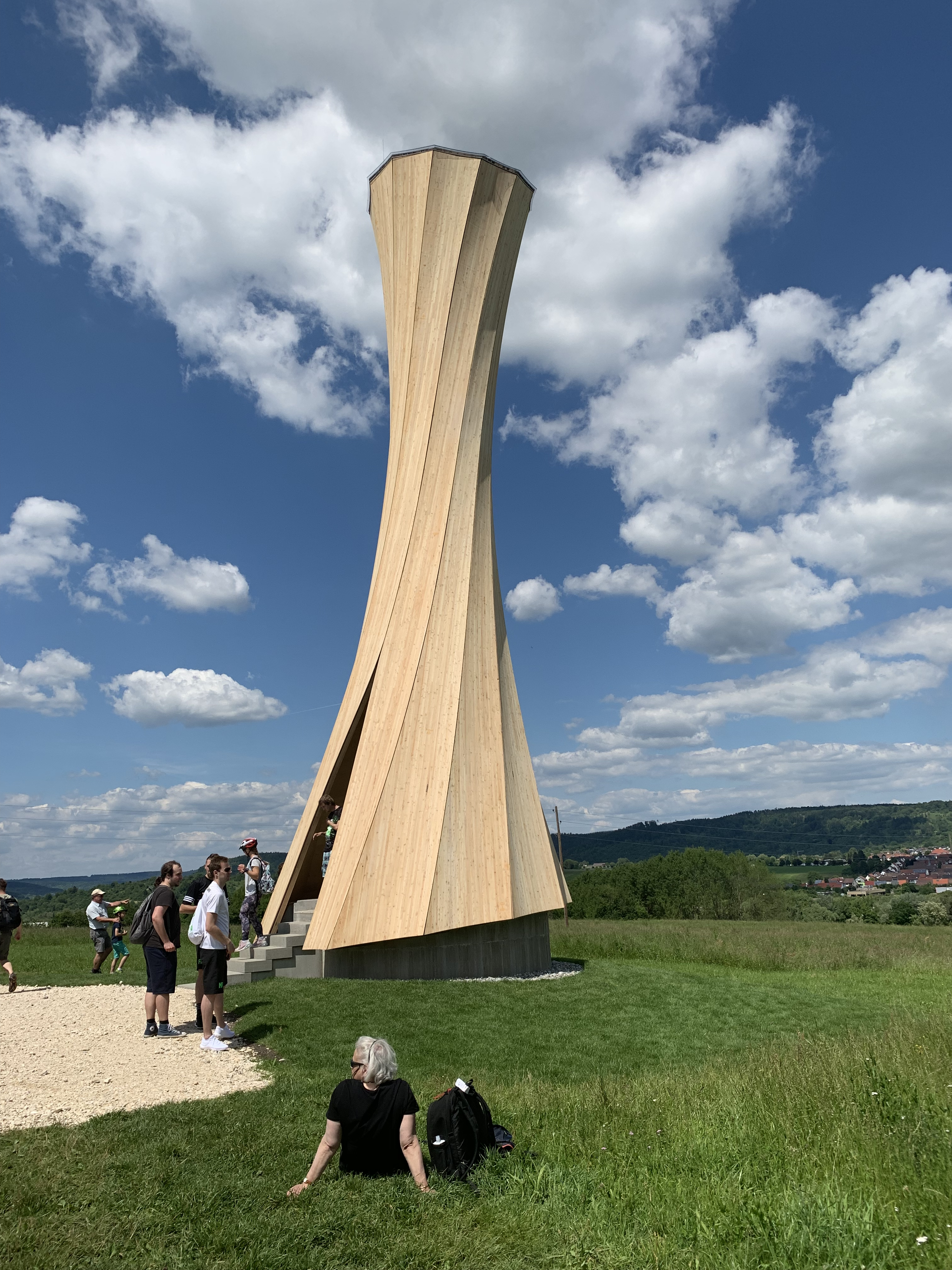
- Urbach Tower viewed from the south

- Location within Germany
- Alternative names: Urbach Turm, Station 7 "Turm an der Birke"

General information
- Type: Experimental structure
- Location: Urbach, Baden-Württemberg, Germany
- Coordinates: 48°48′10.1″N 9°33′54.4″E
- Inaugurated: 10 May 2019
- Client: Urbach / Remstal Gartenschau 2019

Height
- Height: 14.2 m (47 ft)

Dimensions
- Diameter: 3.5 m (11 ft)

Technical details
- Structural system: Curved Cross Laminated Timber (CLT)

Design and construction
- Architect: ICD - University of Stuttgart
- Structural engineer: ITKE - University of Stuttgart
- Other designers: Wood Materials Science - ETH Zurich / Empa
- Main contractor: Blumer Lehmann AG

The Urbach Tower (also known as Urbach Turm, Station 7, or Turm an der Birke) is a 14 m (46 ft) tall experimental structure that serves as a lookout point and shelter overlooking the municipality of Urbach, Baden-Württemberg.

== Description ==
The tower is one of sixteen small buildings constructed along the Rems river valley in the spring of 2019 for the Remstal Gartenschau 2019. The design and structural engineering for the tower was completed by the Institute for Computational Design and Construction (ICD) and the Institute of Building Structures and Structural Design (ITKE), at the University of Stuttgart in collaboration with the Wood Materials Science Group at ETH Zurich and the construction company Blumer-Lehmann AG in Gossau. The tower is open to the public and is directly accessible by foot or bike.

The tower is constructed from 12 curved cross-laminated timber building components produced using an experimental self-shaping manufacturing process. This process was invented in 2018 by researchers at the University of Stuttgart and Swiss Federal Laboratories for Materials Science and Technology. The self-shaping or self-bending of the wood is enabled by the smart assembly of flat, bi-layered plates where one layer is designed to intentionally shrink or swell with changing moisture but is restricted by the other layer while paralele fiber orientation. This results in extensive "self" shaping analogous to the Bimetallic strip. The shaping can be controlled based on the composition of the bilayer.

The high curvature of the tower is unique for wood construction. It is used to enhance structural performance and to create a unique interior space with convex curvature despite the concave and sharp edges of the exterior. The structure has the appearance of a double curved geometry but is actually made from an arrangement of single curved cylindrical parts. The building is protected by a larch wood facade coated with a titanium oxide surface treatment that protects the wood from ultraviolet light. Rather than darkening, this will cause the surface to turn a lighter whitish color over time.
