= Urbach, Baden-Württemberg =

Urbach
- Municipality
- Coat of arms

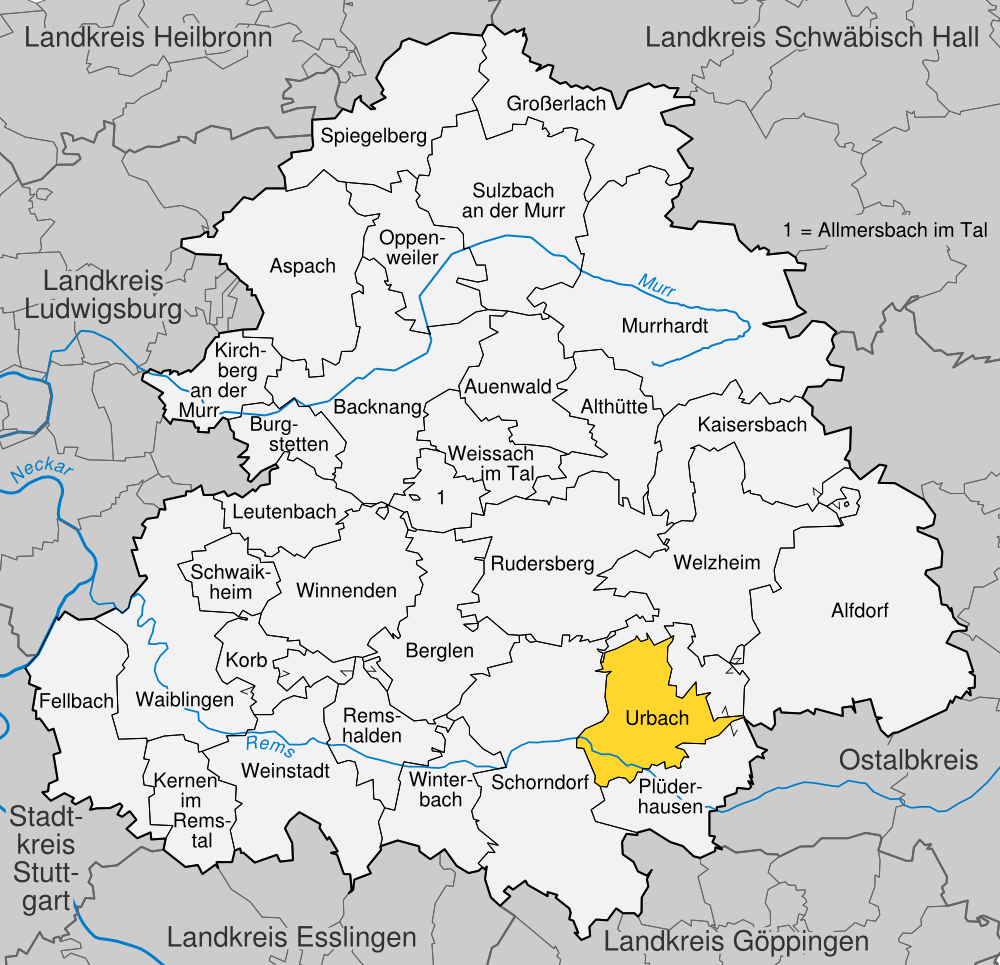
- Location of Urbach within Rems-Murr-Kreis district
- Interactive map of Urbach
- Location within Germany Location within Baden-Württemberg
- Coordinates: 48°48′48″N 09°34′44″E
- Country: Germany
- State: Baden-Württemberg
- Admin. region: Stuttgart
- District: Rems-Murr-Kreis

Government
  - Mayor (2018–26): Martina Fehrlen

Area
  - Total: 20.76 km^{2} (8.02 sq mi)
- Elevation: 275 m (902 ft)

Population (2025-12-31)
  - Total: 9,176
  - Density: 442.0/km^{2} (1,145/sq mi)
- Time zone: UTC+01:00 (CET)
  - Summer (DST): UTC+02:00 (CEST)
- Postal codes: 73656–73660
- Dialling codes: 07181
- Vehicle registration: WN
- Website: www.urbach.de

Urbach (German pronunciation: [ˈuːɐ̯bax]) is a municipality in the district of Rems-Murr in Baden-Württemberg, Germany. It is east of Stuttgart. It belongs to the metropolitan region of Stuttgart.

== History ==
=== Middle Ages ===
On 25 May 1181 Frederick I, Holy Roman Emperor "Barbarossa" issued a certificate in which he took the monastery at Adelberg under his protection. In the document, Urbach was referred to as Uracbach.

=== Modern times ===
Since their formation in 1819, the agricultural Oberurbach and the more industrial Unterurbach were two separate municipalities. Ober-and Unterurbach belonged initially to Oberamt Schorndorf and became part of the district of Waiblingen in 1938. In 1970 Ober- and Unterurbach were merged to form the district of Urbach. When Waiblingen was dissolved in 1973, Urbach became part of Rems-Murr-Kreis.

== Culture ==
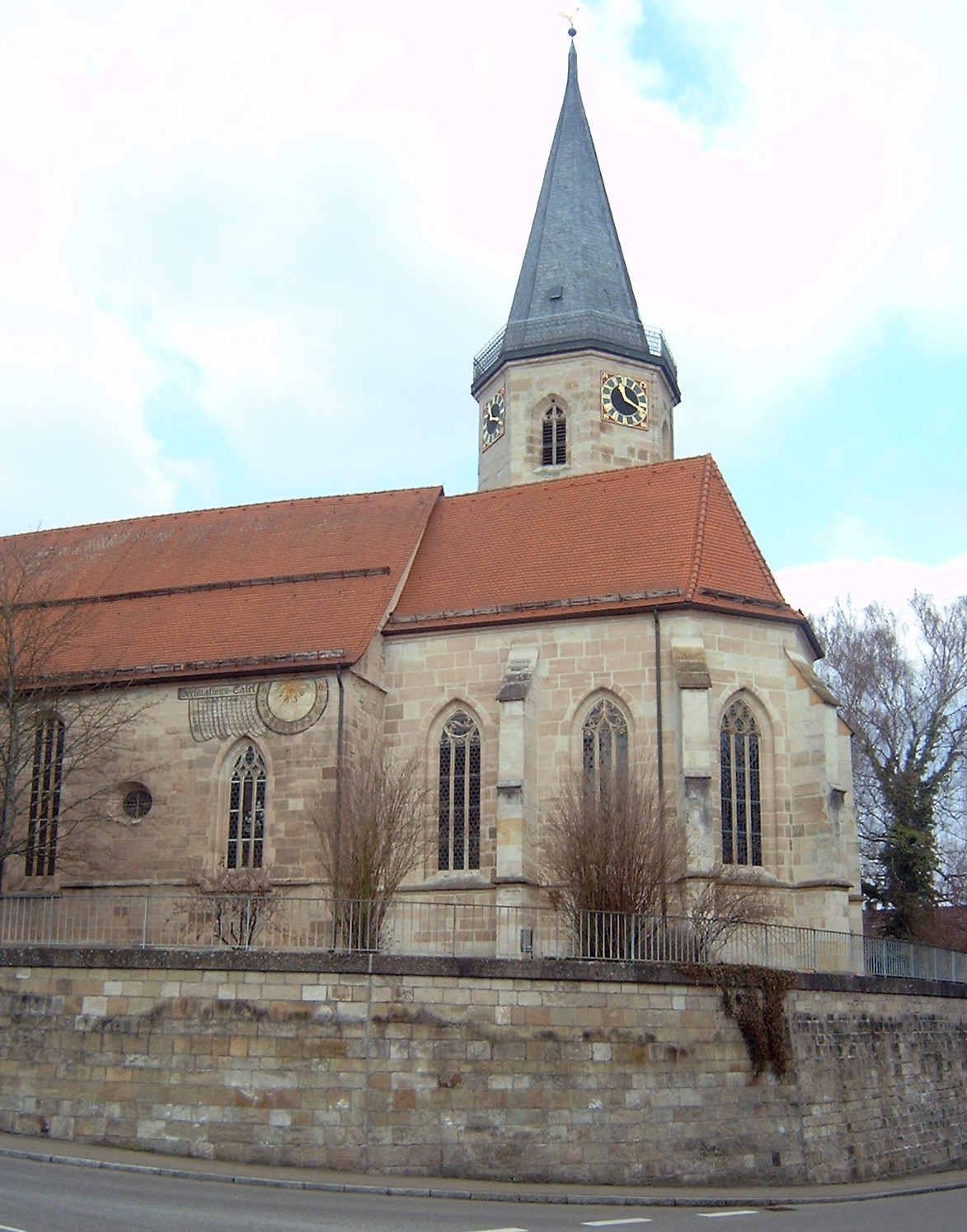
Urbach Afrakirche

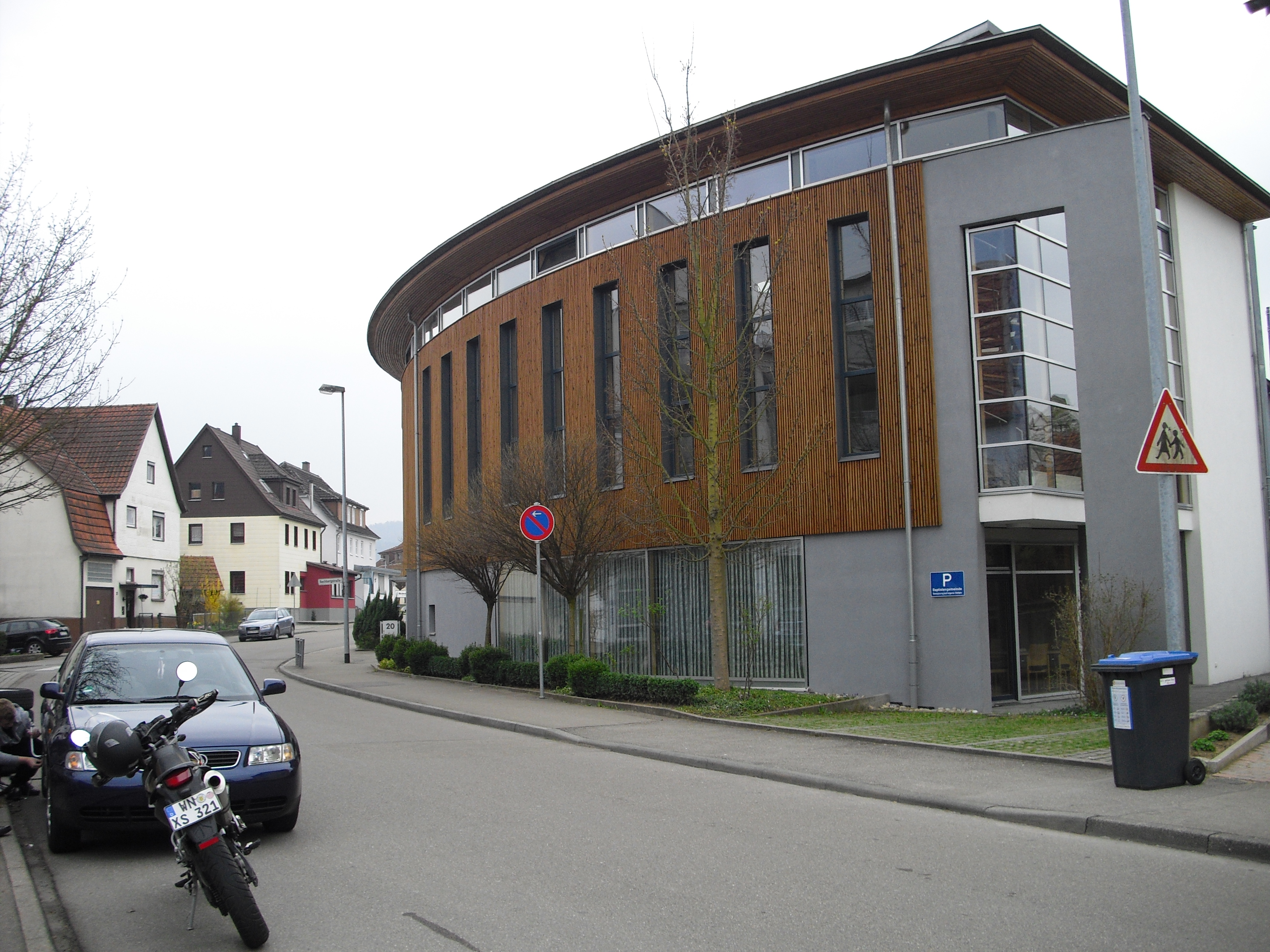
The Baptist Church

=== Buildings ===
- The Afrakirche is a Protestant church with parts built over the course of the 16th to 18th centuries.
- The Baptist Church was completed in 1999. In 2003 it was awarded with the "Freikirchlicher Architekturpreis".
- Urbach Tower is a 14-metre experimental structure that serves as a lookout point and shelter.

=== Museums ===
In Urbach there are two museums, the Museum am Widumhof and the Museum Farrenstall.

=== Twin Towns ===
Urbach is twinned with:

- Szentlőrinc, Hungary

== Sons and daughters of the town ==
- Theodor Bäuerle (born 16 June 1882 in Unterurbach; died 29 May 1956 in Stuttgart), politician (independent, Minister of Culture of Württemberg-Baden)
- Eleonore Dehnerdt (born 1956), writer
- Hermann Nuding (born 3 July 1902 in Oberurbach; died 31 December 1966 in Stuttgart), KPD -politician, (Bundestag, Landtag Württemberg-Baden)
