= Adorjás =

- Village
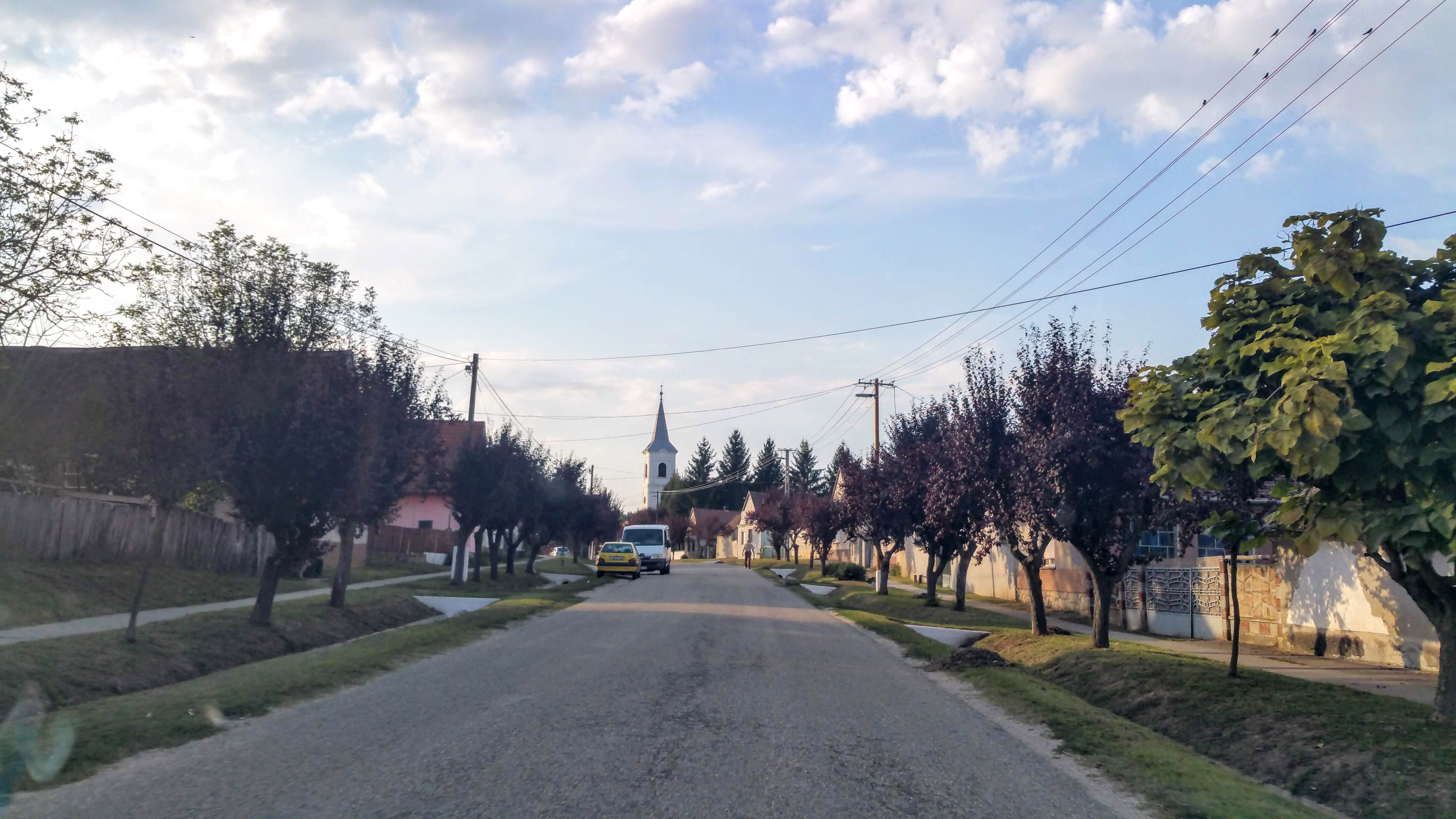
- Adorjás, Petőfi utca

- Flag Coat of arms
- Interactive map of Adorjás
- Coordinates: 45°51′N 18°04′E
- Country: Hungary
- County: Baranya

Area
  - Total: 3.1 sq mi (8.1 km^{2})

Population (2015)
  - Total: 180
  - Density: 58/sq mi (22/km^{2})
- Time zone: UTC+1 (CET)
  - Summer (DST): UTC+2 (CEST)

Adorjás is a village in Baranya county, Sellye District, Hungary.

The village was attested as Azarias in 1251, a toponym which comes from the personal name Azariah, used as Azariás in Hungary. On the influence of the similar-sounding name Adorján, the settlement's name evolved into Adorjás.
