= Bogdása =

- village
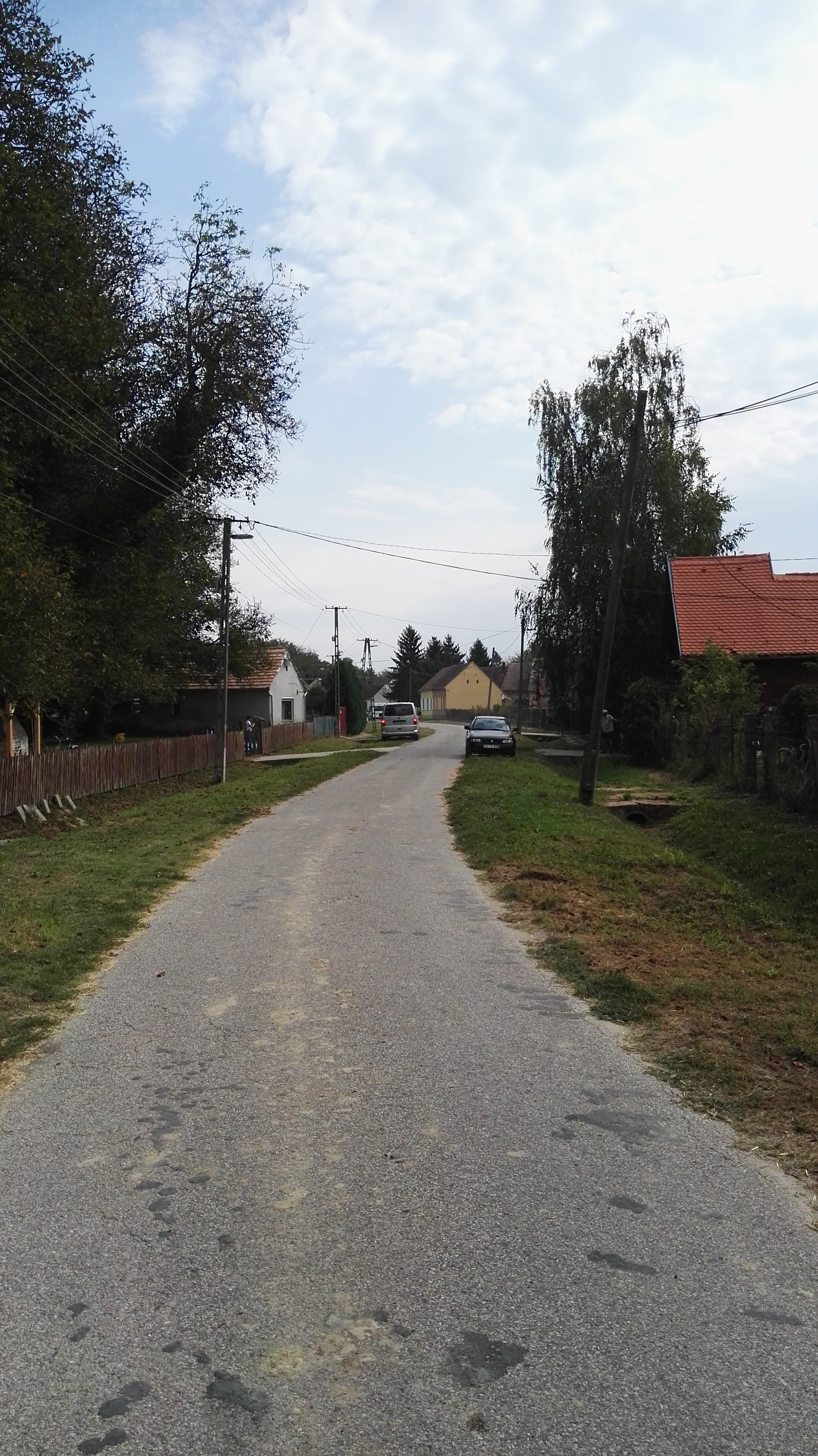

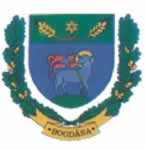
- Coat of arms
- Interactive map of Bogdása
- Bogdása
- Coordinates: 45.88°N 17.74°E
- Country: Hungary
- County: Baranya
- District: Sellye

Government

Area
  - Total: 2,099 km^{2} (810 sq mi)
  - Density: 1,182/km^{2} (3,060/sq mi)
- Postal code: 7966
- Website: https://www.sellye.hu/bogdasa

Bogdása (Croatian: Bogdašin) is a village in Baranya County, in Sellye District, west of Sellye, in the neighbourhood of Drávafok.

== History ==
The earliest known mention of the name of the village is found in a document of 1266, which testifies that the sons of the Haraszt-ethnic Miklós bán divided before the judge of the kingdom. According to the document, among the five sons, Sebestyén and Péter received Bogdás and Kustán in Baranya.

Later the Cserményi family owned the village, but in 1466 the Pécs Chapter bought the area. During the Turkish occupation, the area was depopulated, and in the early 18th century it was returned to the chateau as an uninhabited wasteland. From the mid-19th century, German and South Slavic families settled in the village.

Today's population is mixed Roman Catholic and Reformed, with separate churches for each denomination. The Catholic church, built in honour of Saints Peter and Paul, has a 15th century Gothic sanctuary and is the oldest church building in Ormanland still standing. The building was restored in 1749, when the nave and tower were given a Baroque form. The decoration is also noteworthy, with the main and side altars, the organ and the baptismal font in the 18th century in the tasseled style.

The Reformed already had their own preacher in 1734, but in 1747 they were deprived of their stone church. In 1786, as a result of a decree of toleration by Joseph II, they were allowed to build a new one, which was consecrated in 1834.

The village has not had its own priest for a long time: the parish priest of Sellyei serves the Catholic faithful, and the pastor of the Reformed parish of Drávafok-Kétújfalu serves the Reformed. On the initiative of a former mayor, ecumenical services have been held in the village on several occasions, underlining the responsibility for the village community.

During the 2018 parliamentary elections, the election commission made a mistake, as there were 25 more party-list ballots in the ballot box than there should have been. It is likely that the 25 national voters were given the party-list ballot papers, which were thus invalid.

== Public life ==
=== Mayors ===
- 1990-1994: Keresztes Sándor (independent)
- 1994-1998: Keresztes Sándor (MSZP)
- 1998-2002: Keresztes Sándor (MSZP)
- 2002-2006: Szatyor Győző (independent)
- 2006-2010: Szatyor Győző (independent)
- 2010-2014: Nagy Árpád (independent)
- 2014-2019: Nagy Árpád (independent)
- 2019-től: Nagy Árpád (independent)

== Population ==
In the 2011 census, 76.1% of the population declared themselves as Hungarian, 24.3% as Gypsy, 2.9% as Croatian, 0.4% as Romanian (23.9% did not declare; due to dual identities, the total may be higher than 100%).The religious breakdown was as follows: Roman Catholic 45.3%, Reformed 9.4%, Evangelical 1.1%, non-denominational 9.4% (33.3% did not declare).

== Highlights ==
The main attraction of the area are the floodplain forests and meadows managed by the Danube-Drava National Park, which offer a rich wildlife and many protected rarities to nature lovers. One of the largest oak trees in the country can be found on the border of Bogdása.

The village's squares are decorated with works by nationally renowned wood sculptor Győző Szatyor (former honorary mayor of the village), such as the Millennium Monument, the Baroque Stations Cross, the cemetery bell tower, the bus stop, but also fences, gates and woodwork in progress.

In the 19th century, one of the landmarks of the area, the Becsali inn, which was the legendary inn of the South Transdanubian outlawry between Drávafok and Bogdása, was still standing, and was built right on the county border, so that the poor peasants who stayed there could escape from the pandurs coming from the opposite direction from one room in the direction of Baranya and the other in the direction of Somogy county.
