= Puchner =

Puchner is a surname. Notable people with the surname include:

- Eric Puchner, American novelist and short story writer
- Joachim Puchner (born 1987), Austrian skier
- Martin Puchner, German literary critic and philosopher
- Mirjam Puchner (born 1992), Austrian skier
- Walter Puchner (born 1947), Austrian writer
- Willy Puchner (born 1952), Austrian photographer
