= Szabadszentkirály =

- Village (Falva)
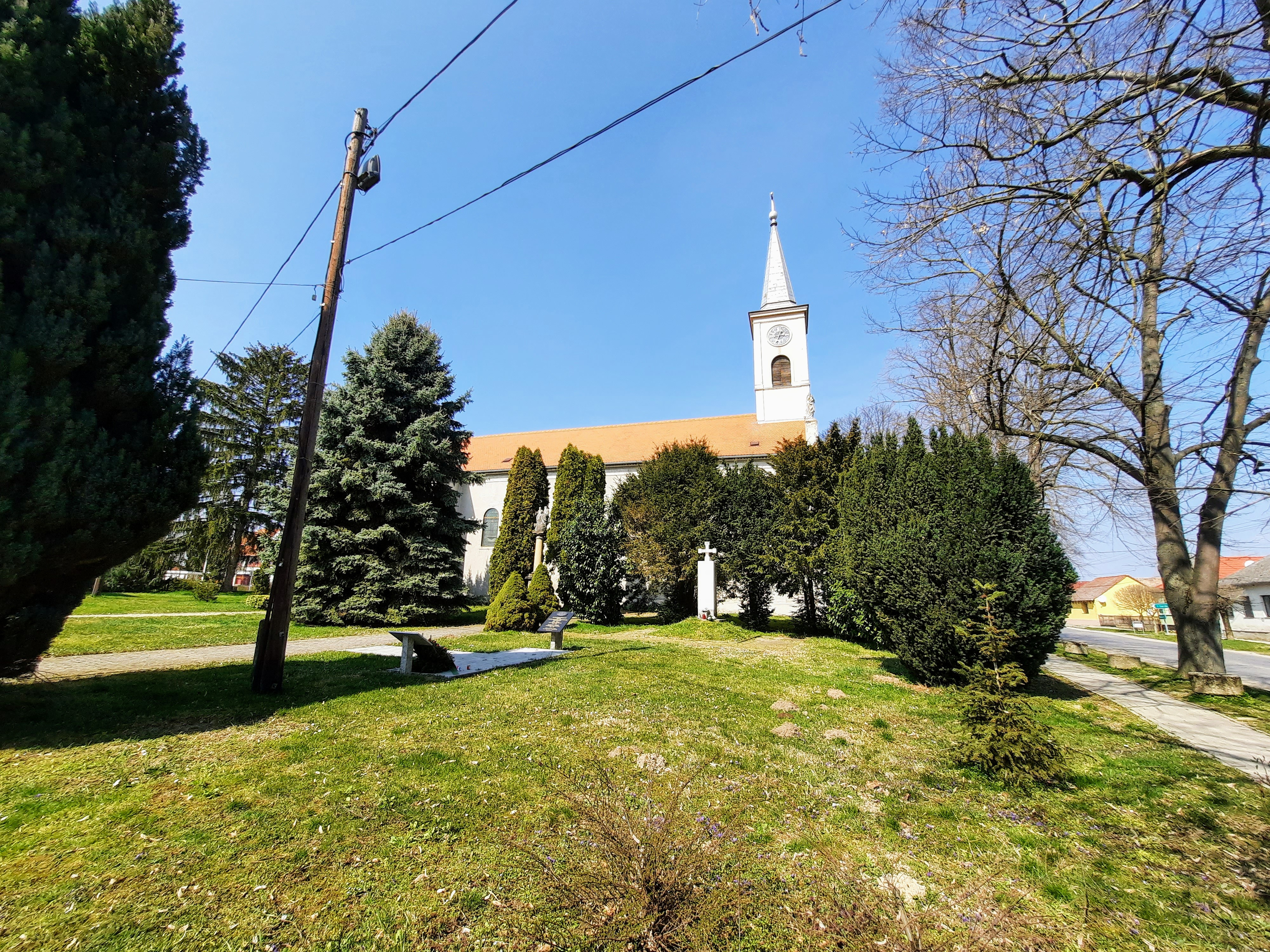

- Coat of arms

- Location of Baranya county in Hungary

- Location of Szabadszentkirály
- Coordinates: 46.00713°N 18.04555°E
- Country: Hungary
- County: Baranya

Area
  - Total: 12.69 km^{2} (4.90 sq mi)

Population (2004)
  - Total: 811
  - Density: 63.9/km^{2} (166/sq mi)
- Time zone: UTC+1 (CET)
  - Summer (DST): UTC+2 (CEST)
- Postal code: 7951
- Area code: 73

Szabadszentkirály is a village in Szentlőrinc District, Baranya county, Hungary.

== Layout ==
It is situated in the central-western part of the county, in the southeastern vicinity of Szentlőrinc. The neighboring settlements include Bicsérd to the northeast, Pécsbagota to the southeast, Velény to the south, Gerde to the southwest, and Királyegyháza to the west. The primary access is by road, with the main approach being the 5802 road running between Baksa and Szentlőrinc. Gerdé is connected by the 58 123 side road, and Velény is linked by the 58 148 side road, while there is no direct road connection to Bicsérd and Királyegyháza.

There is no railway line, and the nearest railway connection is Szentlőrinc station on the shared section of the Pusztaszabolcs–Pécs railway, Gyékényes–Pécs railway, and Sellye–Szentlőrinc railway, located approximately 7 kilometers northwest of the center.

== History ==
The name Szabadszentkirály (Szentkirály) was first mentioned in charters in 1326 as Bart. Between 1332 and 1335, it was referred to in the form Bart. (sac.) de S. Rege. In 1326, a priest representing the Pécs chapter was mentioned. The nobility of the village is said to have been granted by King Zsigmond. The settlement remained inhabited during the Ottoman era.

In 1681, they received a new deed from King Leopold I, which was announced at the county assembly of Baranya in 1697. However, since the deed did not list names but only mentioned the nobles of Szentkirály, the county assembly instructed them in 1716 to individually prove their noble lineage. Seeking royal protection again, especially because the chapter forced them to perform serf duties, they turned to King Charles III. In 1720, Charles III reaffirmed Leopold's deed and instructed the county to defend them against any violence. A committee was sent out, which in 1721, based on documents and testimonies, established the nobility of 15 families. This recognition was reaffirmed during general noble investigations in 1725. The Roman Catholic church was built in 1849. In the early 20th century, it belonged to the Szentlőrinc district of Baranya county.

In the 1910 census, it had 849 residents, of whom 833 were Hungarian, including 836 Roman Catholics, 6 Reformed, and 6 Jewish. In the 2011 census, 89.2% of the population identified as Hungarian, 9.9% as Roma, 1.3% as Croatian, 1% as German, and 0.3% as Romanian and Serbian each (10.8% did not declare; due to dual identities, the total percentage may exceed 100%). The religious distribution was as follows: Roman Catholic 69.3%, Reformed 3.8%, Lutheran 0.4%, and 5.9% unaffiliated (18.9% did not declare).
