= Vajszló =

- Large village
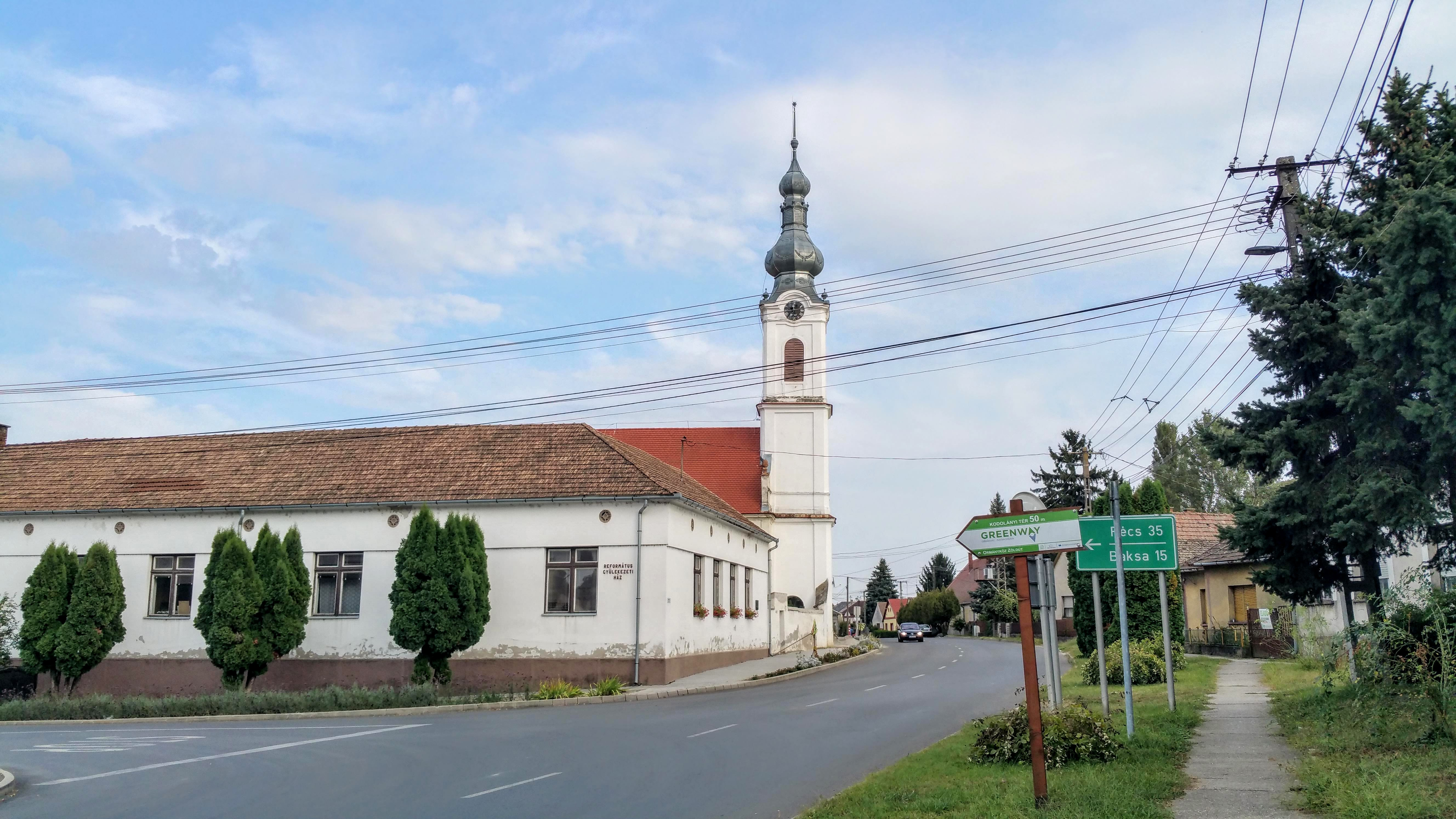

- Flag Coat of arms

- Location of Vajszló
- Coordinates: 45.863333°N 17.976111°E
- Country: Hungary
- Region: Southern Transdanubia
- County: Baranya
- District: Sellye

Area
  - Total: 17.71 km^{2} (6.84 sq mi)

Population (1 January 2026)
  - Total: 1,534
  - Density: 86.62/km^{2} (224.3/sq mi)
- Time zone: UTC+1 (CET)
  - Summer (DST): UTC+2 (CEST)
- Postal code: 7838
- Area code: (+36) 73

Vajszló (Croatian: Vajslovo) is a village in Baranya County, Hungary.
