= Sellye =

- Town
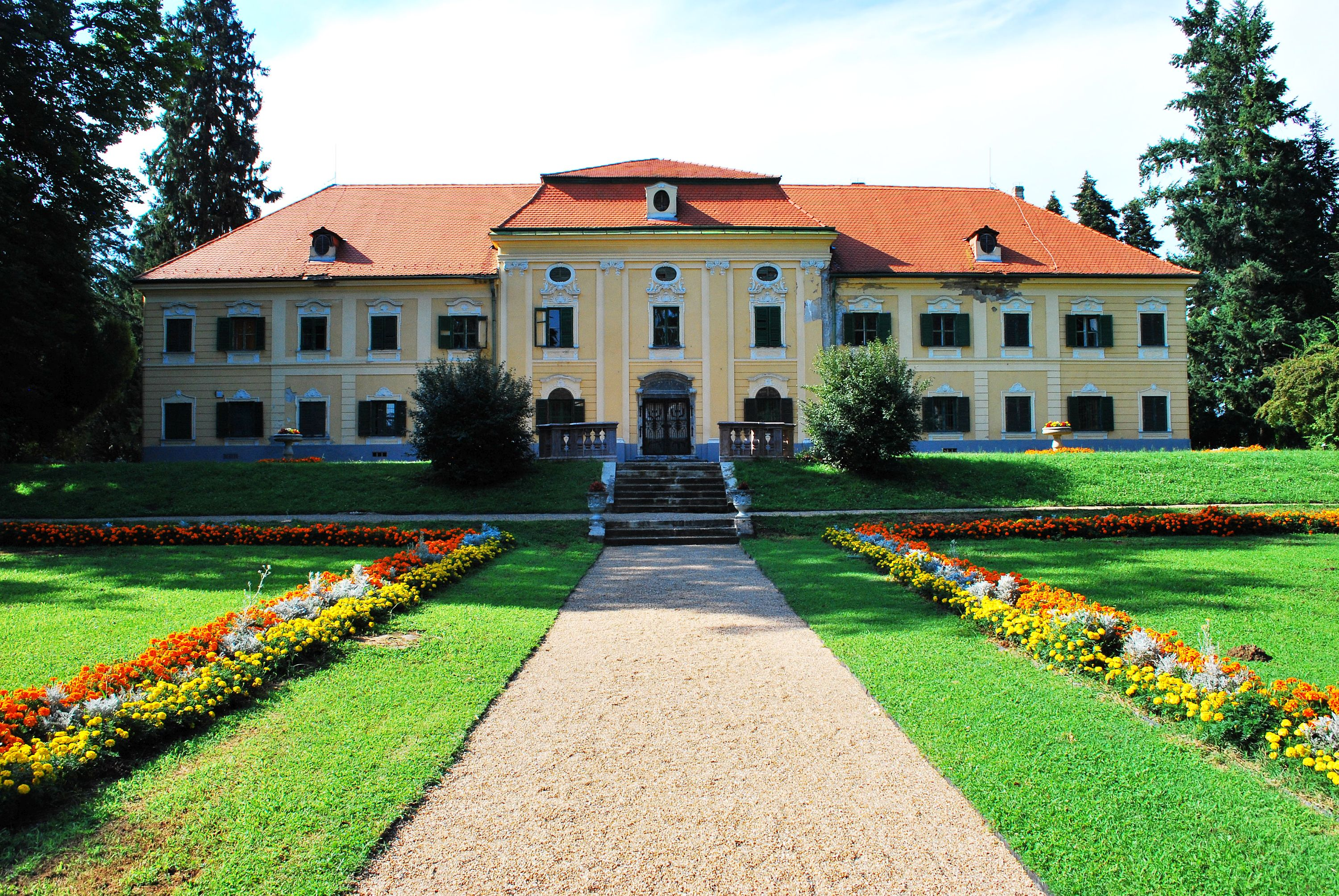

- Flag Coat of arms

- Location of Sellye
- Coordinates: 45.87200°N 17.84577°E
- Country: Hungary
- County: Baranya
- District: Sellye

Area
  - Total: 25.18 km^{2} (9.72 sq mi)

Population (2024)
  - Total: 3,050
  - Density: 115.6/km^{2} (299/sq mi)
- Time zone: UTC+1 (CET)
  - Summer (DST): UTC+2 (CEST)
- Postal code: 7960
- Area code: (+36) 73
- Website: www.sellye.hu

Sellye (Hungarian pronunciation: [ˈʃɛjːɛ]; Croatian: Šeljin) is a town in Baranya county, southern Hungary. It is the centre of the Ormánság region located in the southern part of the county.

== History ==
According to László Szita, the settlement was completely Hungarian in the 18th century.

== Twin towns ==
Sellye is twinned with:

- Gnas, Austria
- Grubišno Polje, Croatia
