= Pécsbagota =

- Village
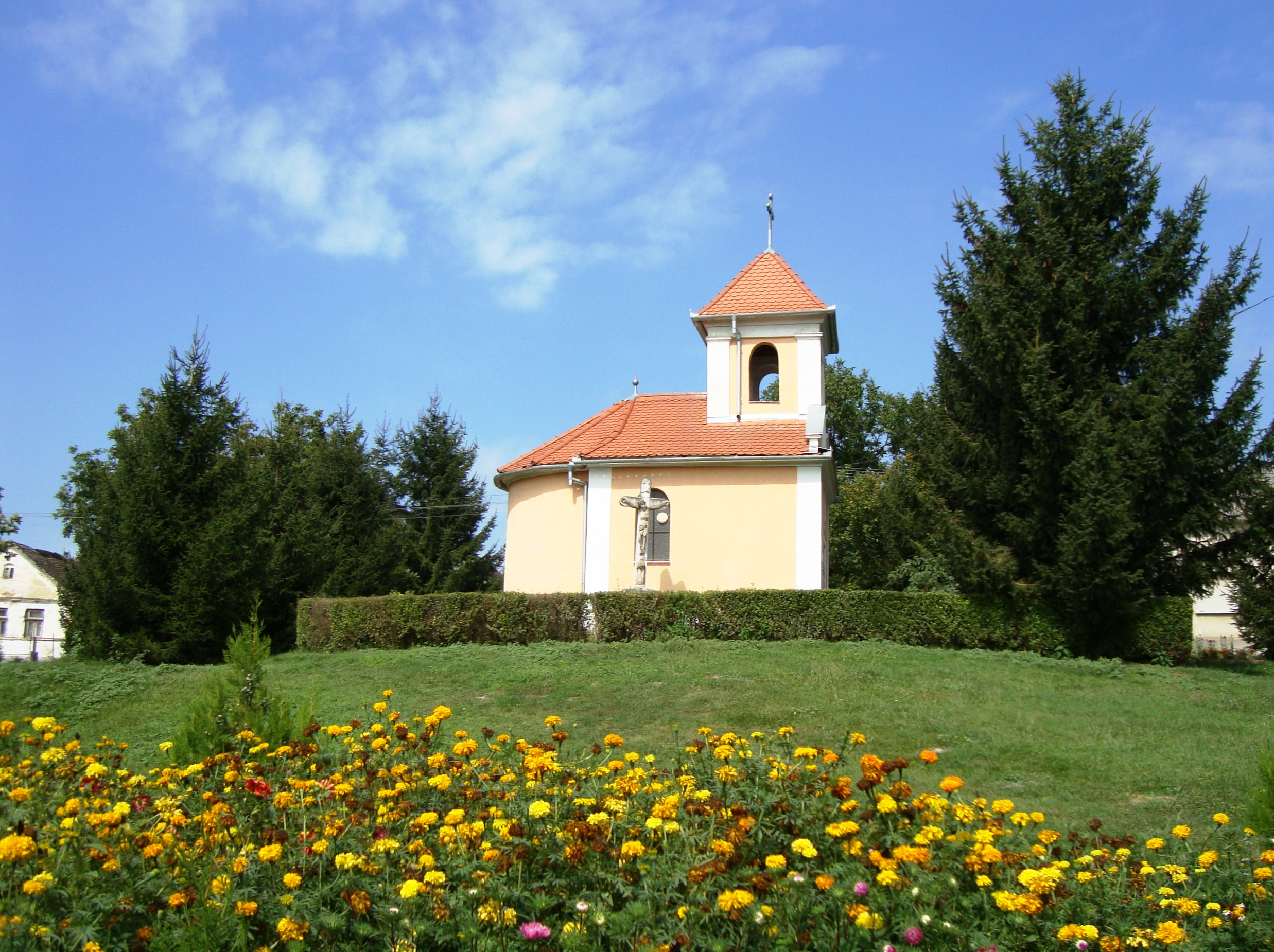
- Our Lady's Chapel, Pécsbagota
- Interactive map of Pécsbagota
- Coordinates: 45°59′N 18°04′E
- Country: Hungary
- County: Baranya

Population (2025)
  - Total: 107
- Time zone: UTC+1 (CET)
  - Summer (DST): UTC+2 (CEST)

Pécsbagota is a village in Baranya county, Hungary.
