= Szentlőrinc =

- Town
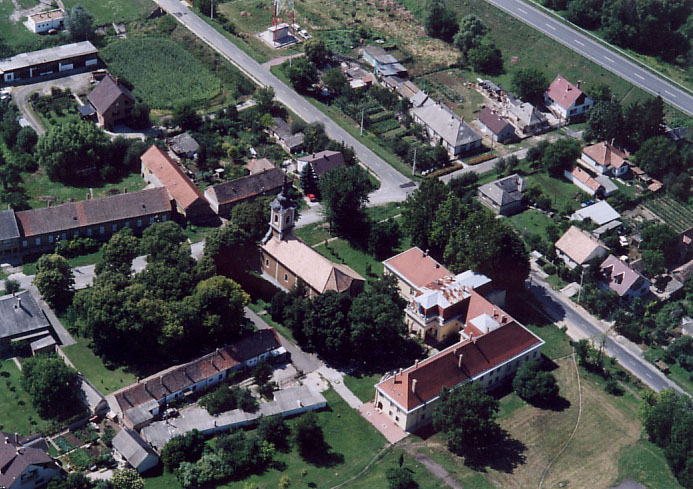
- Szentlőrinc - Palace

- Flag Coat of arms

- Location of Szentlőrinc
- Coordinates: 46.04226°N 17.98563°E
- Country: Hungary
- County: Baranya
- District: Szentlőrinc

Government
  - Mayor: Péter Koltai (Ind.)

Area
  - Total: 27.81 km^{2} (10.74 sq mi)

Population (2023)
  - Total: 6,042
  - Density: 253.95/km^{2} (657.7/sq mi)
- Time zone: UTC+1 (CET)
  - Summer (DST): UTC+2 (CEST)
- Postal code: 7940
- Area code: (+36) 73
- Website: www.szentlorinc.hu

Szentlőrinc (Croatian: Selurinac, Selovrenac, Selurac, Selurince, Selerenac) is a town in Baranya county, Hungary. The current mayor of Szentlőrinc is Péter Koltai, who is independent, and all the members of the municipal council are also independent.

== Demographics ==
According to a 2023 report, the population is 6,042 with 2,548 dwellings. According to the Census from 2022, the majority of the population is Hungarian at 88.9%, with minorities of German (2.6%), Romani (2.4%), and Croatians (1.0%). The majority religion is Roman Catholic with 34.5% and 15.4% said they belong to a church.

== Sport ==
The association football club Szentlőrinc SE, currently competing in the Nemzeti Bajnokság III, are based in the town.

== Twin towns ==
Szentlőrinc is twinned with:

- Urbach, Germany - since 1997
