= Kemse =

- Coat of arms

- Location of Baranya county in Hungary

- Location of Kemse
- Coordinates: 45.82285°N 17.91314°E
- Country: Hungary
- County: Baranya

Area
  - Total: 8.96 km^{2} (3.46 sq mi)

Population (2004)
  - Total: 72
  - Density: 8.03/km^{2} (20.8/sq mi)
- Time zone: UTC+1 (CET)
  - Summer (DST): UTC+2 (CEST)
- Postal code: 7839
- Area code: 73

Kemse (Croatian: Kemša) is a village in Baranya county, Hungary.
