= Görcsöny =

- Village
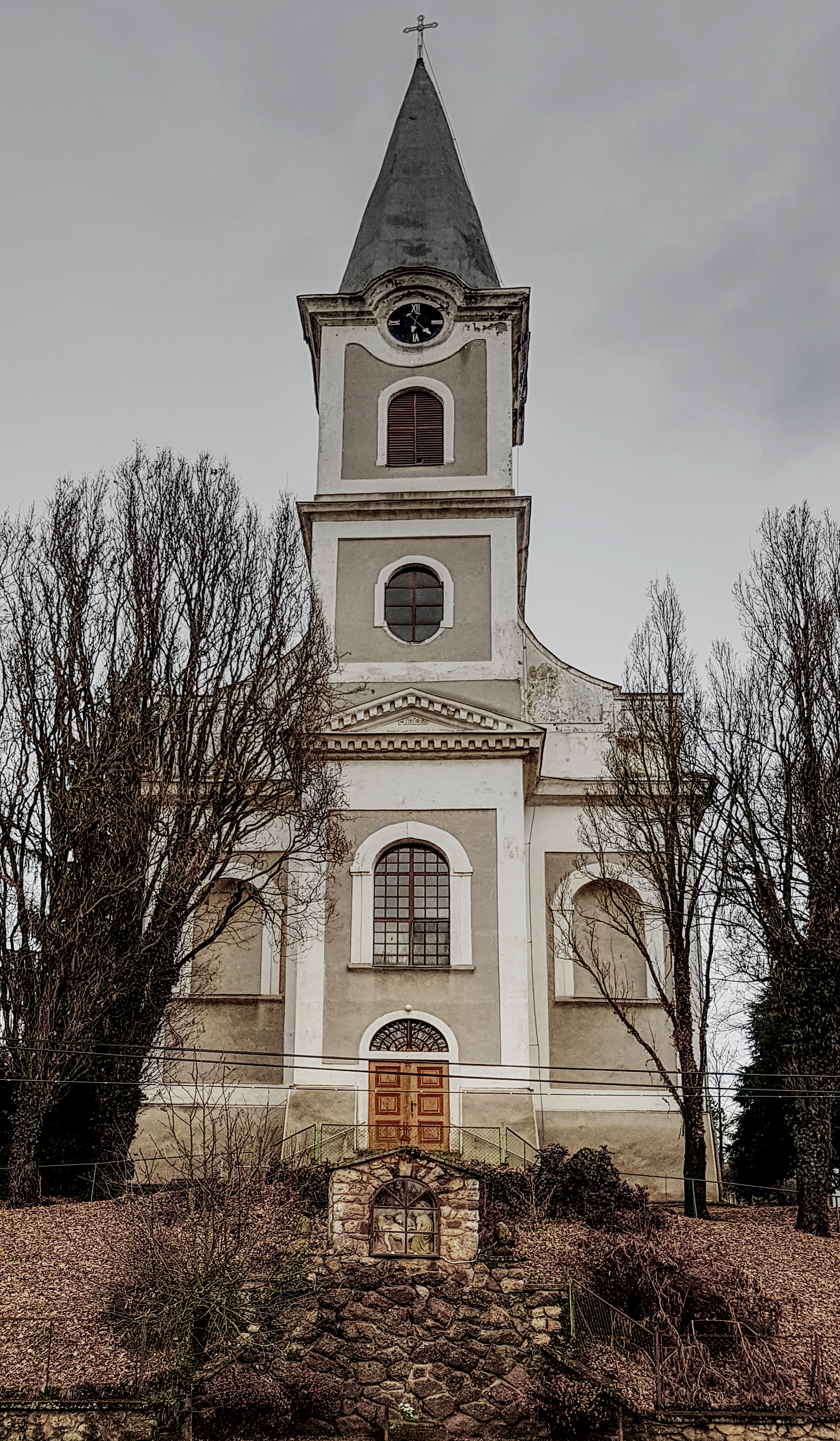
- Görcsöny, Roman Catholic church

- Flag Coat of arms
- Interactive map of Görcsöny
- Coordinates: 45°58′N 18°08′E
- Country: Hungary
- County: Baranya

Population (2015)
  - Total: 1,539
- Time zone: UTC+1 (CET)
  - Summer (DST): UTC+2 (CEST)

Görcsöny is a village in Baranya county, Hungary. It was property of the Benyovszky family from the Middle Ages until 1945. Benyovszky Castle (kastely) is located near the village.
