= Bükkösd =

- Village
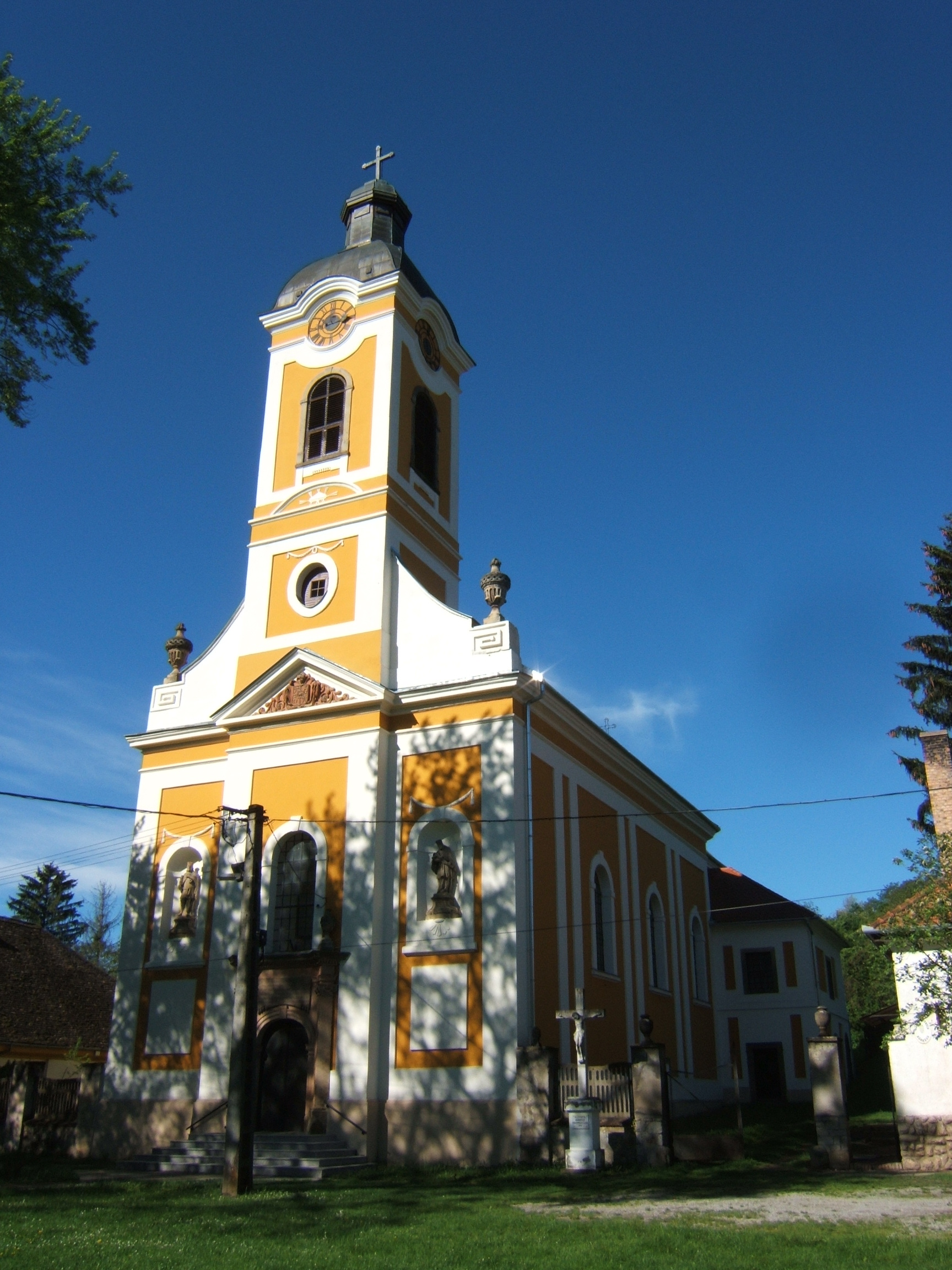
- Bükkösd, templom

- Seal
- Interactive map of Bükkösd
- Coordinates: 46°06′N 17°59′E
- Country: Hungary
- County: Baranya
- Time zone: UTC+1 (CET)
  - Summer (DST): UTC+2 (CEST)

Bükkösd (German: Wickisch) is a village in Baranya county, Hungary.
