= Zók =

- Village (Falva)
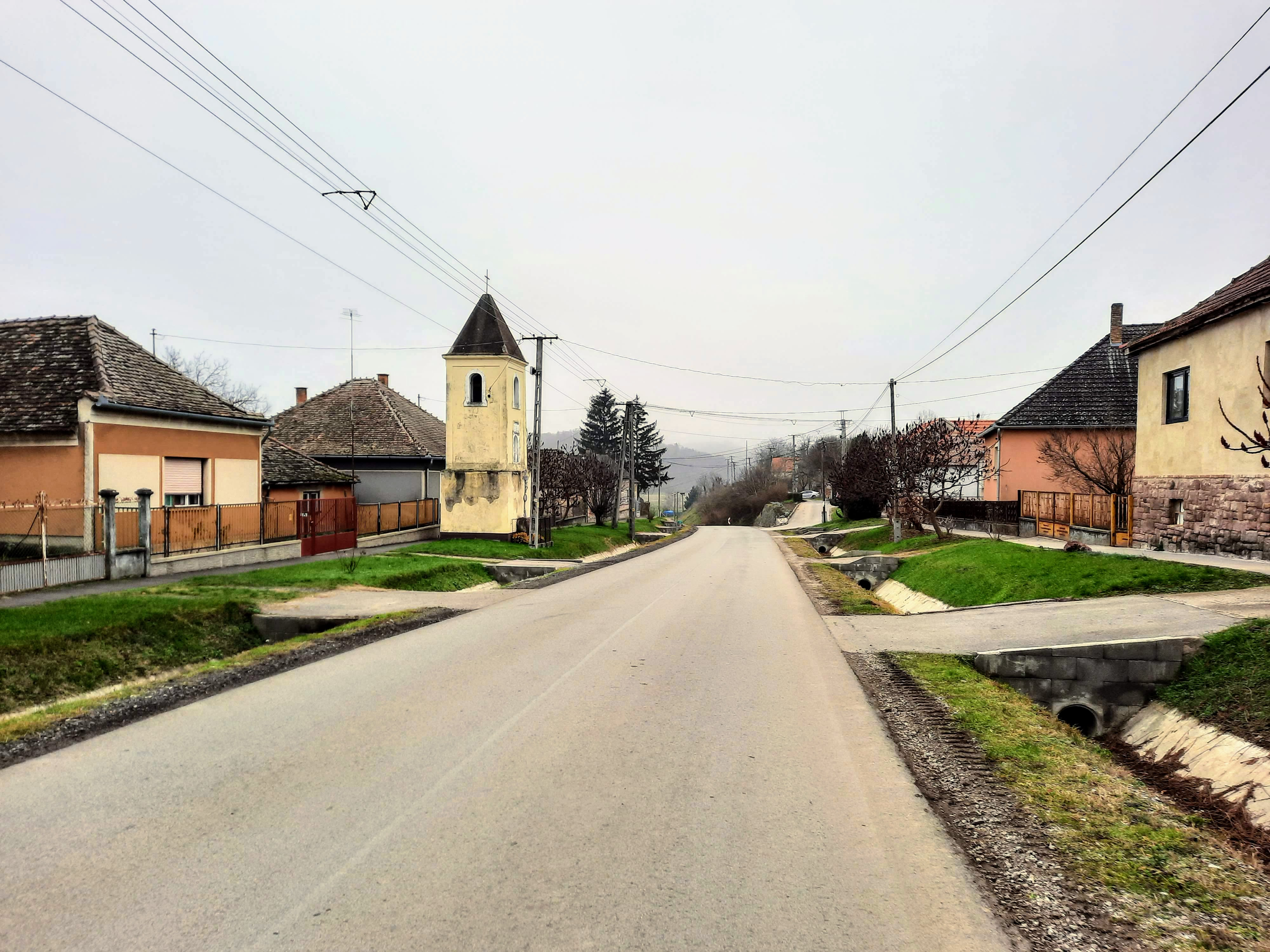
- János Arany Street in Zók, 2020.

- Location of Baranya county in Hungary

- Location of Zók
- Coordinates: 46.00970°N 18.09746°E
- Country: Hungary
- County: Baranya

Area
  - Total: 8.93 km^{2} (3.45 sq mi)

Population (2004)
  - Total: 297
  - Density: 33.25/km^{2} (86.1/sq mi)
- Time zone: UTC+1 (CET)
  - Summer (DST): UTC+2 (CEST)
- Postal code: 7671
- Area code: 73

Zók (Croatian: Zuka) is a village in Baranya county, Hungary.
