= Bicsérd =

- Village
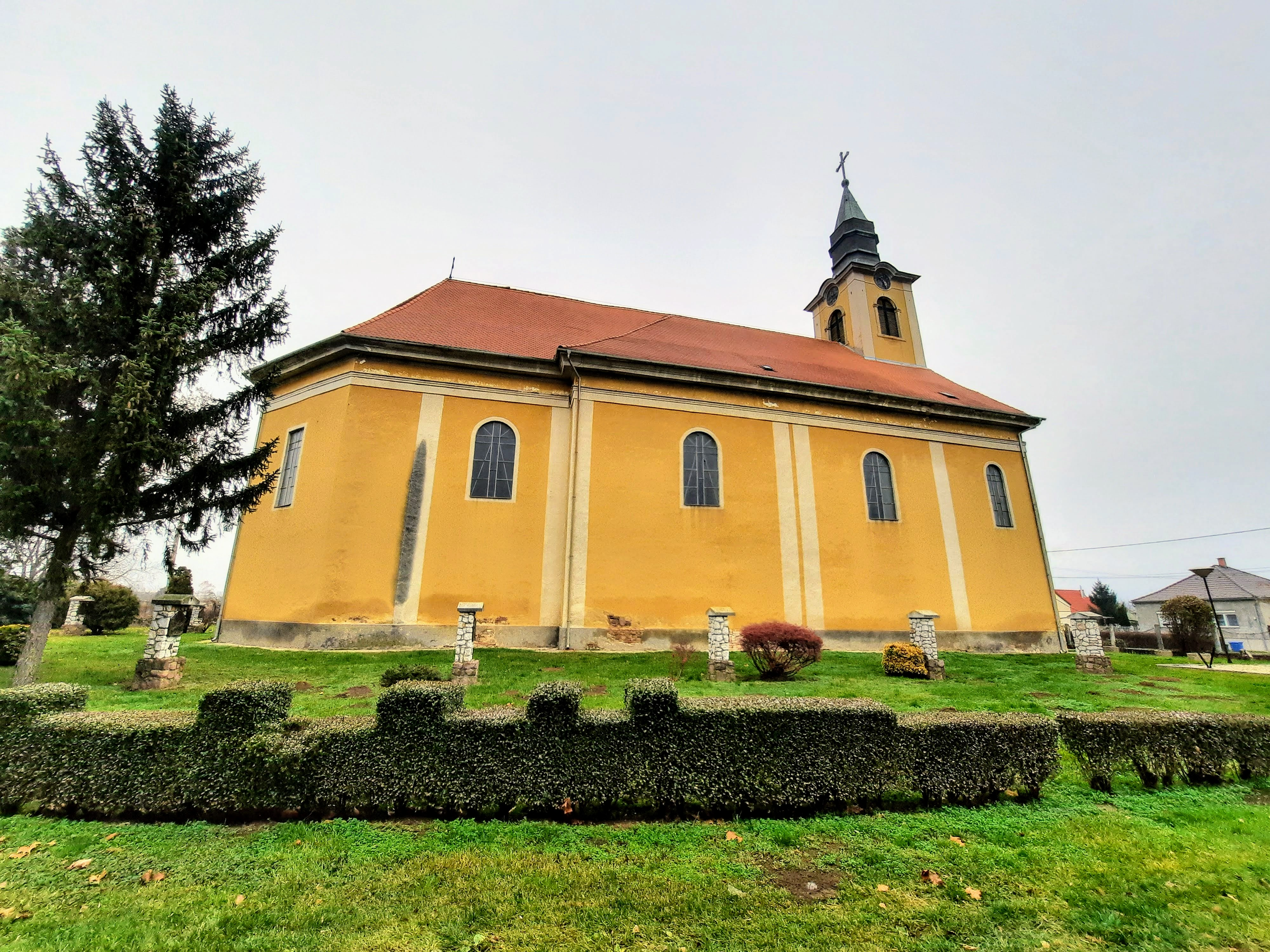
- Bicsérd, római katolikus templom

- Flag Coat of arms
- Interactive map of Bicsérd
- Coordinates: 46°01′N 18°05′E
- Country: Hungary
- County: Baranya
- Time zone: UTC+1 (CET)
  - Summer (DST): UTC+2 (CEST)

Bicsérd is a village in Baranya county, in southern Hungary.
