= Gerde, Hungary =

Gerde
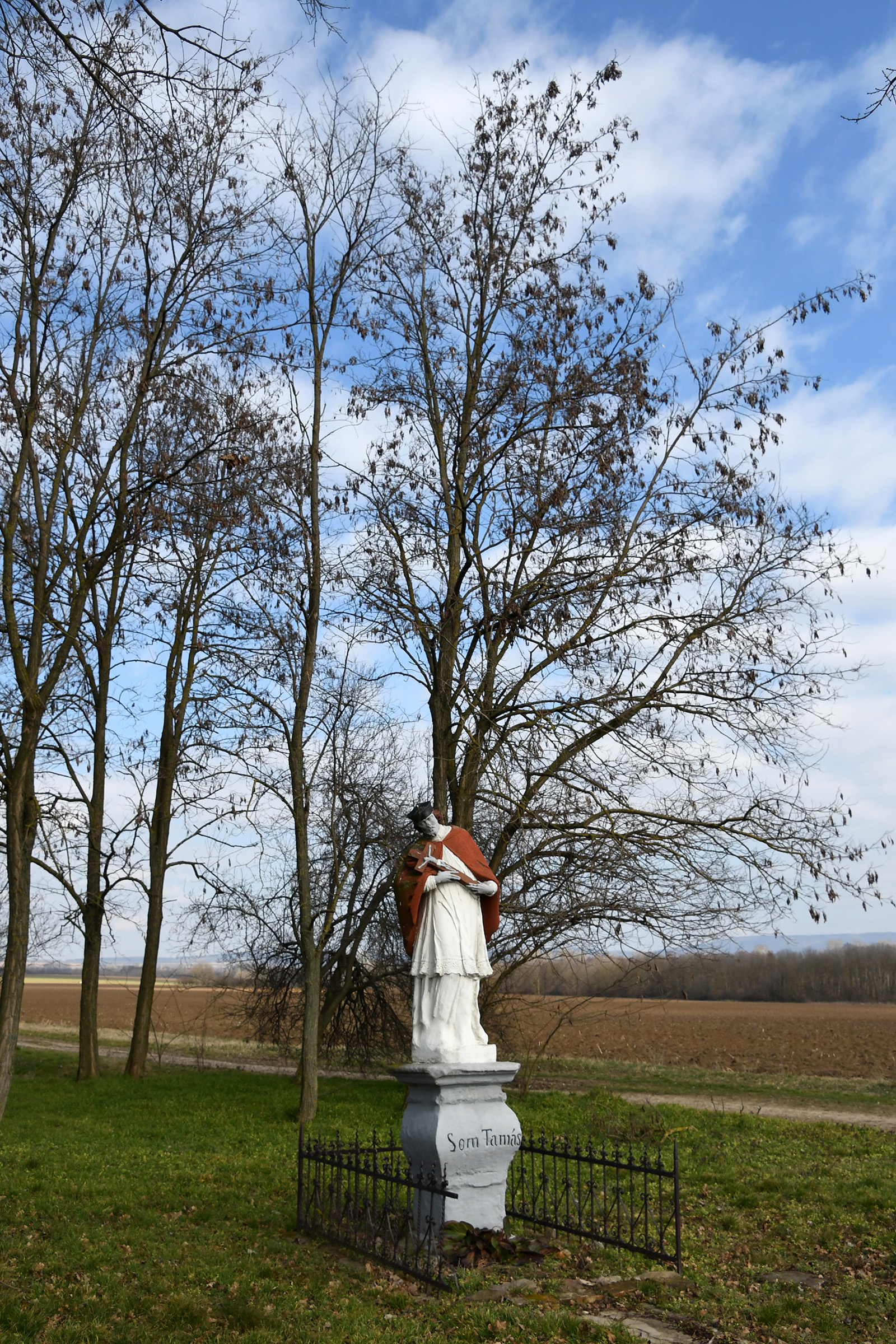

- Location of Baranya county in Hungary

- Location of Gerde
- Coordinates: 45.98978°N 18.02393°E
- Country: Hungary
- County: Baranya

Area
  - Total: 12.76 km^{2} (4.93 sq mi)

Population (2004)
  - Total: 589
  - Density: 46.15/km^{2} (119.5/sq mi)
- Time zone: UTC+1 (CET)
  - Summer (DST): UTC+2 (CEST)
- Postal code: 7951
- Area code: 73

Gerde (Croatian: Gredara) is a village in Baranya county, Hungary.
