= Pellérd =

- Village
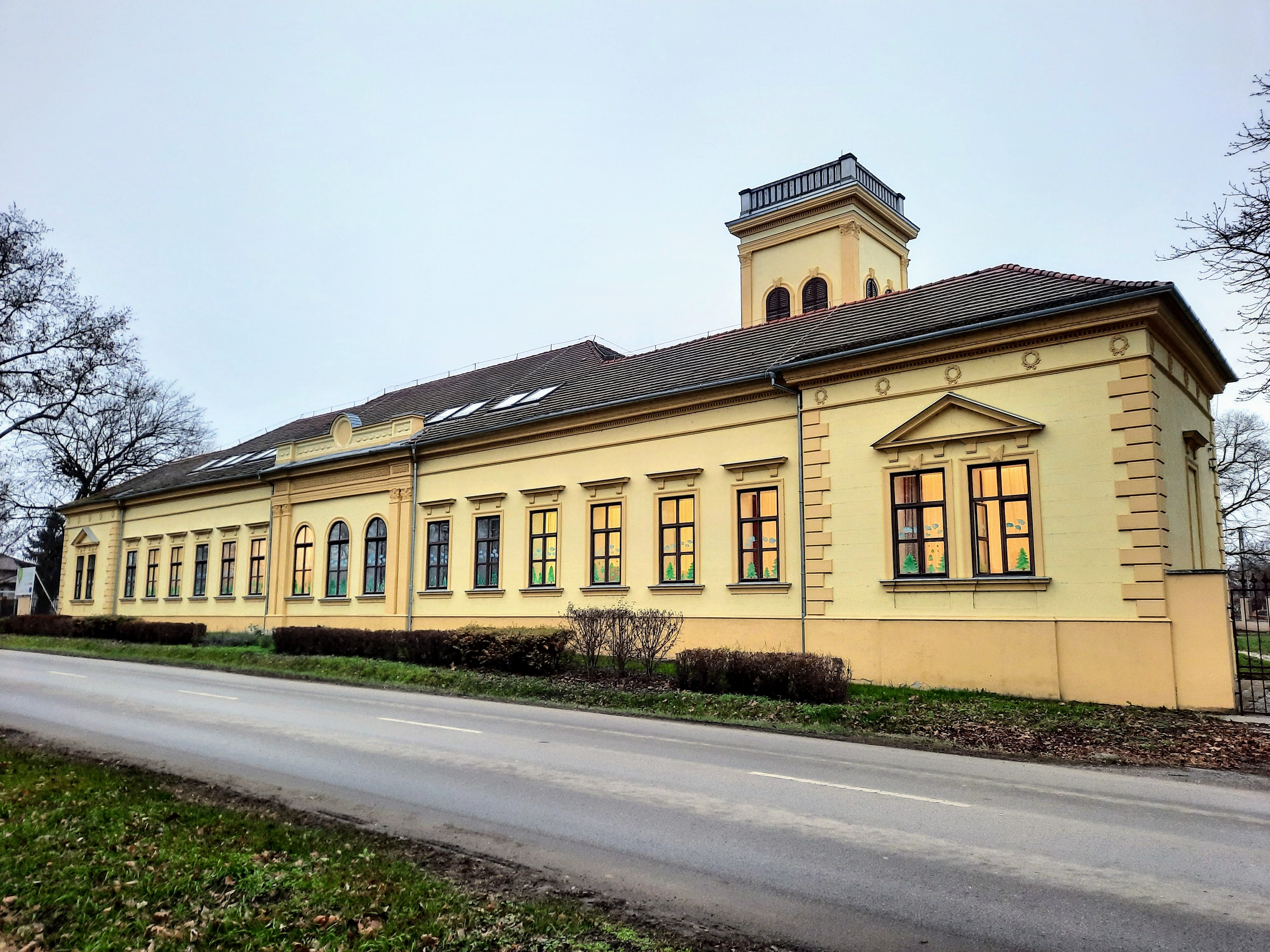
- Interactive map of Pellérd
- Coordinates: 46°02′N 18°09′E
- Country: Hungary
- County: Baranya

Population (2025)
  - Total: 2,336
- Time zone: UTC+1 (CET)
  - Summer (DST): UTC+2 (CEST)

Pellérd is a village in Baranya county, Hungary.
