= Sósvertike =

- Village (Falva)
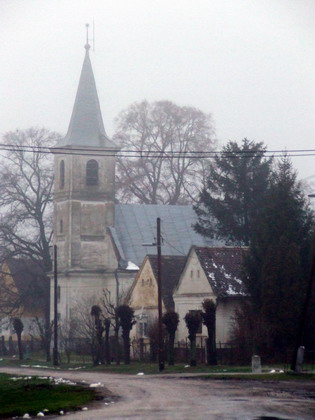
- Interactive map of Sósvertike
- Coordinates: 45°50′N 17°52′E
- Country: Hungary
- County: Baranya

Population (2025)
  - Total: 145
- Time zone: UTC+1 (CET)
  - Summer (DST): UTC+2 (CEST)

Sósvertike is a village in Baranya county, Hungary.
