= Szellő =

- Village (Falva)
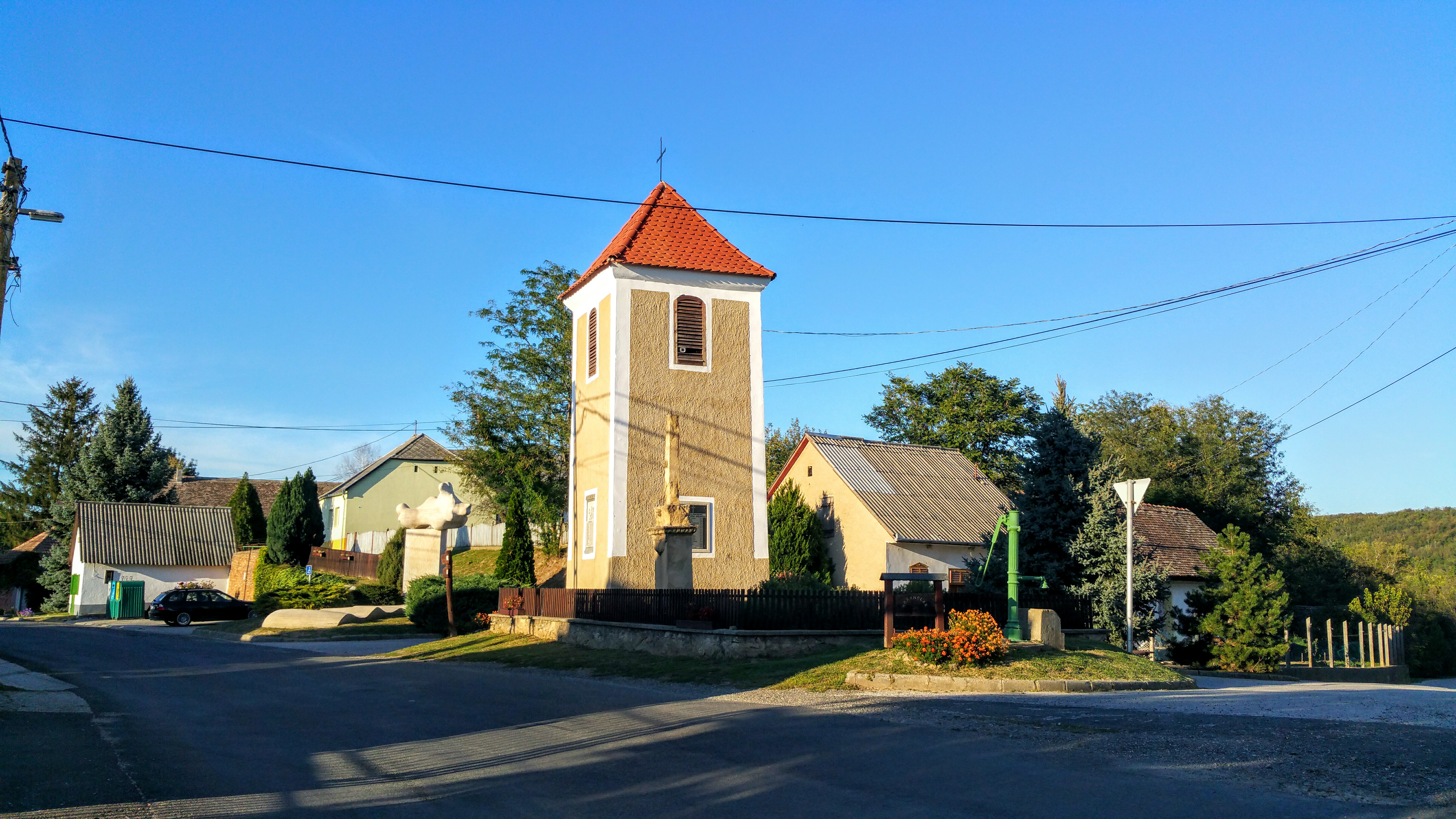
- A street view of Szellő.

- Flag Coat of arms

- Location of Szellő.
- Coordinates: 46°04′N 18°28′E
- Country: Hungary
- County: Baranya

Government
  - Mayor: Wesz Józsefné (Ind.)

Area
  - Total: 5.96 km^{2} (2.30 sq mi)

Population (2024)
  - Total: 106
  - Density: 17.8/km^{2} (46.1/sq mi)
- Time zone: UTC+1 (CET)
  - Summer (DST): UTC+2 (CEST)
- Postal code: 7661
- Area code: 69
- Website: www.szello.hu

Szellő (Croatian: Seluv) is a village in Baranya county, Pécsvárad District, Hungary.

== Surroundings ==
It is located south of Pécsvárad, next to the Karasica River. Neighboring settlements include Erzsébet (to the north), Kékesd (to the northeast), Maráza to the east, Liptód to the southeast, Máriakéménd to the south, and Kátoly to the southwest.

Szellő lies on Hungarian road 5608 between Szederkény and Pécsvárad.

== History ==
Szellő and its surroundings were already inhabited by the time of the Avar Khaganate, in the 6th century AD. The town was mentioned for the first time in a tithe list in 1291. The village was one of the stops on the wine trading route between Pécs and Pécsvárad. The village was founded next to the Karasica, but later moved to higher ground due to flooding.

The town continued under the Ottomans in the 16th century, although lost population. In the 18th century, German settlers arrived in the dwindling settlement, and the development of the village was boosted by their advanced agricultural techniques.

In the 1910 census, the settlement had 417 inhabitants. Of these, 246 were Hungarians, 171 were Germans, of which 410 were Roman Catholics and 6 were Jewish. During the Czechoslovak–Hungarian population exchange of 1945, some townspeople were displaced by Hungarians from Slovakia.

== Demography ==
Historical population
| Year | Pop. | ±% |
|---|---|---|
| 2001 | 173 | — |
| 2008 | 160 | −7.5% |
| 2013 | 136 | −15.0% |
| 2014 | 133 | −2.2% |
| 2015 | 137 | +3.0% |
| 2019 | 138 | +0.7% |
| 2021 | 130 | −5.8% |
| 2022 | 113 | −13.1% |
| 2023 | 106 | −6.2% |
| 2024 | 106 | +0.0% |

During the 2011 census, 97.7% of residents identified themselves as Hungarian, 0.8% as Gypsy, 4.7% as German, and 1.6% as Ukrainian. The religious distribution was as follows: Roman Catholic 54.7%, Reformed 3.1%, Lutheran 3.9%, Greek Catholic 0.8%, non-denominational 14.8% (21.9% did not declare).

In 2022, 87.6% of the population identified themselves as Hungarian, 2.7% as German, 0.9% as Gypsy, 0.9% as Croatian, and 2.7% as other, non-national nationalities. According to their religion, 37.2% were Roman Catholic, 3.5% Reformed, 3.5% Lutheran, 0.9% other Christian, 0.9% other Catholic, 11.5% non-denominational.

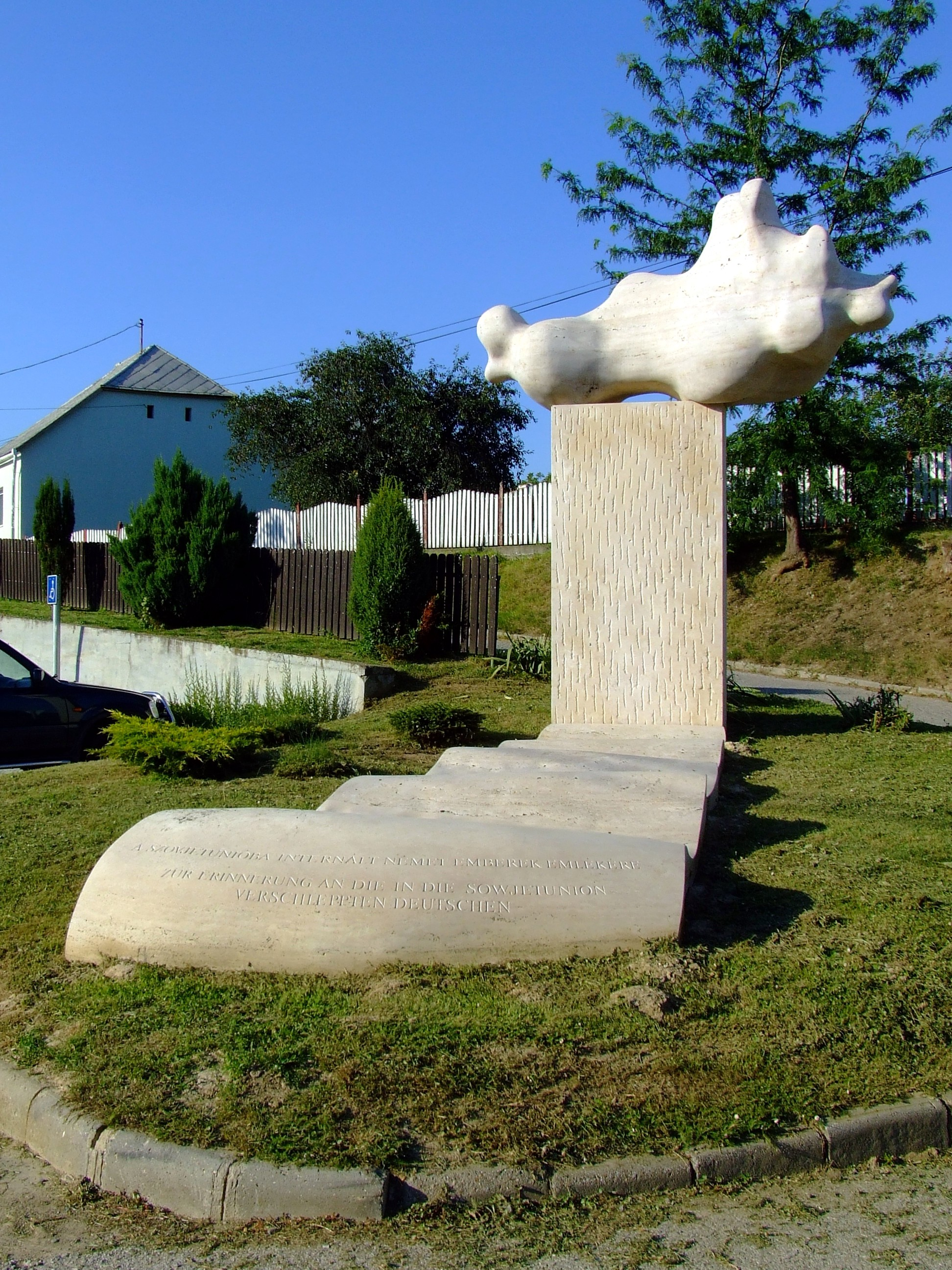
A monument to German people interned in the Soviet Union

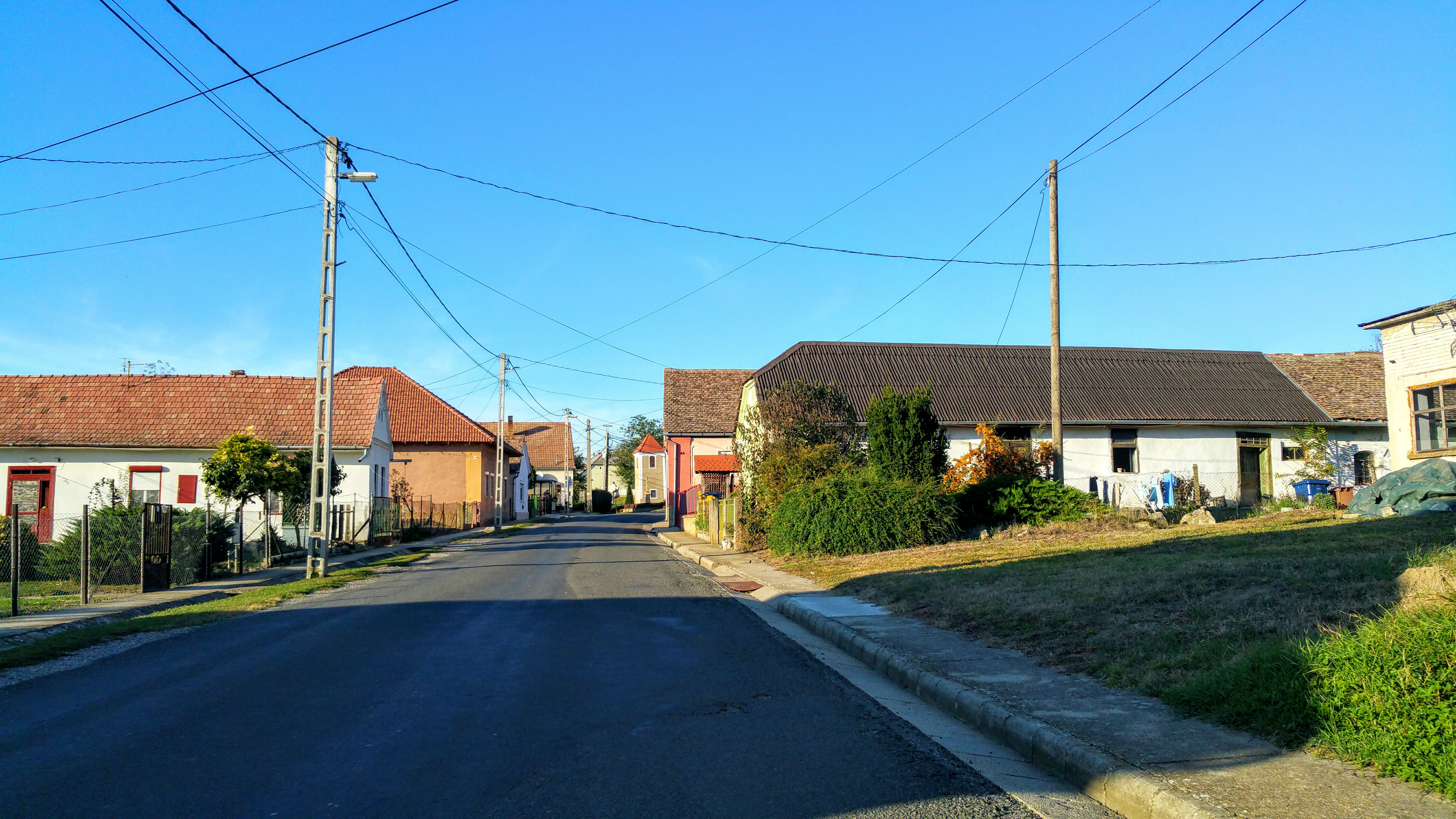
Street detail
