= Pécsvárad District =

Coordinates: 46.158879793638114°N 18.419464464940997°E

Pécsvárad District Pécsváradi járás
- Districts of Hungary
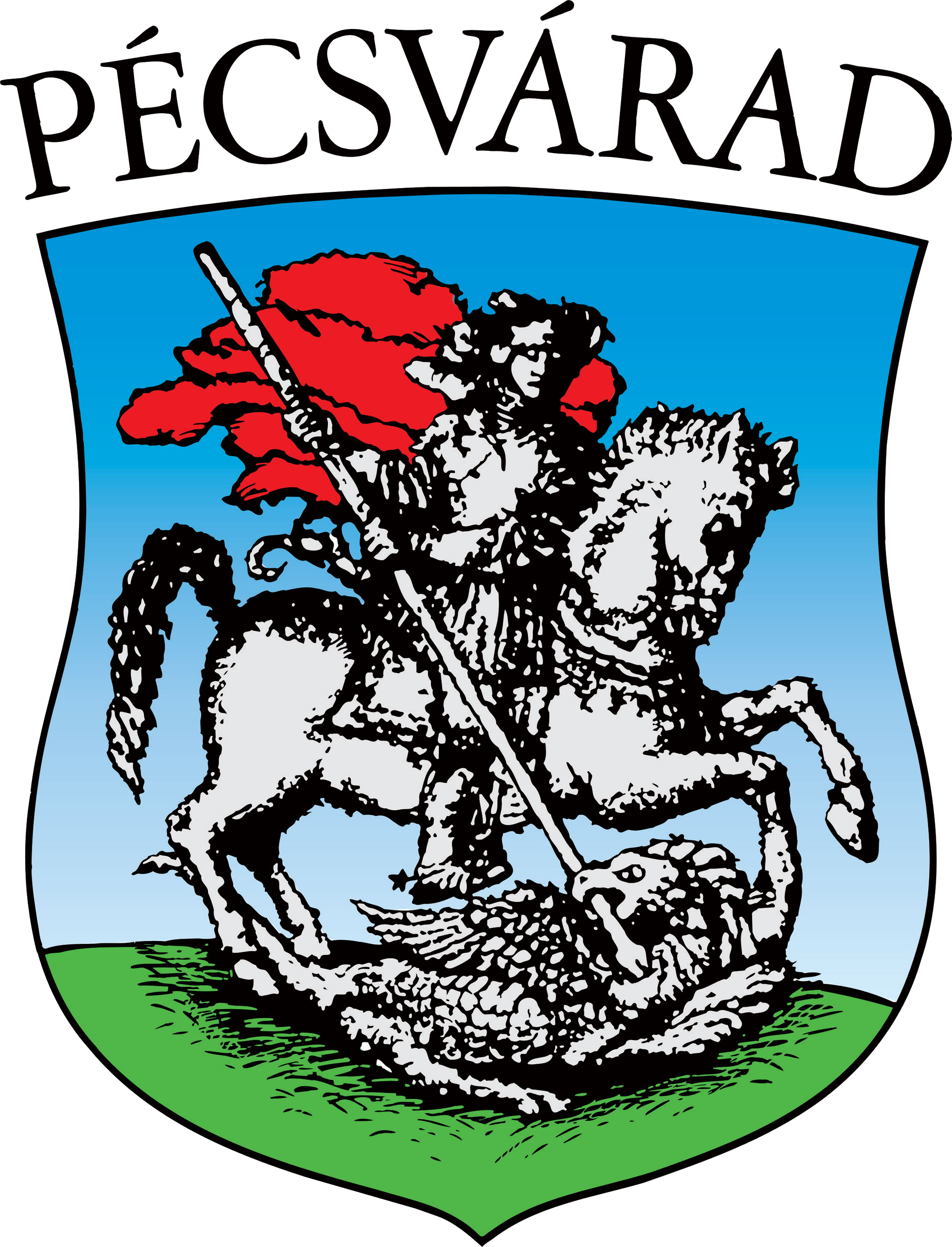
- Coat of arms

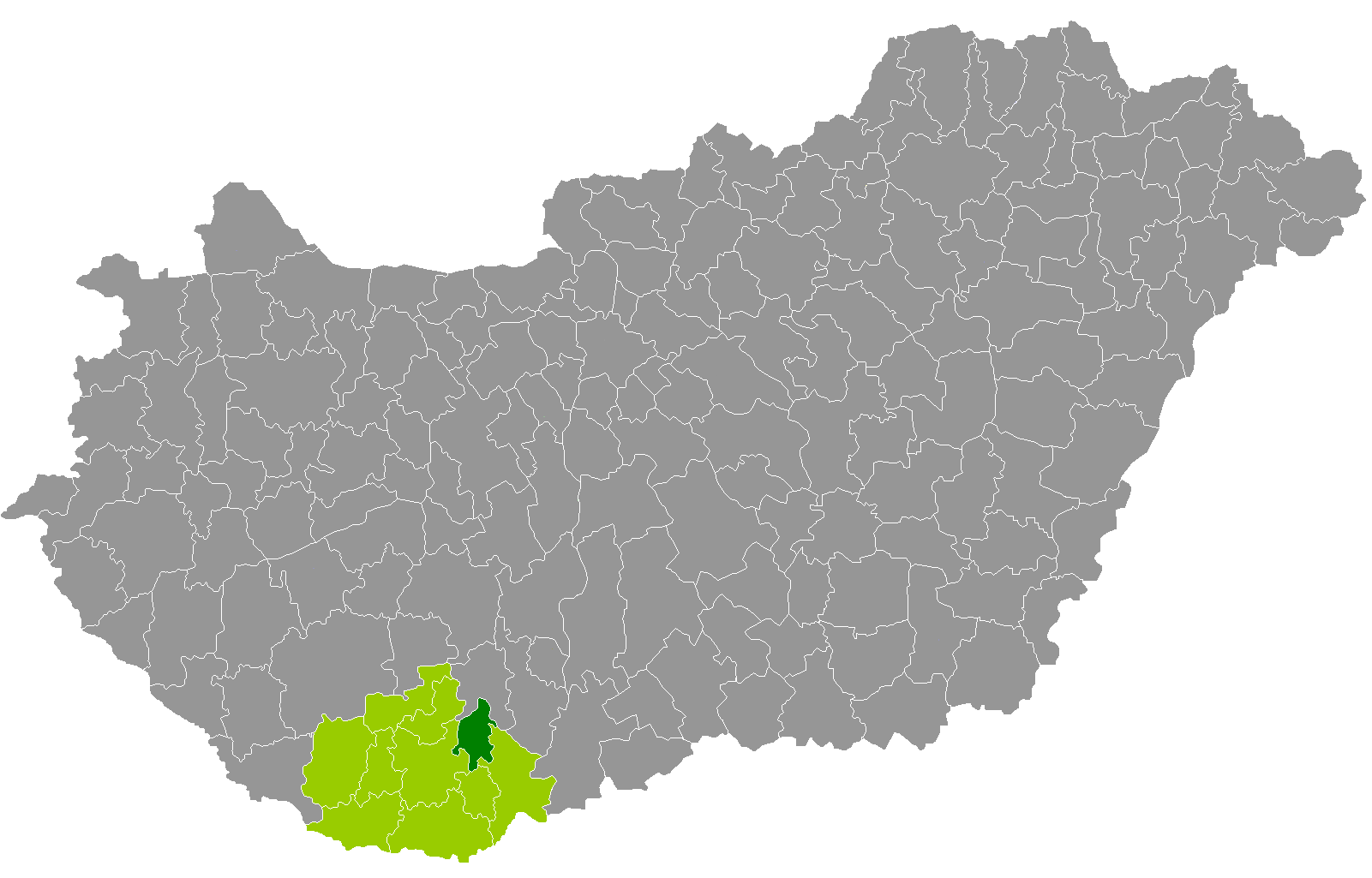
- Pécsvárad District within Hungary and Baranya County.
- Country: Hungary
- County: Baranya
- District seat: Pécsvárad

Area
  - Total: 246.44 km^{2} (95.15 sq mi)
  - Rank: 9th in Baranya

Population (2011 census)
  - Total: 11,931
  - Rank: 10th in Baranya
  - Density: 48/km^{2} (120/sq mi)

Pécsvárad (Hungarian: Pécsváradi járás) is a district in north-eastern part of Baranya County, Hungary. Pécsvárad is also the name of the town where the district seat is situated. The district is in the Southern Transdanubia Statistical Region.

== Geography ==
Pécsvárad District borders with Bonyhád District (Tolna County) to the north, Mohács District to the east, the Bóly District to the south, Pécs District to the west. The number of the inhabited places in Pécsvárad District is 17.

== Municipalities ==
The district has 1 town and 16 villages. (ordered by population, as of 1 January 2012)

- Apátvarasd (134)
- Erdősmecske (368)
- Erzsébet (301)
- Fazekasboda (203)
- Geresdlak (771)
- Hidas (2,017)
- Kátoly (290)
- Kékesd (175)
- Lovászhetény (268)
- Martonfa (205)
- Mecseknádasd (1,509)
- Nagypall (425)
- Óbánya (129)
- Ófalu (324)
- **Pécsvárad** (4,022) – district seat
- Szellő (135)
- Zengővárkony (414)

The bolded municipality is city.

== See also ==
- List of cities and towns in Hungary
