= Bárányles =

Southern Hungarian tradition

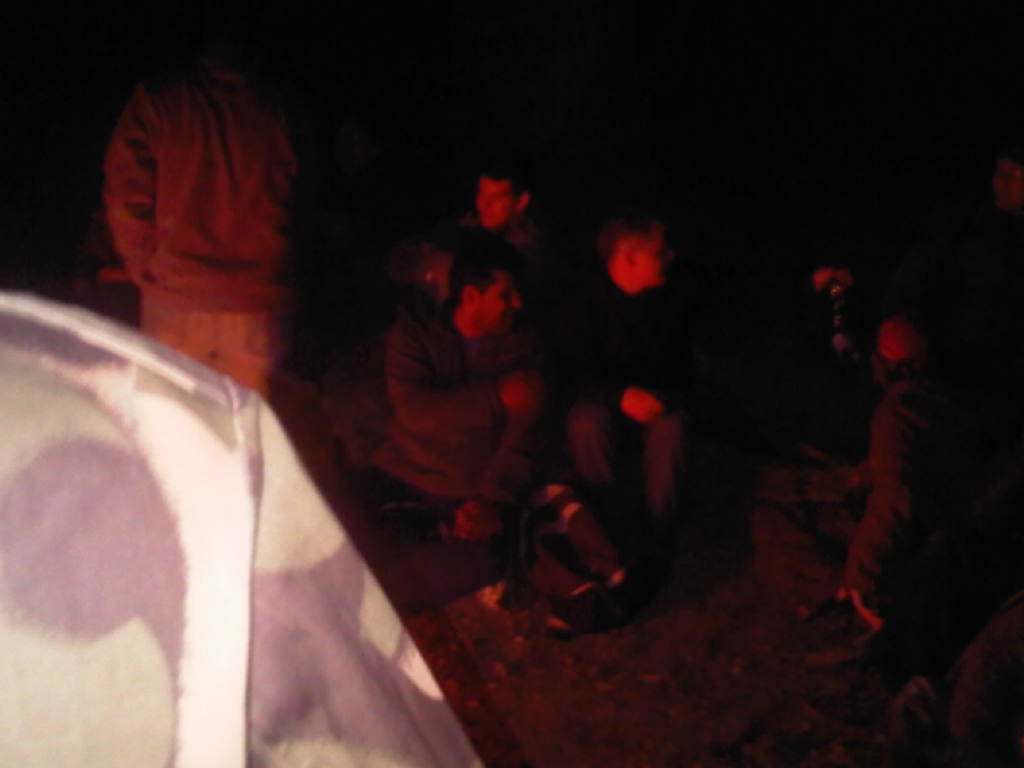
At the fire, April 24, 2011, 3.00 a.m.

The bárányles ('vigil of the lamb') is a local tradition in the southern Hungarian village Hosszúhetény and around the Zengő mountain, a night pilgrimage on Easter Sunday, in which only males can take part.

The participants set out from the feet of the Zengő to reach a cross (Hungarian kereszt) called the "Bocz-kereszt" by locals before dawn. They sit, drink, and talk at a fire near the cross until dawn when they surround the cross and briefly pray to welcome the arrival of daylight, or "the Lamb", Jesus Christ.

== Roots ==
The explanation to the tradition has several layers.

According to the local tale, an ancestor of a populous local family, the Boczs crossed the Mecsek mountains more than two hundred years ago, coming from Györe, to visit his love in Hosszúhetény. In a snow storm he lost his way on the mountain. He was near freezing to death when Jesus came in the disguise of a lamb and showed him the way down the mountain, saving his life. In gratitude, the Bocz family erected a cross there and locals visit the place every year to remember the miracle - the tale says.

Recent research found that the cross was erected much later, in 1876, with donation from a miller in Püspökszentlászló village at the feet of the mountain, who wanted to express his gratitude in this form for the escape of his little daughter from a flash flood.

The cross was renovated in 1918 by a member of the Bocz family and his wife - as an inscription below the cross still shows - to thank God for the safe return of the man from the battles of World War I. Former local soldiers of the Great War started the tradition of visiting the cross annually. The tradition was kept alive by World War II survivors and then their descendants.
