= Hosszúhetény =

Hosszúhetény _{Hetting/Heting/Langheting}
- Location of Hosszúhetény
- Coordinates: 46.16331°N 18.35135°E
- Country: Hungary
- County: Baranya

Area
  - Total: 45.27 km^{2} (17.48 sq mi)

Population (2001)
  - Total: 3,360
  - Density: 74.22/km^{2} (192.2/sq mi)
- Time zone: UTC+1 (CET)
  - Summer (DST): UTC+2 (CEST)
- Postal code: 7694
- Area code: 72

Hosszúhetény (Croatian: Hetinj, Etinj, Hetin, Jetin, German: Hetting, Heting, Langheting) is the most populous village in Baranya county, southwest Hungary, a significant centre of village tourism. It is located 18 kilometres northeast to Pécs, the county capital, in a valley between the feet of Zengő, the highest peak of the Mecsek mountains and the peak called Hármashegy.

It has a population of 3424 (as of 1 January 2010) and an area of 45.27 km^{2} (17 sq mi).

The valley has been inhabited since the Stone Age. Two other nearby villages belong to the administration of Hosszúhetény: Püspökszentlászló and Kisújbánya.

Located in an environmentally protected area, a special microclimate producing rare flower species like Paeonia officinalis ssp, among picturesque mountains, the three villages are popular among tourists who arrive from all parts of Hungary and abroad. One of the main sites is the arboretum of the episcopal castle in Püspökszentlászló.

Tourism gives an increasing portion of the villagers' revenues after the decline of coal mining which flourished in the region between the 1950s and 1990.

== Geography ==
Between Hosszúhetény and Komló is the Takanyó Valley.

== NATO radar ==
In the 2000s the Hungarian government wanted to build a NATO radar station on the top of the Zengő, but the plan foundered in 2005 on fierce resistance from the inhabitants of Hosszúhetény and nearby Pécsvárad and environmentalist groups including Greenpeace.

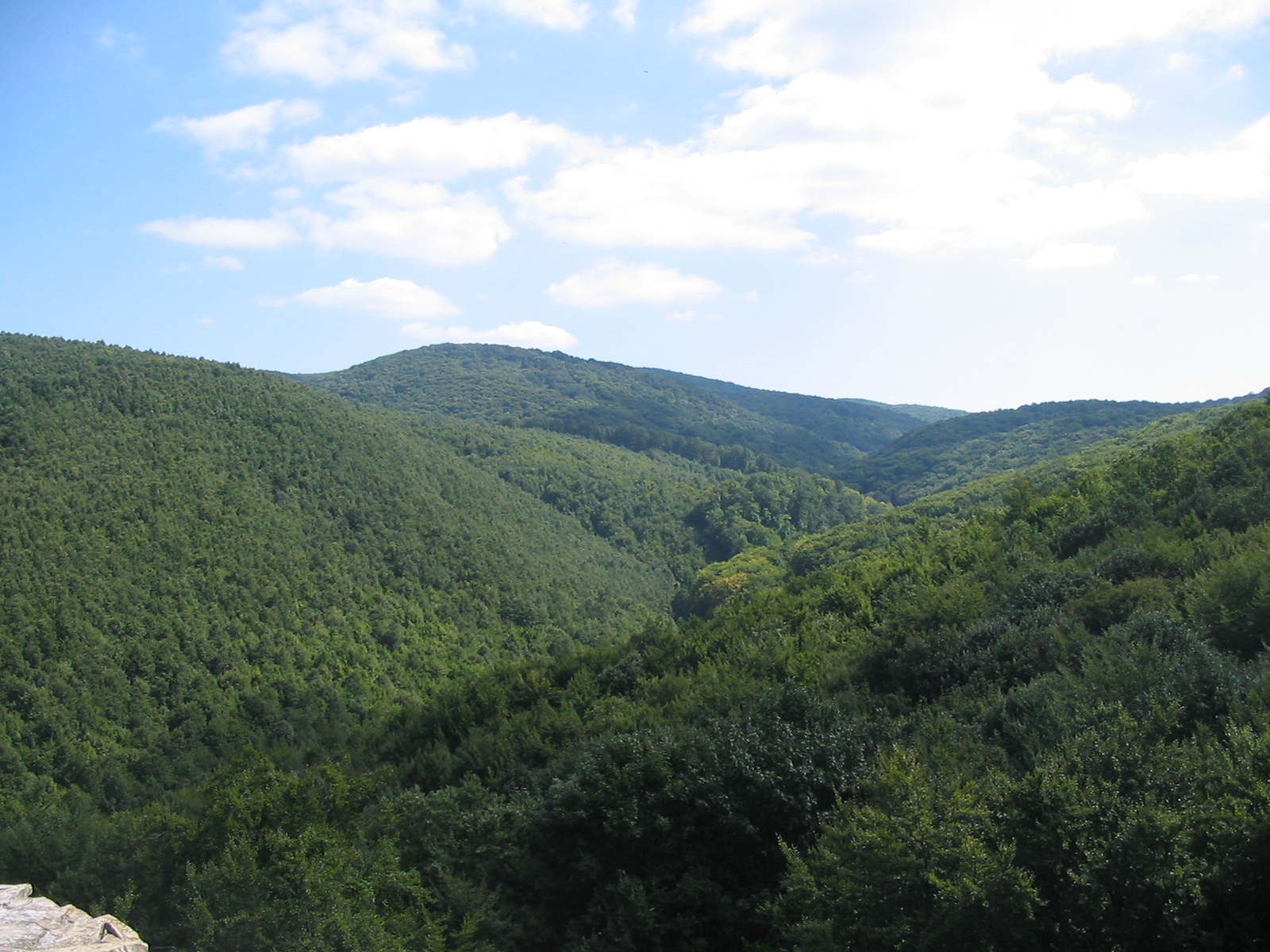
The eastern Mecsek mountains

== People ==
- Bertalan Andrásfalvy, politician, ethnographer
- Gyula Bocz, sculptor
- Alajos Degré, jurist
- Mária Fischer, writer
- Károly Hetényi Varga, writer

== International relations ==
=== Twin towns — Sister cities ===
Hosszúhetény is twinned with:

- Morolo, Italy
- Hetin (Hungarian: Tamásfalva), Serbia
- Săvădisla (Hungarian: Tordaszentlászló), Romania
- Alfdorf, Germany

== See also ==
- Bárányles
- Wheelbarrow Olympics
