= Wheelbarrow Olympics =

Annual sports event in Hungary

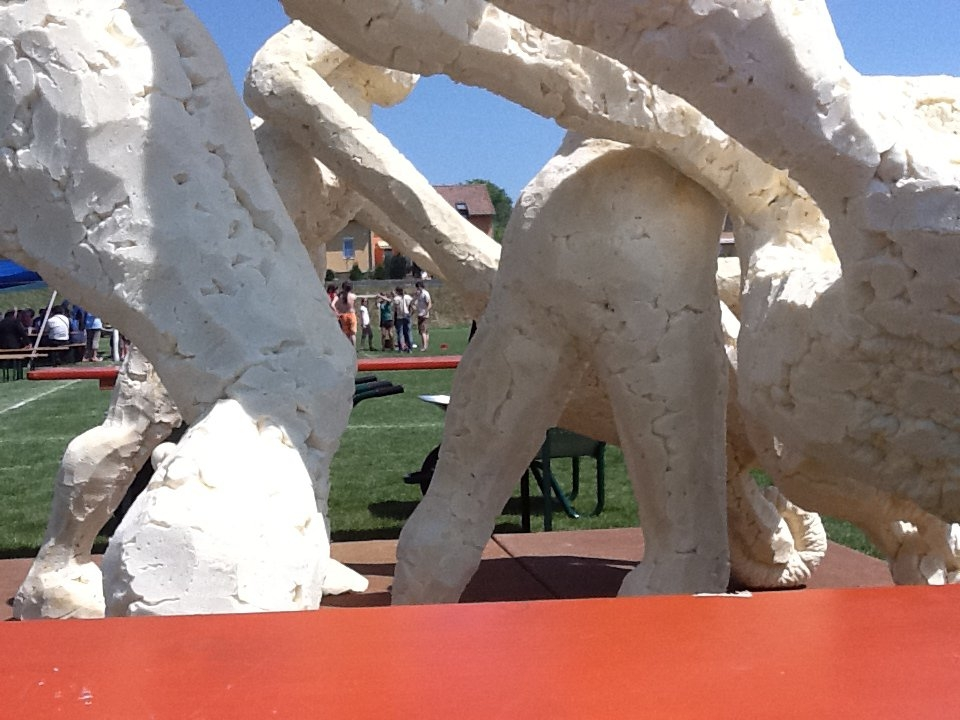
Site of the 2011 games, through Ghenadie Popescu's wheelbarrow sculpture.

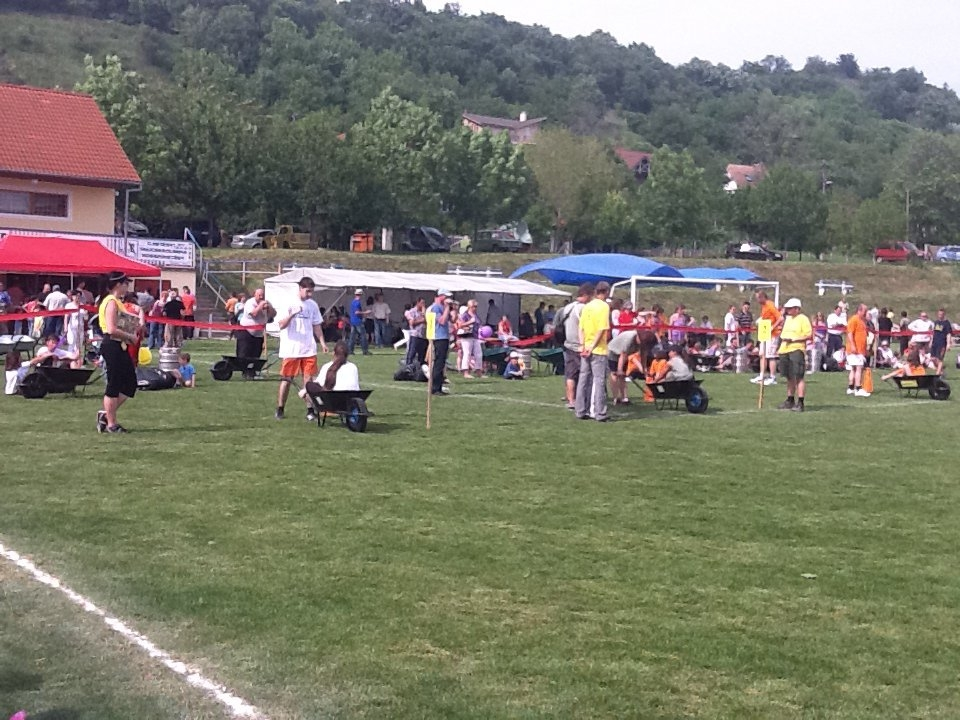
Girls have taken their place in the wheelbarrows as teams prepare for the race at the 11. games in 2011

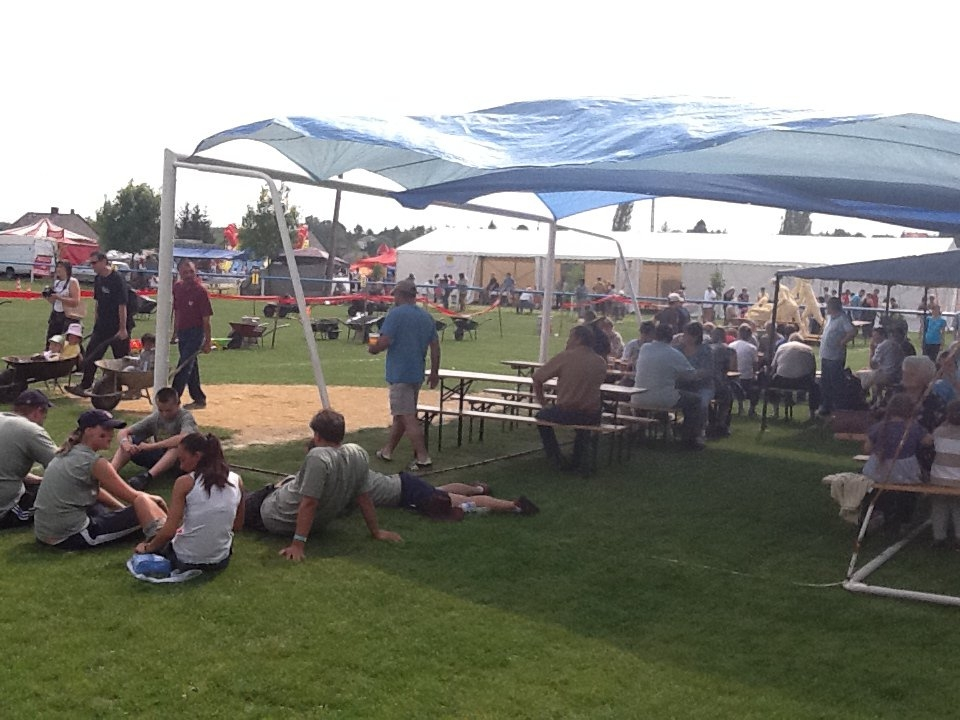
Relaxing between two races, 2011.

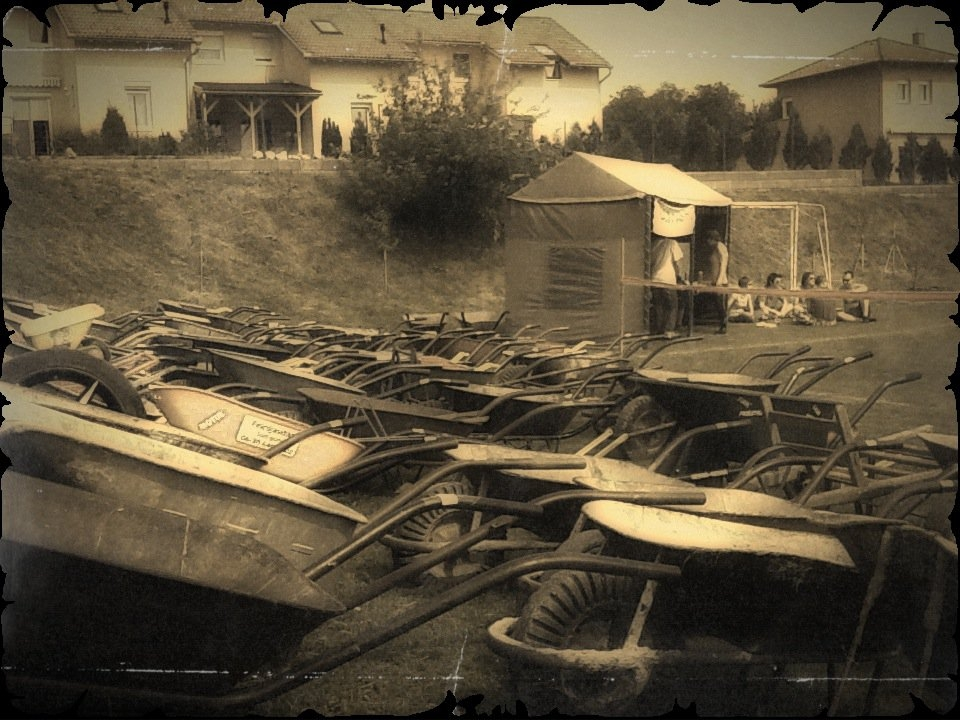
Rows of wheelbarrows used in a march following the 2011 games.

The Wheelbarrow Olympics (in Hungarian Talicskaolimpia) is an international sports event organized annually in Hosszúhetény village in Baranya county, Hungary. The participants compete individually and in teams, in several categories: solo, double, triple, sandwich and in speed and skill exercises.

Foreign participants of the games have been from Croatia, Denmark, Germany, Italy, Romania, Serbia, Slovakia and South Korea. The games are linked with cultural programmes including concerts and dance performances. The side events are Rocktalicska with the concerts of young rock bands and Folktalicska, with folk music and dance performances.

The XV. Wheelbarrow Olympics was held on 11–13 June 2015.
