= Komló =

- Town
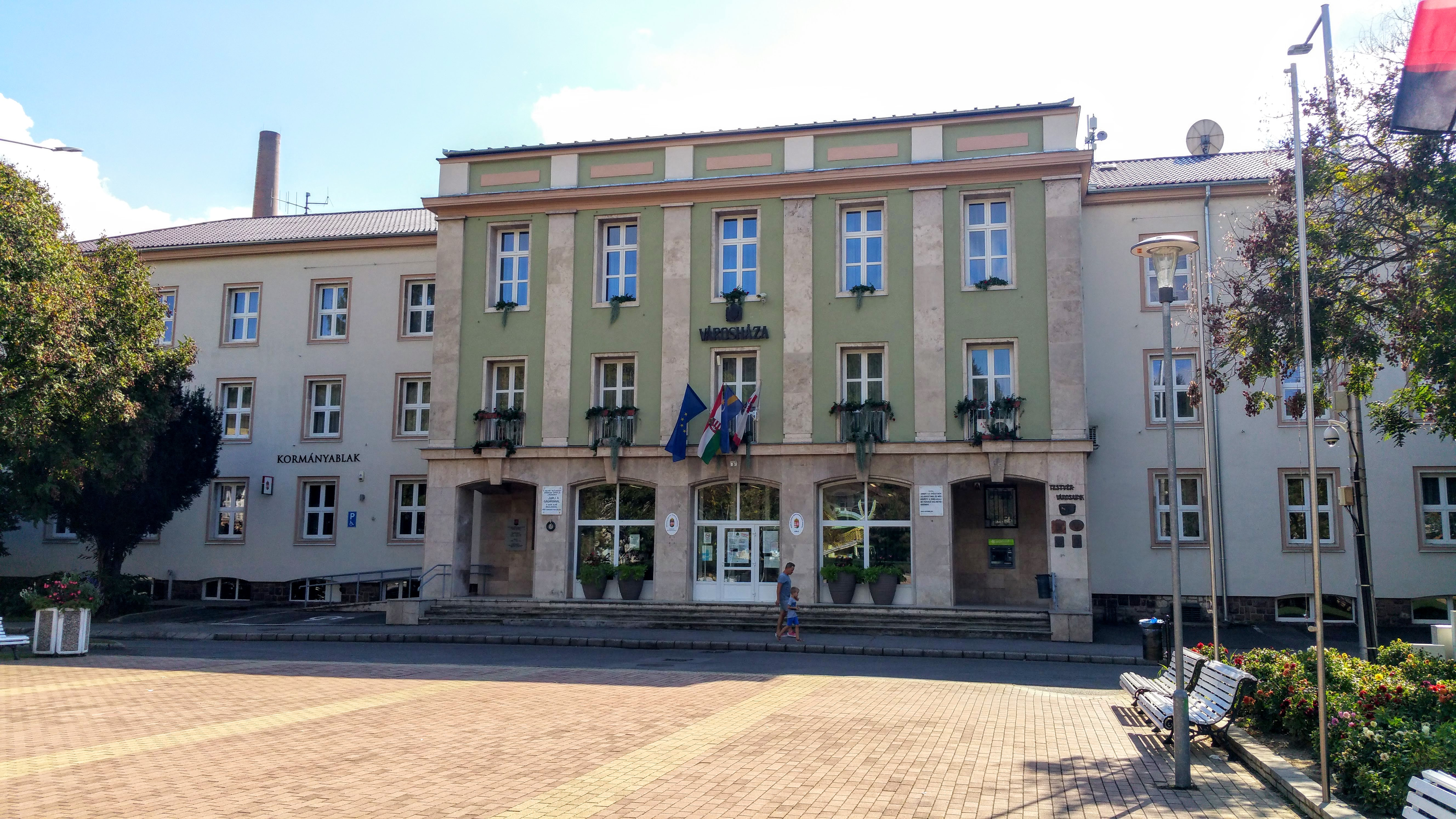
- Town hall in Komló

- Flag Coat of arms

- Location of Komló
- Coordinates: 46.19119°N 18.26126°E
- Country: Hungary
- County: Baranya
- District: Komló

Area
  - Total: 46.55 km^{2} (17.97 sq mi)

Population (2009)
  - Total: 25,881
  - Density: 578.02/km^{2} (1,497.1/sq mi)
- Time zone: UTC+1 (CET)
  - Summer (DST): UTC+2 (CEST)
- Postal code: 7300
- Area code: (+36) 72
- Website: komlo.hu

Komló ([komloː], German: Kumlau, Croatian: Komlov) is a town in Baranya county, Hungary. The name of the settlement is derived from the local crop of hops (komló), an ingredient of beer. By the 18th century a depiction of this plant running up a support already featured on the herald of the town.

The former village of Komló became a planned mining city during the socialist era. It was the second biggest mining centre in Hungary after Tatabánya.

== History ==
The area was inhabited by the Romans, the ruins of 2nd-century Roman villas were discovered during the laying of foundations for new buildings in the area (Mecsekjánosi, Körtvélyes). The existence of the once village is first mentioned in a charter from 1256 as 'villa Compleov', then part of the estates of the Pécsvárad Abbey.

The small settlements that are part of Komló today were already inhabited during the Árpád Age (Kökönyös (Kwkenyes), Gadány-puszta (Gadan), Keményfalva (Kemefalua), Jánosi (Csépán), Mecsekfalu (Szopok), Kisbattyán (Battyan), Zobákpuszta (Zabaguy) and Sikonda (Sicund)).

Komló was not deserted during the Turkish rule, however the population was very scant. After 1945, Komló was among those settlements whose expansion into a city was a somewhat forced affair directed by political decisions. A determining factor of its development was the role in coal mining. After more than 100 years of operation, mining in the area ceased on 1 January 2000.

== Sightseeing ==
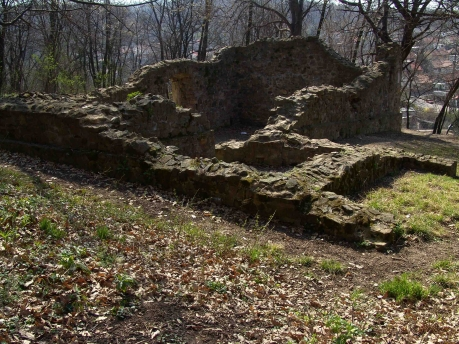
Remains of medieval chapel in Komló

The ruin of Gothic medieval chapel is situated (dates from 13-14th) behind the church of Komló. A graveyard surrounded the chapel at one time. Between the towns of Hosszúhetény and Komló, the Takanyó Valley is present. The Museum of the Local History is settled in the centre of the town (there is an exhibition where one can see the footprints of the Komlosaurus carbonis). Sikonda is a spa resort that belongs to Komló. Its thermal baths was developed around the slightly radioactive and carbonic acid waters discovered in 1928. In 1995, an earlier ruling was confirmed, recognising the therapeutic effects of the thermal waters.

== Demographics ==
As of 2022, the town is 86.7% Hungarian, 3.3% Gypsy, 2.1% German, and 1.8% of non-European origin. The population is 23.4% Roman Catholic, 3.3% Reformed, and 27.6% nondenominational.

== Climate ==
Climate in this area has mild differences between highs and lows, and there is adequate rainfall year-round. The Köppen Climate Classification subtype for this climate is "Cfb" (Marine West Coast Climate/Oceanic climate).

== Sport ==
- Komlói Bányász SK, football team

== Twin towns – sister cities ==
Komló is twinned with:

- Beiuș, Romania
- Éragny, France
- Neckartenzlingen, Germany
- Torrice, Italy
- Valpovo, Croatia
