= Ófalu =

Ófalu Ohwala
- Village
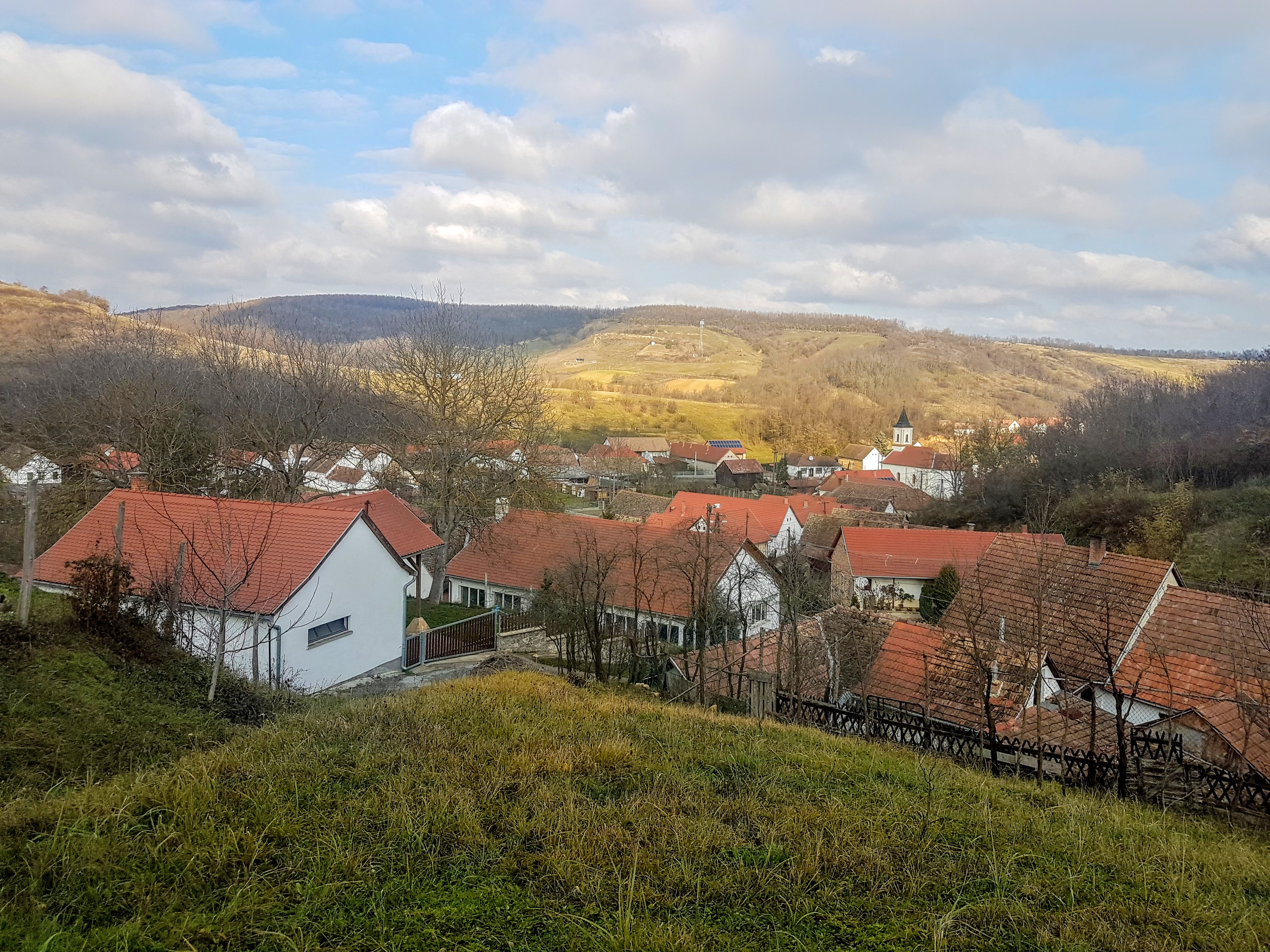
- Interactive map of Ófalu
- Coordinates: 46°13′13″N 18°31′51″E
- Country: Hungary
- County: Baranya
- District: Pécsvárad

Population (2025)
  - Total: 328
- Time zone: UTC+1 (CET)
  - Summer (DST): UTC+2 (CEST)

Ófalu (German: Ohwala) is a village in Pécsvárad District of Baranya County in Hungary. The name literally means "old village".
