= Takanyó Valley =

Valley between Hosszúhetény and Komló, Hungary

Coordinates: 46.2°N 18.3°E

Takanyó Valley is a valley between Hosszúhetény and Komló (Zobákpuszta) at the Northern part of Hármashegy, in the Eastern Mecsek. Mecsek, Hungary.

Spring of Stream Völgység, main watercourse of the Eastern Mecsek is just above the valley.

== Springs ==
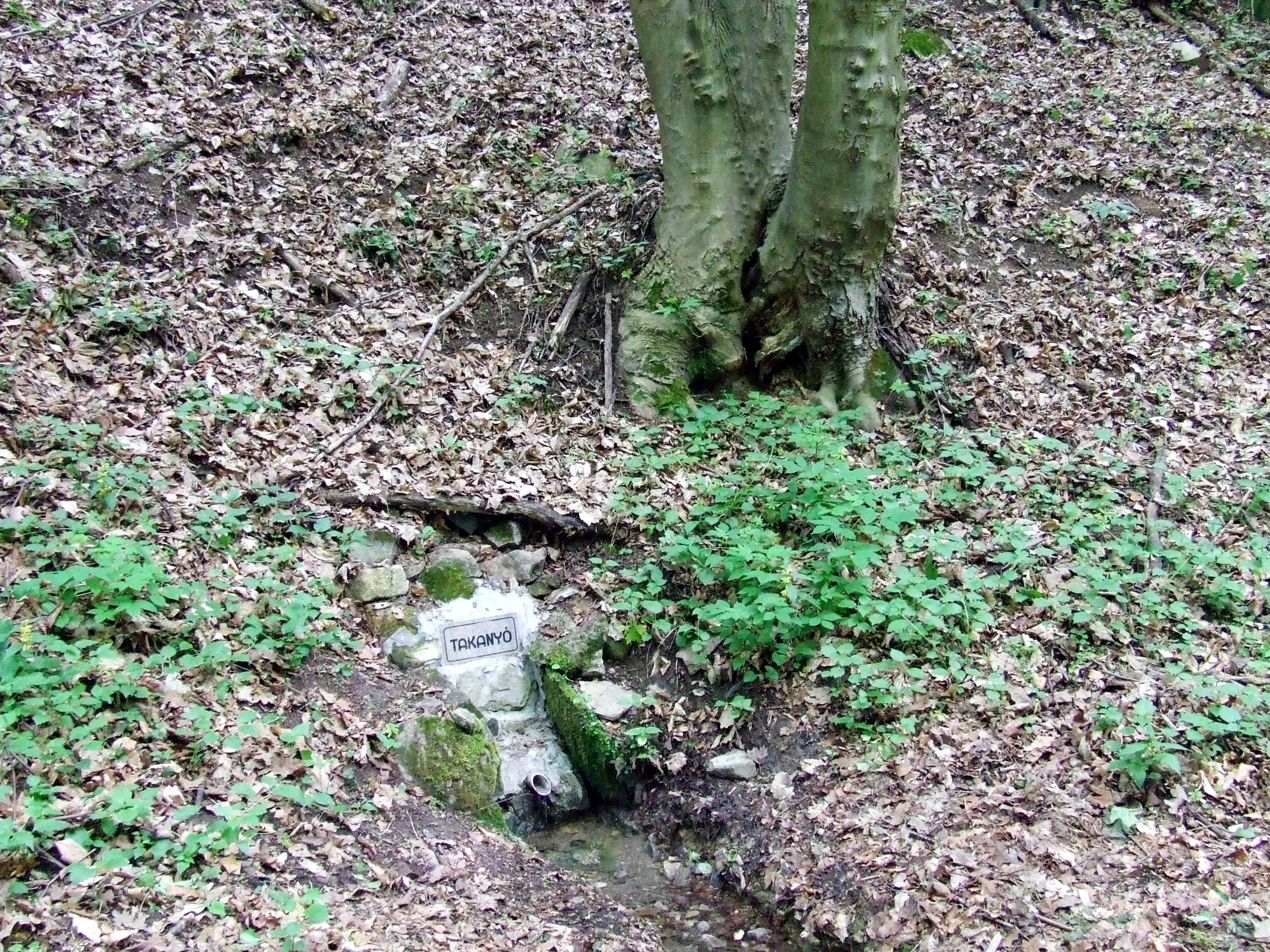
Spring Takanyó at Takanyó Valley

- Spring Csengő
- Spring Takanyó

== Fauna ==
There are some highly protected bird species which hatch their nests here.
