= Pécsvárad =

Pécsvárad Petschwar
- Town
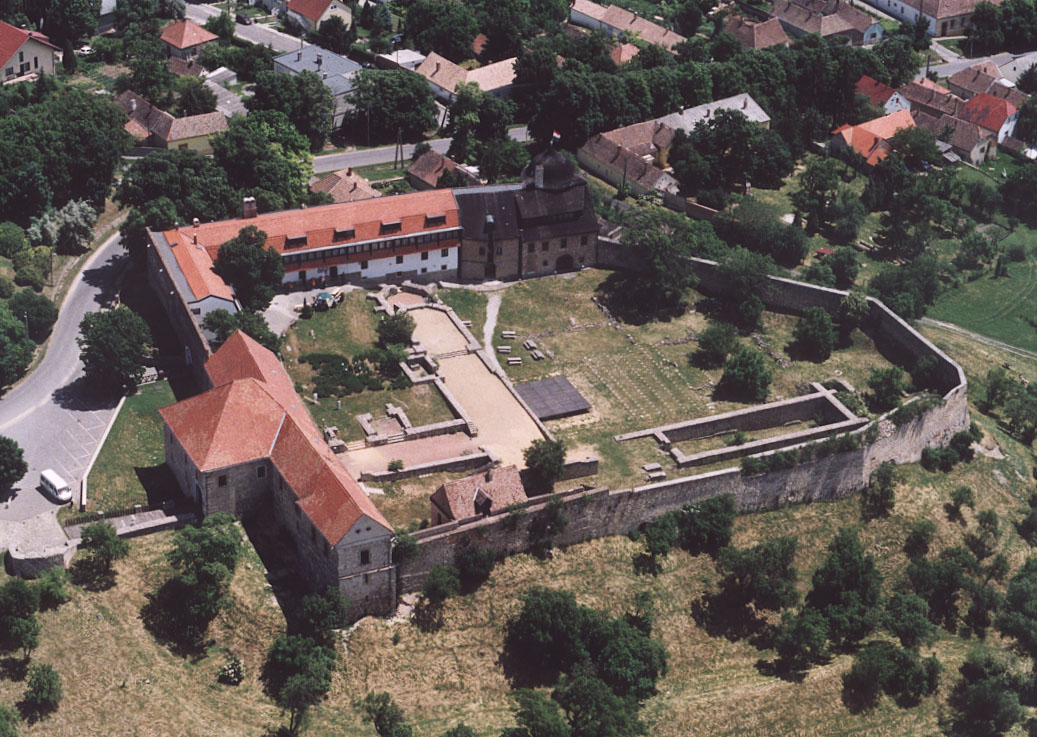
- Pécsvárad, Monastery

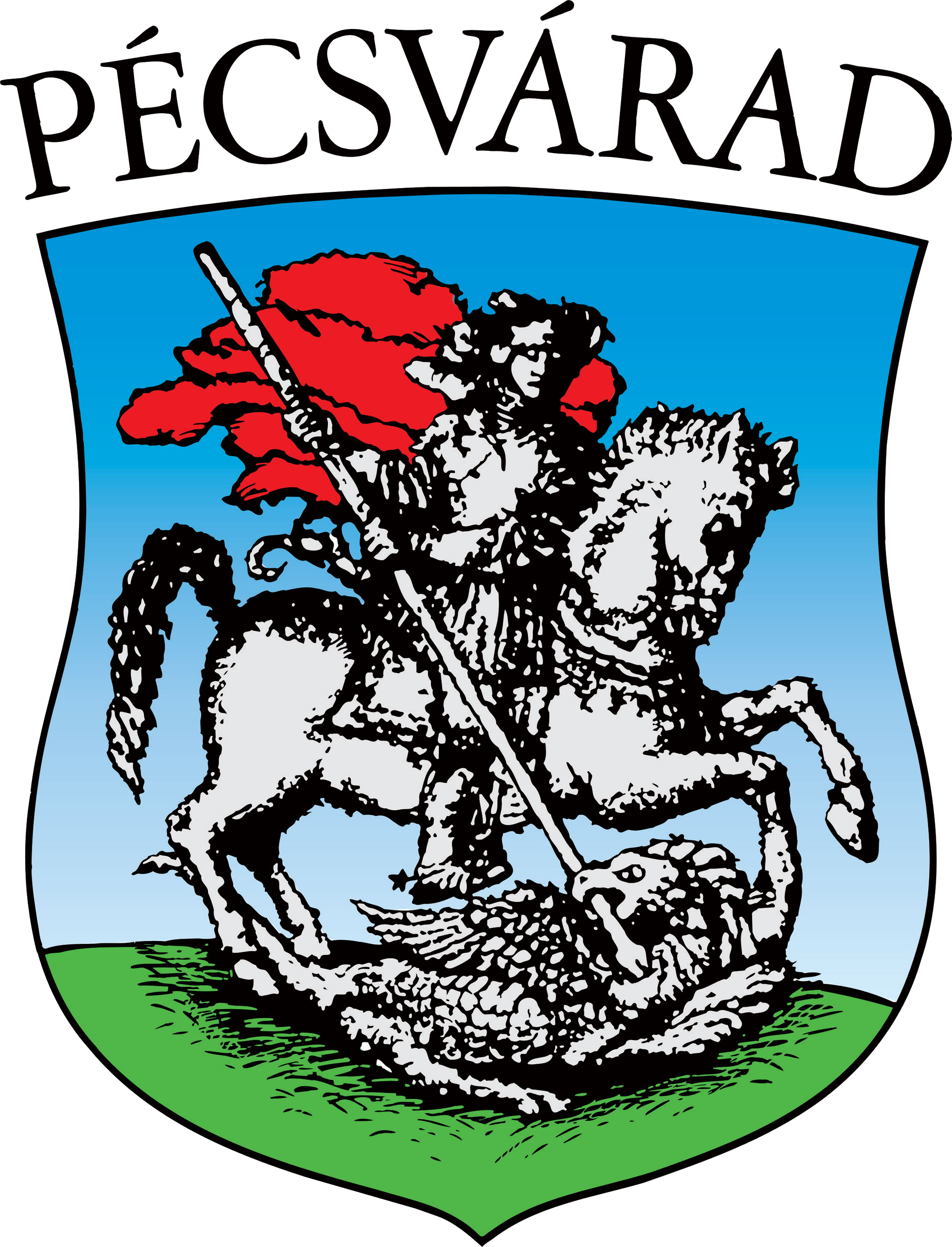
- Coat of arms

- Location of Pécsvárad in Baranya County Location of Pécsvárad in Hungary
- Coordinates: 46.15810°N 18.42216°E
- Country: Hungary
- County: Baranya
- District: Pécsvárad

Area
  - Total: 112.16 km^{2} (43.31 sq mi)

Population (2015)
  - Total: 4,026
  - Density: 35.90/km^{2} (92.97/sq mi)
- Time zone: UTC+1 (CET)
  - Summer (DST): UTC+2 (CEST)
- Postal code: 7720
- Area code: (+36) 72
- Website: www.pecsvarad.hu

Pécsvárad (Hungarian pronunciation: [ˈpeːt͡ʃvaːrɒd]; German: Petschwar; Croatian: Pečvar) is a town in Baranya County, southern Hungary.

== Geography ==
Pécsvárad is on the southern slope of the Mecsek mountains, in particular the part called Kelet-Mecsek. It's at the foot of the Zengő, the highest peak of these mountains at 682 metres. The Danube is about 25 kilometers to the east-southeast. Pécs is 19 kilometers to the south-southwest.

Lake Dombay is in the western outskirts of the town. about two kilomters from the center. It is a man made lake and recreational area.

== History ==
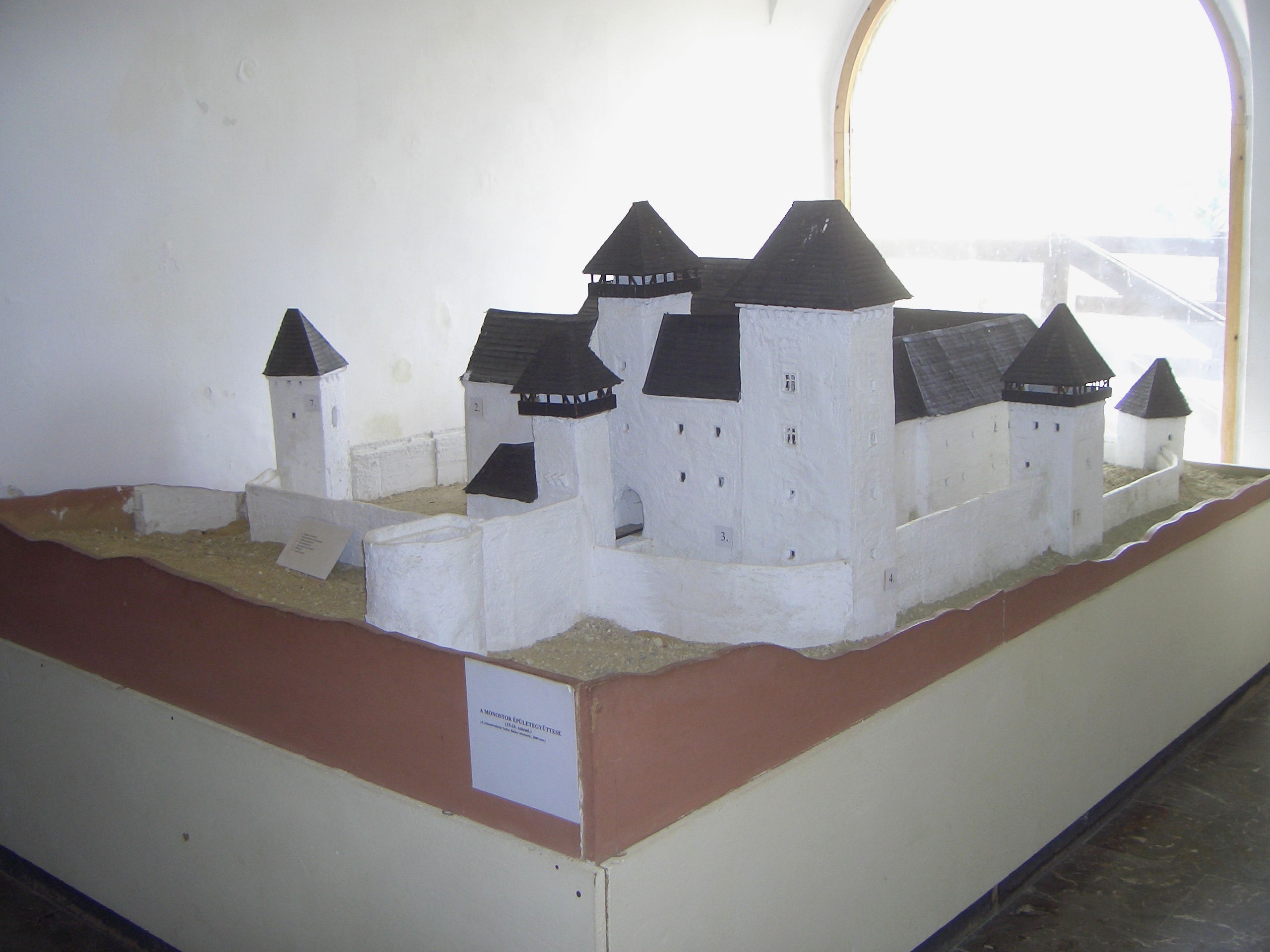
The castle / monastery

The medieval history of Pécsvárad is closely connected to the medieval Pécsvárad Abbey, an abbey and castle that dominated the town. It was founded by Stephen I of Hungary in 1015. From here, bishop Astrik was later said to have left for Rome to collect the Crown of Hungary. Later kings expanded its possessions. After the 1526 Battle of Mohács and the subsequent Ottoman invasion, the abbey was destroyed.

=== The Ottoman occupation ===
During the Turkish occupation, Pécsvárad was one of the five court seats in Baranya. The town itself began to decline. In the Baranya the Hungarian inhabitants in the southwest, south and southeast of the province converted to Calvinism. The inhabitants of Pécsvárad also converted to Calvinism. However, the parishes of Pécs, Pécsvárad and Zengővárkony were islands in a mainly Catholic area.

The Turkish defeat in the 1683 Battle of Vienna spelled the end of the Ottoman rule of Hungary. After the 1686 reconquest of Budapest, a Christian army moved south. In October 1686, it conquered Pécs. The final Habsburg conquest of Baranya was made possible by the August 1687 Battle of Mohács, which led to conquest of Osijek, and finally in February 1689, Szigetvár.

=== Habsburg rule ===
After the reconquest of the Baranya, the Habsburg emperor took ownership of all the land for the state. Only the claims of those who possessed land and could also prove to have possessed their lands before 1526 were recognized. This was of course impossible for most. Indeed, most had acquired their lands during Turkish rule, or claimed them just after the reconquest. Pécsvárad Abbey was one of the few landlords that could prove claims from before the Ottoman occupation.

As the Habsburg state wanted to secure a reliable income from the conquered territories, it sold leases to most of the land. In 1688, Francesco Giani (Hung. Jany) Provost of Csorna leased a whole lot of villages from the crown. Giani then built up a domain centered on Pécsvárad Abbey, of which he became the abbot. However, this was only a domain, the castle and its church were not rebuilt.

Giani made consistent attempts to convert the area to Catholicism. With help of the Jesuits and the army he succeeded in converting many Calvinists, among them the pastor of Pécsvárad. This success was mainly due to the fact that Giani combined religious and worldy authority. In 1702, Giani died and his lands reverted to the crown.

=== Rákóczi's War of Independence ===
Giani had settled a lot of Germans on his lands. In 1702 Pécsvárad village had 57 families, 27 of these were German, or 47%. One reason to do this, was to make the area Catholic. The other reason was that the German artisan colonists would generate more income for Giani. However, the lasting effects of Giani's attempts were negligible.

In 1703 Rákóczi's War of Independence started. In 1704, many farmers of the villages which had been ruled by Giani joined the troops of Rákóczi. Something that did not happen in the other Calvinist areas of the Baranya. After the end of the war in 1711, all that could be found of Giani's colonization attempt in 1713 were two German families in Pécsvárad, and one in Mecseknádasd.

=== Second wave of colonists ===
In 1711, Count Philipp Ludwig von Zinzendorf became abbot of Pécsvárad. During his (1711-1735) tenure, he brought in a new wave of German colonists to settle the area that belonged to the abbey. These colonists would stay and give Pécsvárad its German character.

=== Gifted to Budapest University ===
Queen Maria Theresa donated the Lordship Pécsvárad to the University of Trnava (Tyrnau). This university moved to Budapest in 1777, where it became the Eötvös Loránd University.

The gift of the lordship of Pécsvárad to the university made that the treasury (Königliche Kammer) became responsible for maintaining the lordship. In 1785/6 it sent 8 families (36 persons) from the Rhine area to settle in Pécsvárad.

=== Descriptions of the village ===
In 1780 Pécsvárad was mentioned as Pécsvár. Or really as three market villages: Magyar-Pécsvár with only Hungarian inhabitants and an abbey from 1007; Német-Pécsvár with only German inhabitants and a Catholic church; and Rátz-Pécsvár with Croat inhabitants and a Greek Orthodox church.

In the 1830s, Pécsvárad had 356 houses and 2,694 inhabitants. There were two Catholic churches, one Orthodox church, and one Protestant church. The inhabitants existed from agriculture, viticulture, a sweet chestnut forest, freshwater mussels, forest game, and a yearly market. In the 1840s, the castle, a paper mill and a coal mine were noted. The paper mill might have been in Hird, a neighbouring village that was part of the Lordship Pécsvárad.

An address book of the late 1800s gives an idea of activities in Pécsvárad. People were employed in about 60 different crafts and occupations. There were e.g. five lawyers in town. Other examples were four blacksmiths, six joineries, and about fifteen mills. These mills were probably of the then popular type that consisted of an industrial mechanism driven by animals.

During the 1800s Pécsvárad remained a mixed German / Hungarian village. In 1880, there were 2,848 inhabitants, 42.5% of these were Hungarian and 55.4% German. In 1890, there were 3,016 inhabitants. The population then began to decline a bit: in 1900, there were only 2,741 inhabitants; In 1910 2,773; and in 1920 2,640 with 50.5% Hungarians and 48.9% Germans.

== Notable landmarks ==
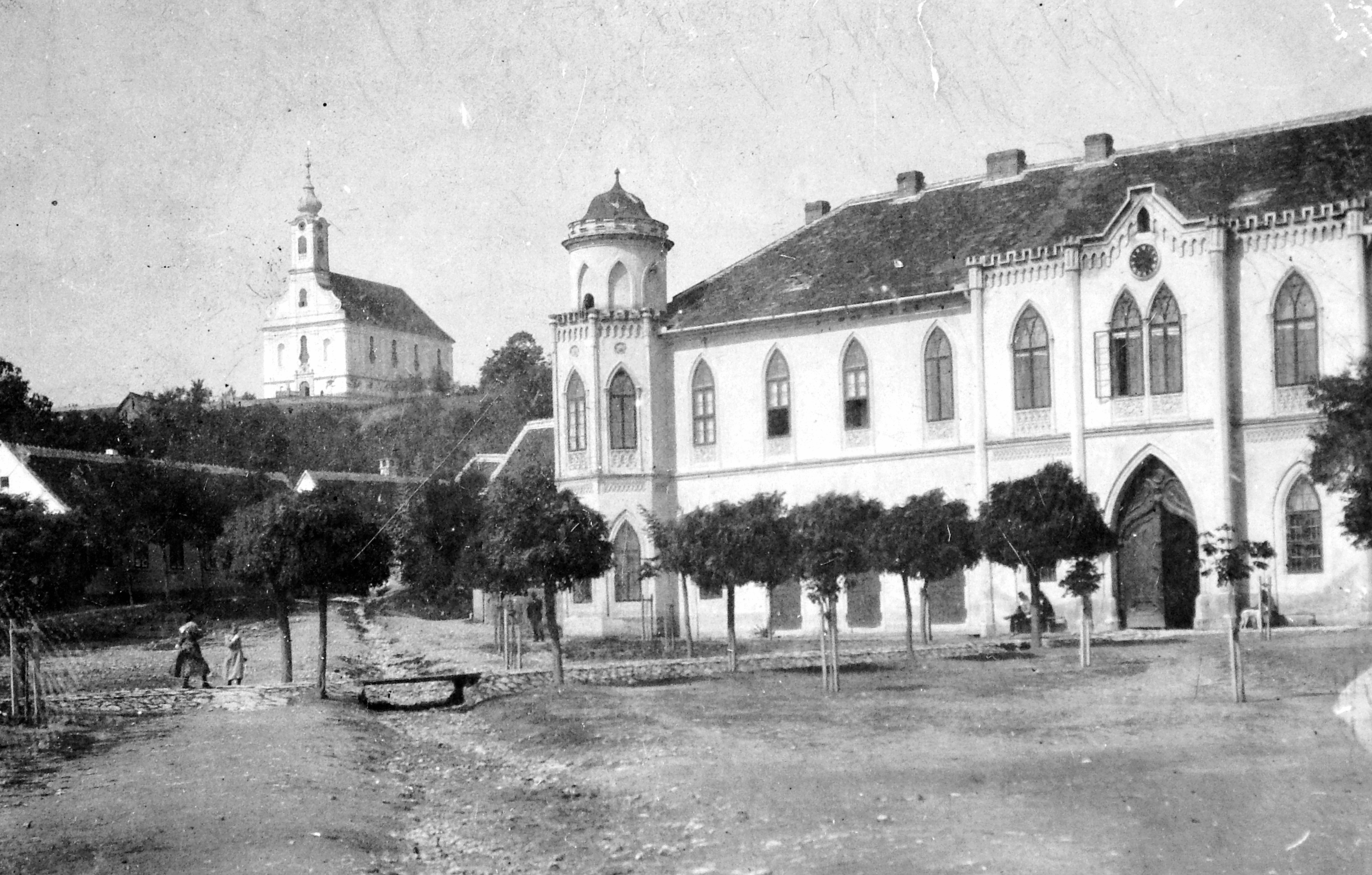
Town hall

=== Benedictine Abbey ===
The former Benedictine Pécsvárad Abbey is of national significance. The medieval walls and some towers of the abbey are still standing. The complex was significantly restored in the early 21st century, making the foundations of the medieval structures visible. It is now used as a museum and a hotel.

=== Town Hall ===
The town hall of Pécsvárad is a listed building. It was designed by the architect Ágoston Gianone, who was reputedly of Italian descent. It was built from 1855 to 1857 in a Neo Gothic style. Among the many town halls built at the time, it was kind of exceptional by having two small towers.

=== Cavalry Barracks ===
By the early 19th century, there were large barracks in Pécsvárad. These were meant for a cavalry regiment, which was permanently stationed in the area. The building is listed. It is of Baroque origin, changed in the 19th century. It is now a school.

=== Other sights ===
Opposite the barracks, there was a large military hospital. Nearby is a cemetery and monument to some Soviet soldiers who died in the area. At the nearby defunct railroad station is a rail car that is a monument to the mass expulsion of German and Hungarian citizens from and to the area during the Soviet occupation.

== Transport ==
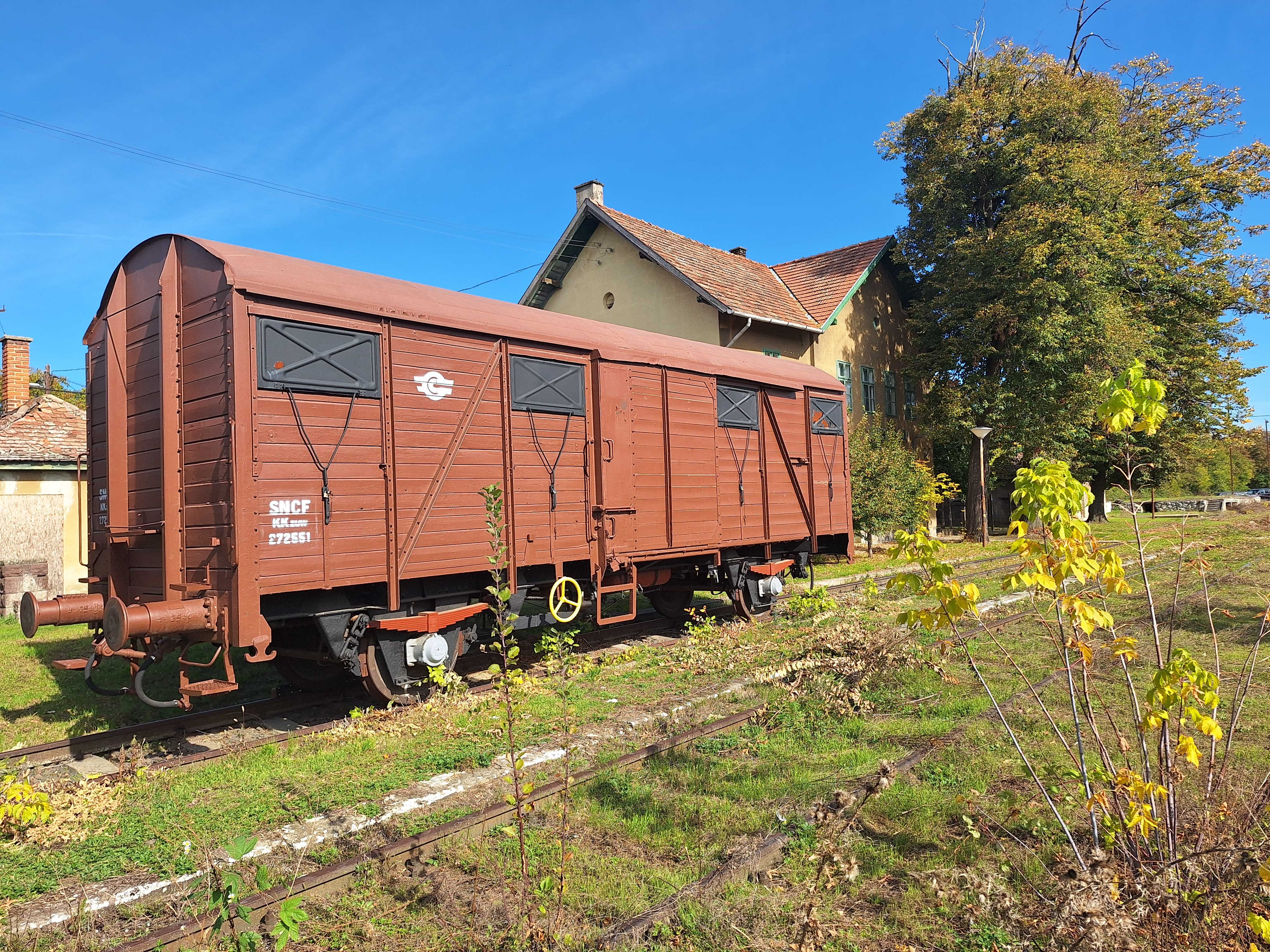
Monument to Soviet deportations in the late 1940s

Pécsvárad is 19 kilometers from Pécs, the center of the Eastern Mecsek. In 1817 a road was constructed from Pecs via Pécsvárad to Budapest. Pécsvárad is now next to the new main road 6.

Pécsvárad is on the now discontinued Pécs-Bátaszék railway line. This line was opened on 30 June 1911. Between Pécs and Bátaszék, it had 14 stops / stations. The line included a 3.8 km long stretch between Mecsekszabolcs and Uszög. In Bátaszék it connected to the Hungarian State Railways. In and near Pécs it connected to other lines. For passengers, the line was a very local affair. In its later years, it operated the Motor coach / car ČSD Class M 152.0.

From 1997, passenger traffic on the Pécs-Bátaszék line was gradually phased out. Freight traffic followed shortly after. The line was finally discontinued in 2009. The line was very slow, which was also due to its curvy track. Therefore, for locals, the less comfortable busses were a better option.

== Twin towns – sister cities ==
Pécsvárad is twinned with:

- Hausmannstätten, Austria
- Jur nad Hronom, Slovakia
- Külsheim, Germany
- Pannonhalma, Hungary
- Satu Mare, Romania
- Unterschleißheim, Germany
- Velyki Berehy, Ukraine

== Notable people ==
- Endre Nemes (1909–1985), artist

== Gallery ==
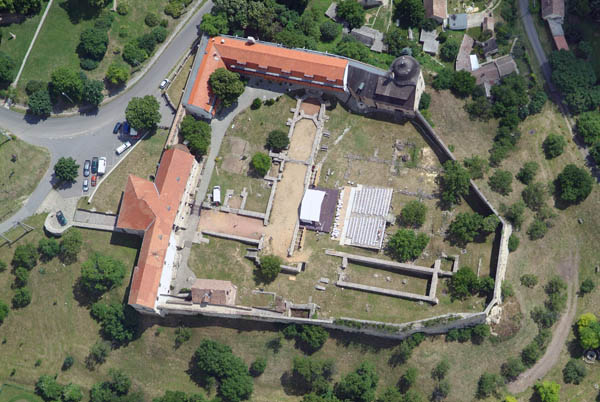

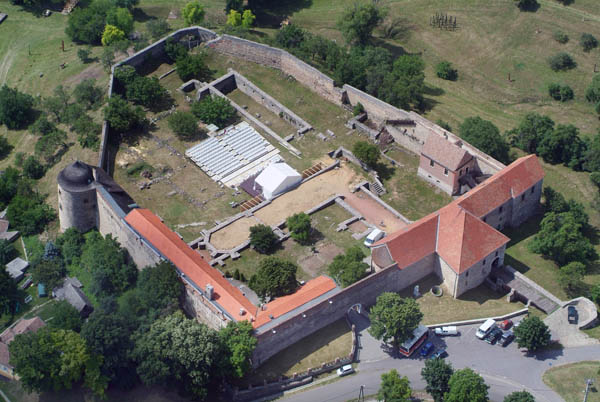

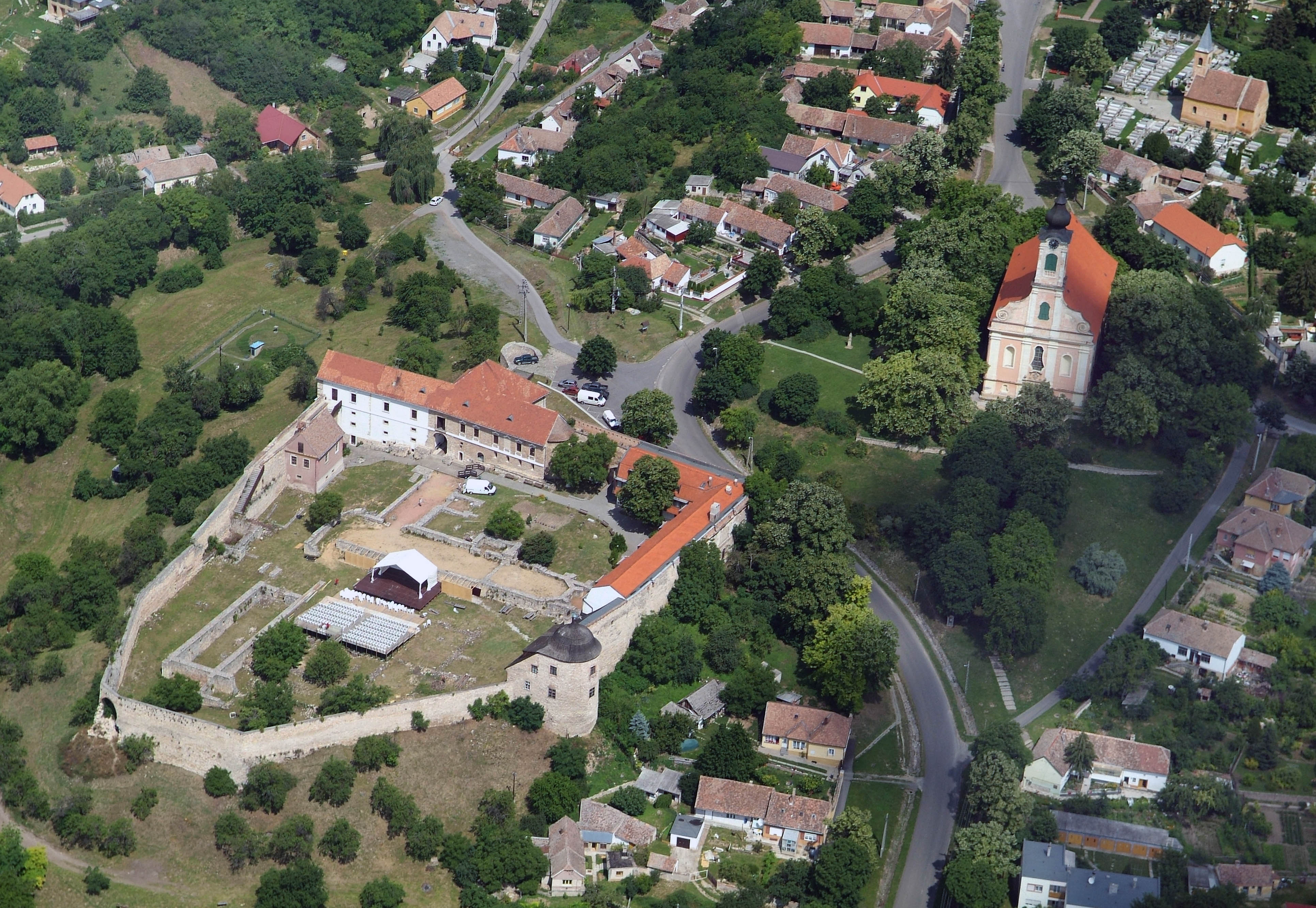
