= Zengő =

Mountain in Hungary

Coordinates: 46°11′N 18°23′E

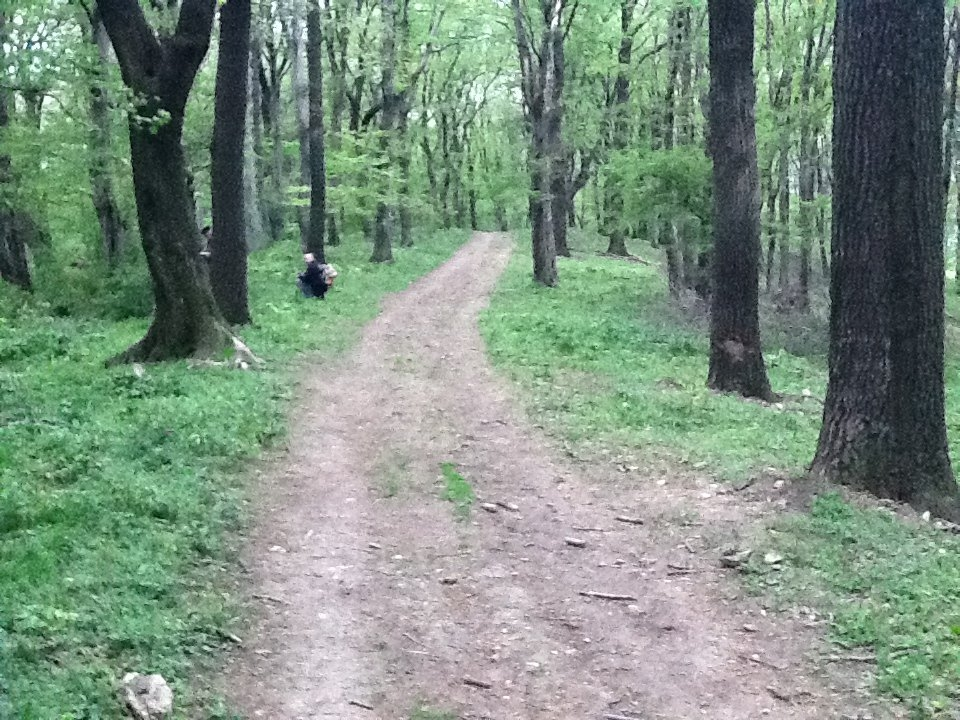
Down the mountain.

Zengő (Hungarian: [ˈzɛŋɡøː]; Croatian: Zenka) is the highest mountain in Mecsek Mountains in southern Hungary – its height is 682 metres. The peak is situated in the southeastern part of the range. On its top, along with a look-out tower, stand the ruins of a small medieval castle, which was probably built on the site of an earlier guard tower of the Roman Empire.

The peak can be most easily reached from Pécsvárad or Hosszúhetény.

== Name ==
Its name literally translates as "resonant". According to the local legend the noise heard from the mountain from time to time is caused by treasure hunters who entered the mountainside hundreds of years ago and could never come out again.

== Radar plan ==
In 2005 the Hungarian government abandoned a plan to build a NATO radar on the peak after fierce resistance to the plan from locals and green groups who argued that the radar and the adjacent road construction would damage strictly protected species living on the mountains including the Paeonia officinalis ssp. banatica. Ninety percent of the total population of that rare flower lives on the Zengő.

Forcing the government to give up the plan was the most successful action of environmentalists in Hungary for over a decade. The defenders of the Zengő included former Constitutional Court head László Sólyom who in 2005 was elected President of the Republic by parliament despite the ruling Hungarian Socialist Party's will. Sólyom often took tours on the mountain.

== See also ==
- Mecsek
- Transdanubia
- Geography of Hungary
