= Kékesd =

- Village
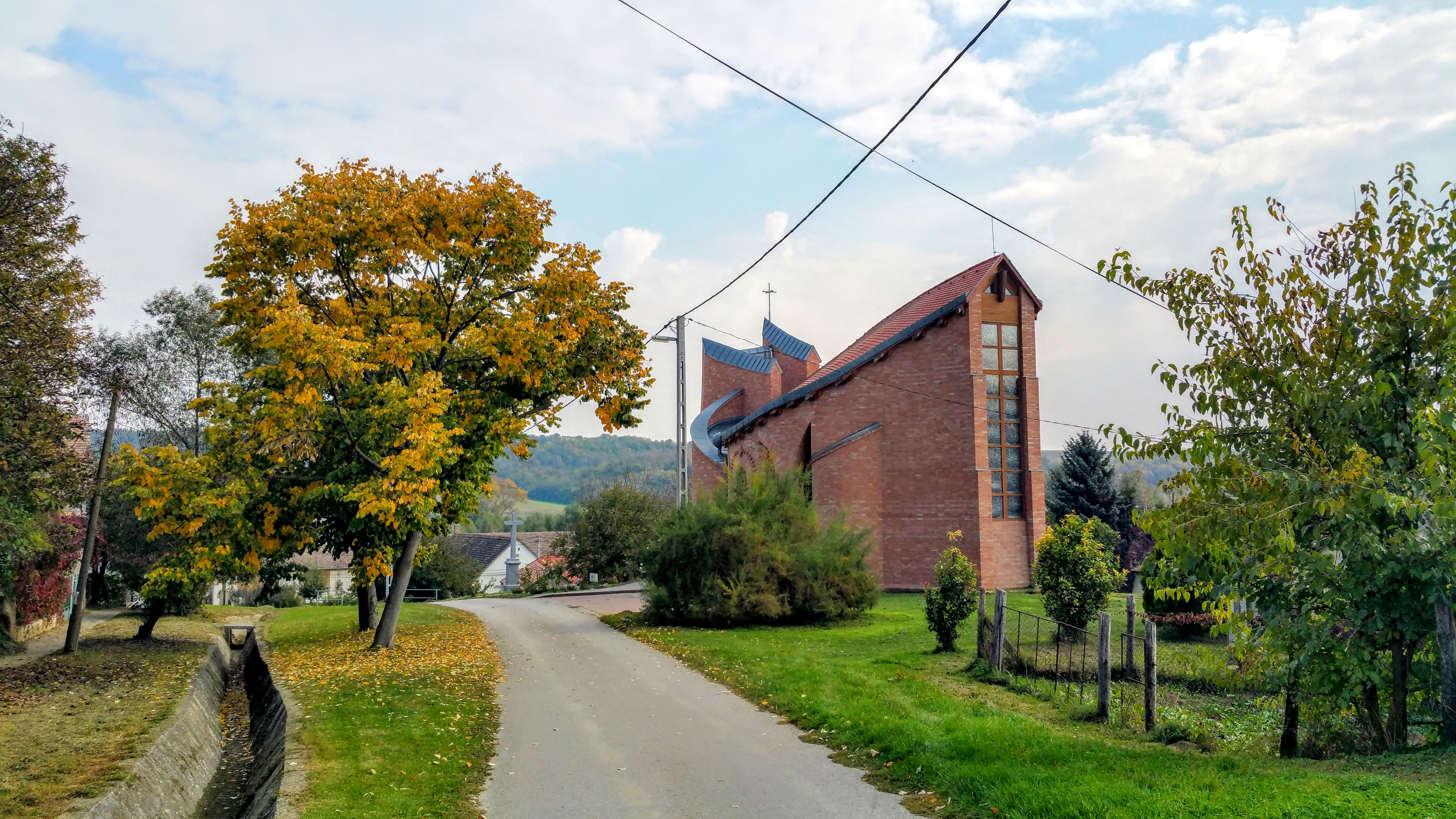

- Location within Baranya County Location within Hungary
- Coordinates: 46°06′N 18°28′E
- Country: Hungary
- County: Baranya
- Time zone: UTC+1 (CET)
  - Summer (DST): UTC+2 (CEST)

Kékesd is a village in Baranya county, Hungary.
