= Kátoly =

- Village
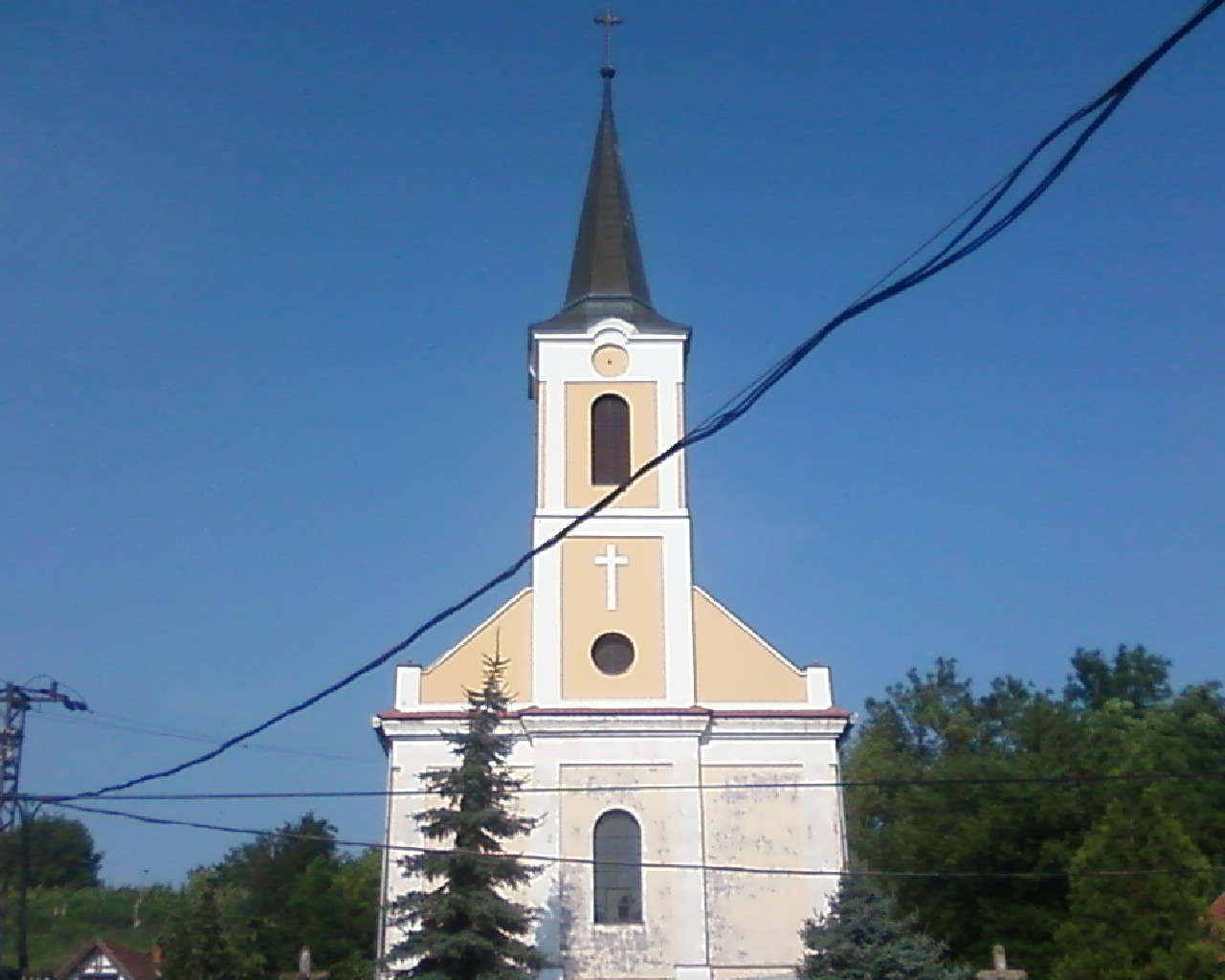
- Kátoly
- Interactive map of Kátoly
- Coordinates: 46°04′N 18°27′E
- Country: Hungary
- County: Baranya
- Time zone: UTC+1 (CET)
  - Summer (DST): UTC+2 (CEST)

Kátoly is a village in Baranya county, Hungary.
