= Erzsébet =

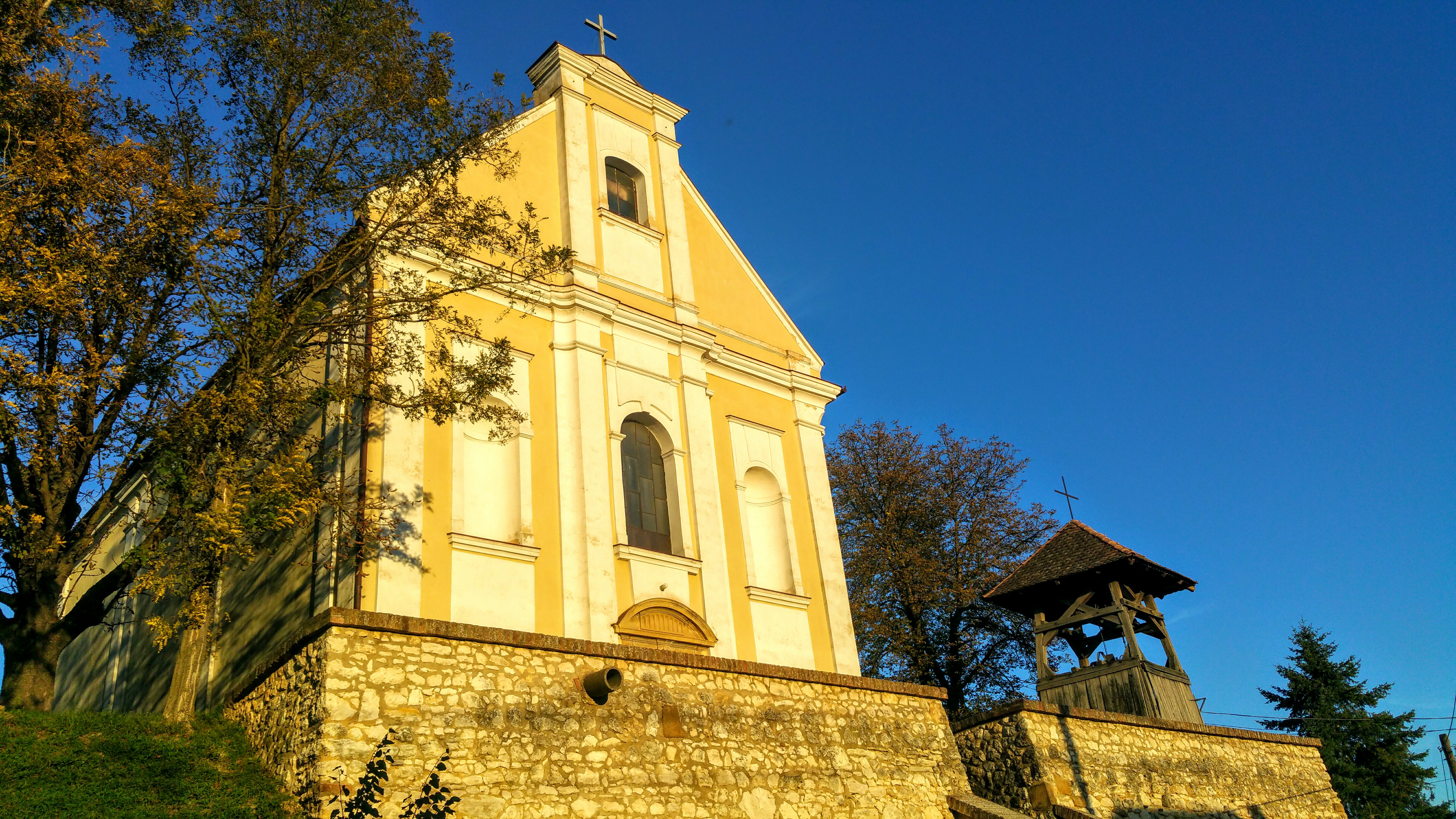

- Location of Baranya county in Hungary

- Location of Erzsébet
- Coordinates: 46.10025°N 18.45896°E
- Country: Hungary
- County: Baranya

Area
  - Total: 9.75 km^{2} (3.76 sq mi)

Population (2015)
  - Total: 264
  - Density: 27.1/km^{2} (70.1/sq mi)
- Time zone: UTC+1 (CET)
  - Summer (DST): UTC+2 (CEST)
- Postal code: 7661
- Area code: 69

For the woman's first name, see Elizabeth (given name)

Erzsébet (Croatian: Setržebet, German: Sandeschewe) is a village in Baranya county, Hungary.

== Demographics ==
The ethnic composition of the village of Erzsébet
1. Hungarian (81.4%)
2. German (10.5%)
3. Romani (8.14%)
The religious composition of the village of Erzsébet
1. Roman Catholics (63.6%)
2. No religion (12.6%)
3. Reformed (2.45%)
4. Unknown (21.3%)

According to a 2011 census, the village of Erzsébet had 286 inhabitants. From an ethnic point of view, the majority of the inhabitants (81.36%) were Hungarians, with minorities of Germans (10.51%) and Roma (8.14%).[3]

From a religious point of view, the majority of the inhabitants (81.36%) were Hungarians, with minorities of Germans (10.51%) and Roma (8.14%).[3]

From a religious point of view, the majority of the inhabitants (63.64%) were Roman Catholic, with minorities of people without religion (12.59%) and reformed (2.45%). For 21.33% of the inhabitants, the religious affiliation is not known.
