= Asterion (disambiguation) =

Asterion can refer to:

- Asterion, name of multiple figures in Greek mythology
- Asterion, a star, also known as Chara or as Beta Canum Venaticorum in the constellation of Canes Venatici
- "The House of Asterion", a short tale by Jorge Luis Borges
- Asterion (anatomy), a point on the human skull
- Asterion, a Thessalian Argonaut in Argonautica
- Lamborghini Asterion, a concept sports car
- Asterion (city), an ancient city of Thessaly, Greece
- Asterion (sculptor), a sculptor of ancient Greece

Asterios can refer to:

- Asterios Polyp, a graphic novel by David Mazzucchelli
- Asterios Karagiannis, a Greek footballer
- Asterios, an Achaean Argonaut in Argonautica
- Asterios Giakoumis, a Greek footballer
- Asterios Peltekis, a Greek actor and director
- Asterios Ikonomikos, a Greek footballer

Asterio can refer to:

- Asterio Mañanós Martínez, a Spanish painter
- Asterio Appi, a Nauruan politician
