= Damianos Zarifis =

Damianos Zarifis (Greek: Δαμιανός Ζαρίφης; 1946 in Kavala – 29 May 2007 in Athens) was a Greek scenic and costume designer.

== Biography ==
Born in 1946 in Kavala, Eastern Macedonia, Damianos Zarifis studied at first at the Vakalo School and later at the Beaux-Arts de Paris, during the period of the Greek Junta. During his time in Paris, he met Eleni Varopoulou, a fellow student and later a theatrologist, whom he subsequently married and had a daughter with.

After his return to Greece in 1974 Zarifis initially worked with Karolos Koun Greek Art Theatre, where he designed for more than twenty productions. The following years he designed sets and costumes for major public theatrical institutions and organisations in Greece and Cyprus, including the National Theatre of Greece, the National Theatre of Northern Greece and the Theatrical Organization of Cyprus, but also for a number of private theatres. At the same time, Zarifis also collaborated with the National Opera of Greece and the Athens Concert Hall as a scenographer and costume designer, in a total of 11 operas. He also worked on film productions, including Efapax (2001), Brides (2004) and El Greco (2007). He is considered as one the most important Greek scenic and costume designers.

He died on 29 May 2007, after a four-year illness (cancer), at the age of 61. His funeral took place at the First Cemetery of Athens.
