= Hungarian Theatre of Cluj =

Theatre in Cluj-Napoca, Romania

Coordinates: 46.772332°N 23.583892°E

- Kolozsvári Állami Magyar Színház; Teatrul Maghiar de Stat Cluj
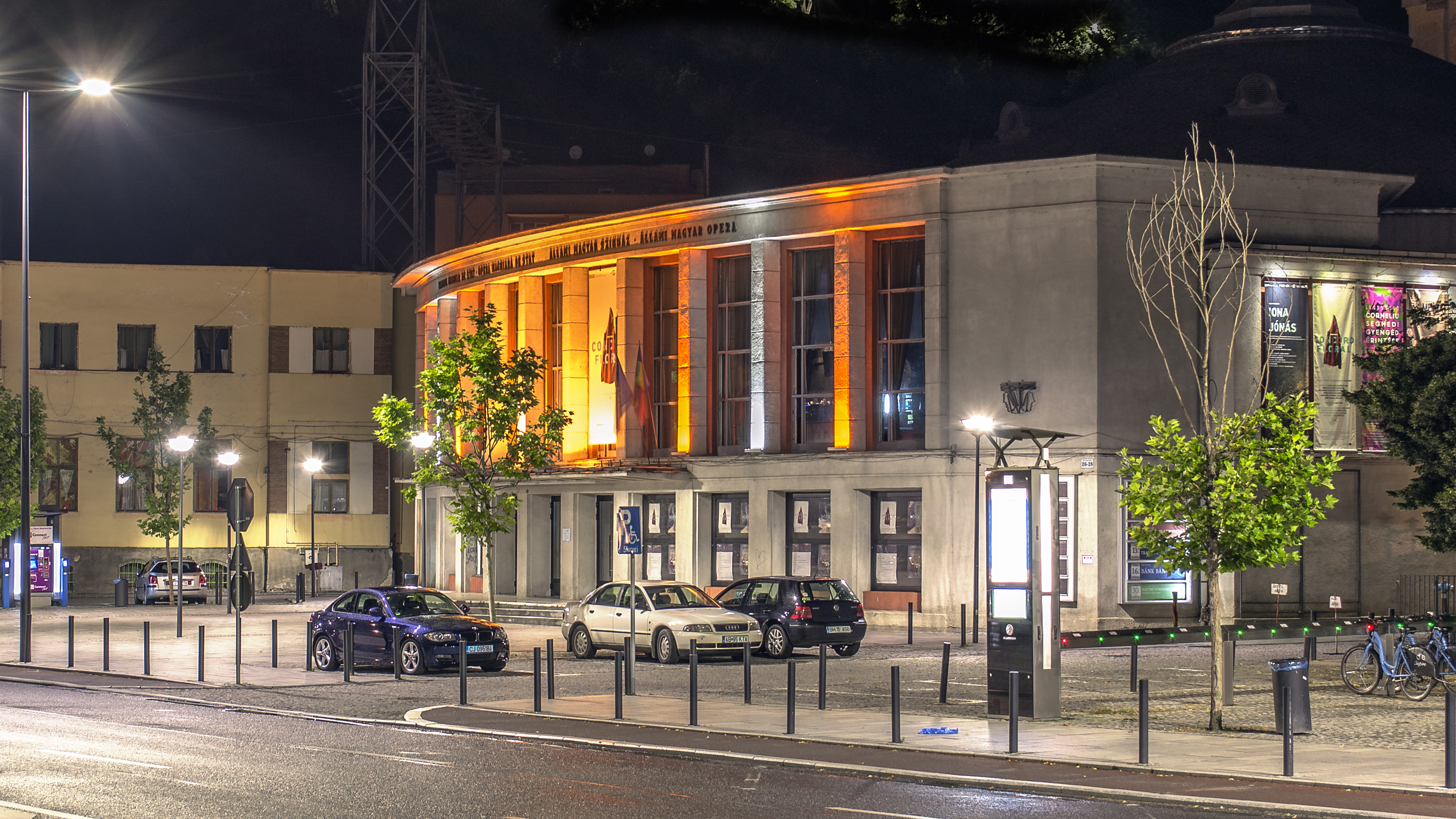
- Front view
- Interactive map of the Hungarian Theatre of Cluj area

General information
- Architectural style: Secession; Socialist realism
- Location: Cluj-Napoca, Romania
- Completed: 1910

Design and construction
- Architects: Géza Márkus, Frigyes Spiegel (1909-1910); Ioan Paiu, János Sóvágó (1959-1961 reconstruction); Teodor Raiciu (2008 - Studio Hall)

Other information
- Seating capacity: Main Hall: 862 seats Studio Hall: 99 seats

The State Hungarian Theatre of Cluj (Hungarian: Kolozsvári Állami Magyar Színház; Romanian: Teatrul Maghiar de Stat din Cluj) is a theatre in Cluj-Napoca, Romania. Performances are played in Hungarian, with simultaneous translation into Romanian or English usually available.

The structure, built during 1909-1910 and reconstructed in 1959-1961, can seat 862 people in the main auditorium. The building, which also houses the Cluj-Napoca Hungarian Opera, is listed in the National Register of Historic Monuments.

== History ==
The Hungarian Theatre of Cluj was founded in 1792 and was the first Hungarian theatre company in Transylvania, now a part of modern-day Romania. The Hungarian Theatre of Cluj functions as a repertory theatre, entirely subsidized by the Romanian Ministry of Culture.

The defining periods of the theatre were shaped by directors of international fame who are considered key figures of Hungarian and European theatre, including Gyula E. Kovács, the initiator of the Shakespeare-series, Jenő Janovics, founder of the first Hungarian film studio, and György Harag, a great Maestro of the theatre in Romania.

In 1990 Gábor Tompa was appointed artistic director of the Hungarian Theatre of Cluj. Under his leadership, the theatre has continued Harag's tradition of innovation, based on a repertoire that includes classic masterpieces as well as contemporary plays. During the last 18 years the Hungarian Theatre of Cluj has aligof contemporary theatre and taken its place in the circuit of European theatres. This has been largely due to international co-productions and collaborations with world-renowned professionals: directors such as Vlad Mugur, Silviu Purcărete, Andrei Șerban, Mihai Măniuţiu, Victor Ioan Frunză, Mathias Langhoff, David Zinder, Dragoş Galgoţiu, Patrick Le Mauff, Elie Malka, Dominique Serrand, Michal Docekal and Robert Woodruff; set and costume designers such as Andrei Both, Csaba Antal, Doina Levintza, Lia Manţoc, Martin Chocholousek, Dragos Buhagiar, and Helmut Stürmer; and composers such as Vasile Șirli and Iosif Herțea.

Productions of the Hungarian Theatre of Cluj have received significant national and international recognition. In 1993, Eugène Ionesco's The Bald Prima Donna, directed by Gábor Tompa, won the Best Foreign Performance of the Year Award when it toured England; it also went to Finland, France, the Republic of Moldova and Hungary. In 2007, Tompa's production of András Visky's Long Friday was presented at the 16th Festival of the Union of the Theatres of Europe in Turin. And in 2008, UNITER, the Union of Romanian Theatres, gave three awards to the Hungarian Theatre's production of Anton Chekhov's Uncle Vanya, directed by Andrei Şerban. András Hatházi received the Award for Best Actor for his performance in the title role, and Andrei Şerban the Award for Best Director of the Year, while the production as a whole won the award for Best Performance of the Year. This was the fifth time the Hungarian Theatre of Cluj had won the UNITER Award for Best Performance of the Year. Previously, Bus Stop in 1990, The Venetian Twins in 1998, The Cherry Orchard in 1999, and Woyzeck in 2005, were all distinguished by this honor. Then in 2009 "Three Sisters" became the sixth performance to win the Best Performance Award and Gábor Tompa became for the fourth time the Best Director of the Year. "Victor or power to the Children" and Silviu Purcarete repeated the "double" in 2014.

In 2007, on the 215th anniversary of its existence, the Hungarian Theatre of Cluj successfully hosted the 1st INTERFERENCES International Theatre Festival, with 12 productions from 7 countries.

The following April, the theatre was accepted as a full member of the Union of the Theatres of Europe and in the fall of 2008 the Hungarian Theatre of Cluj, together with the Bulandra Theatre of Bucharest, organized the 17th Festival of the Union of the Theatres of Europe.

Gallery
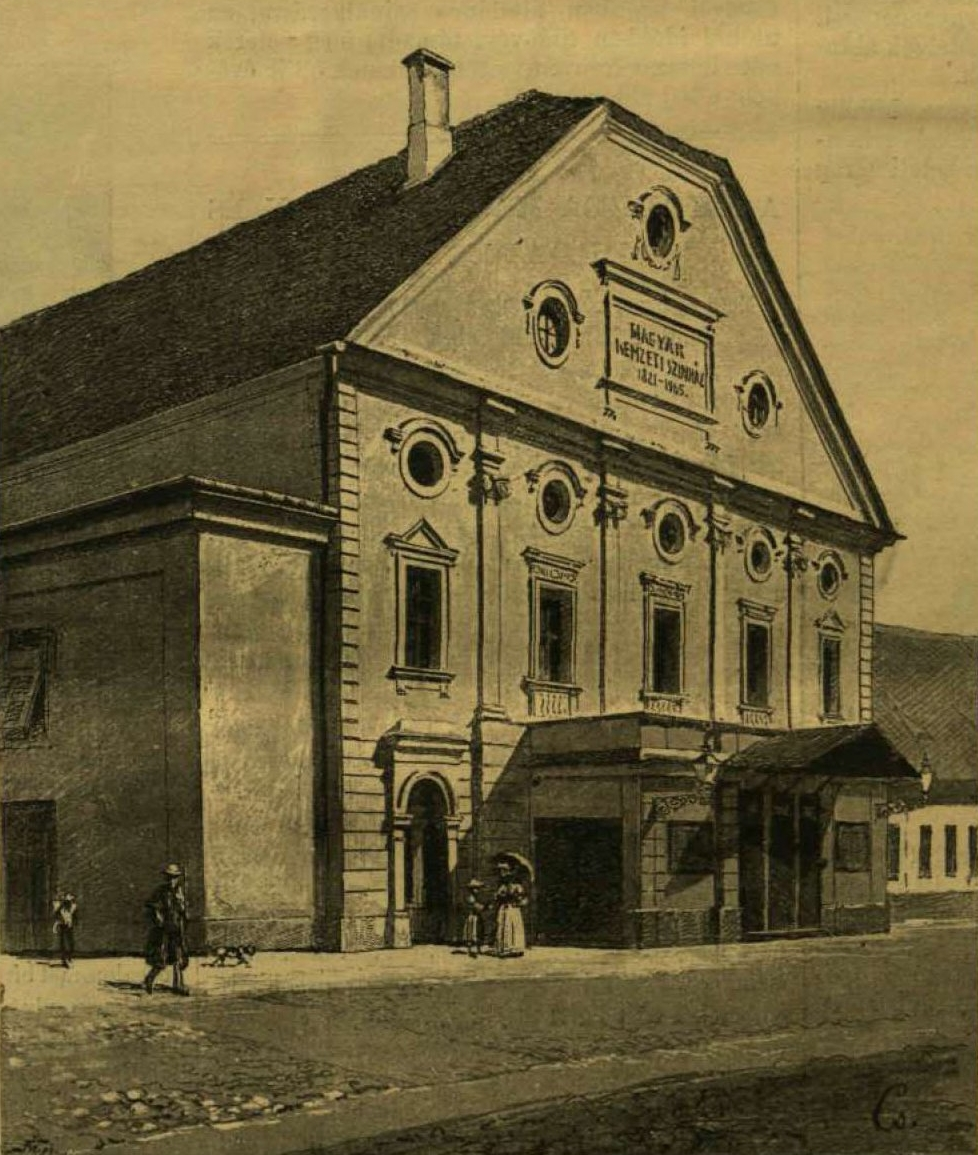
The first Hungarian Theatre building

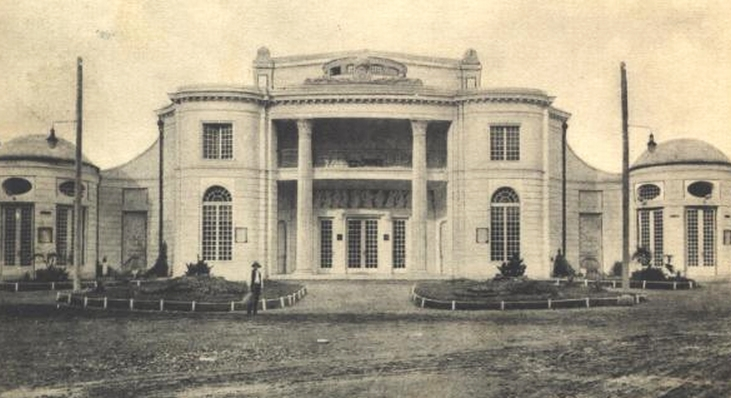
The building during the first part of the 20th century

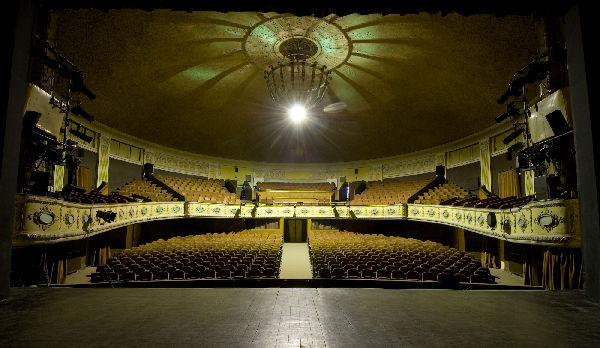
The theatre's Main Hall
