= Museum for the Macedonian Struggle (Thessaloniki) =

- Μουσείο Μακεδονικού Αγώνα
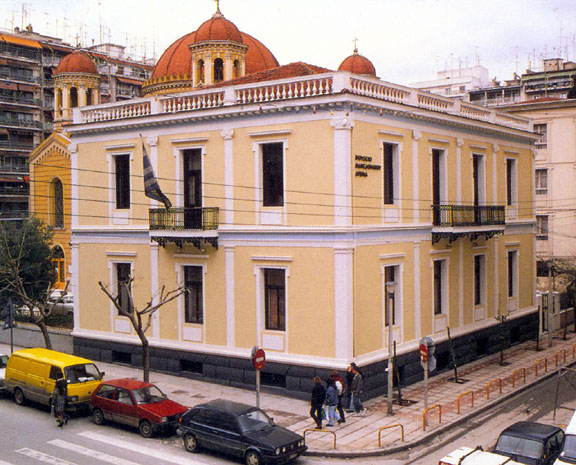
- The exterior of the museum
- Interactive map of the Museum for the Macedonian Struggle area
- Former names: Greek Consulate of Thessaloniki

General information
- Status: Museum
- Type: Conuslate; Bank; School; Museum
- Architectural style: Neo-classical
- Location: Thessaloniki, Greece
- Coordinates: 40°37′51″N 22°56′37″E
- Named for: Macedonian Struggle
- Construction started: September 1892
- Completed: August 1893
- Opened: 1980
- Owner: City of Thessaloniki

Technical details
- Floor count: 2

Design and construction
- Architect: Ernst Ziller
- Known for: Headquarters of the Hellenic Macedonian Committee

Other information
- Public transit access: Agias Sofias

The Museum for the Macedonian Struggle is located in the centre of the city Thessaloniki in Central Macedonia, Greece. It occupies a neo-classical building designed by the renowned architect Ernst Ziller and built in 1893. In its six ground-floor rooms the museum graphically illustrates the modern and contemporary history of Greek Macedonia. It presents the social, economic, political and military developments that shaped the presence of Hellenism in the region. This approach enables the visitor to form a global picture, not only of the revolutionary movements in the area, but also of the rapidly changing society of the southern Balkans and its agonizing struggles to balance between tradition and modernization.

== The building ==
On 23 August 1890, a huge fire destroyed the southeastern quarters of Thessaloniki. Among the losses was the humble residence that housed the Consulate General of Greece It was next to a little-known church of St. Demetrius, also destroyed by the fire. Both buildings and the site were the property of the Greek Orthodox Community.

Soon, with the insurance money, the donation by Andreas Syngros and the help offered by the Greek government, a sufficient amount was collected to reconstruct the buildings of the Greek community. Among them was a new church dedicated to Saint Gregory Palamas and beside it a magnificent neoclassical residence was built to plans by Ernst Ziller, appropriate for a consular mansion. In discussions that took place between the leaders of the Greek community of Thessaloniki, Andreas Syngros and the Greek consul Georgios Dokos, it was deemed essential for the consulate to remain on the same site in order to facilitate the covert collaboration of the community elders with the consulate. The foundations were laid in September 1892, and work was completed in August 1893. In 1894, it was rented by the city’s Greek community to the Hellenic state to house the Greek Consulate in Thessaloniki.

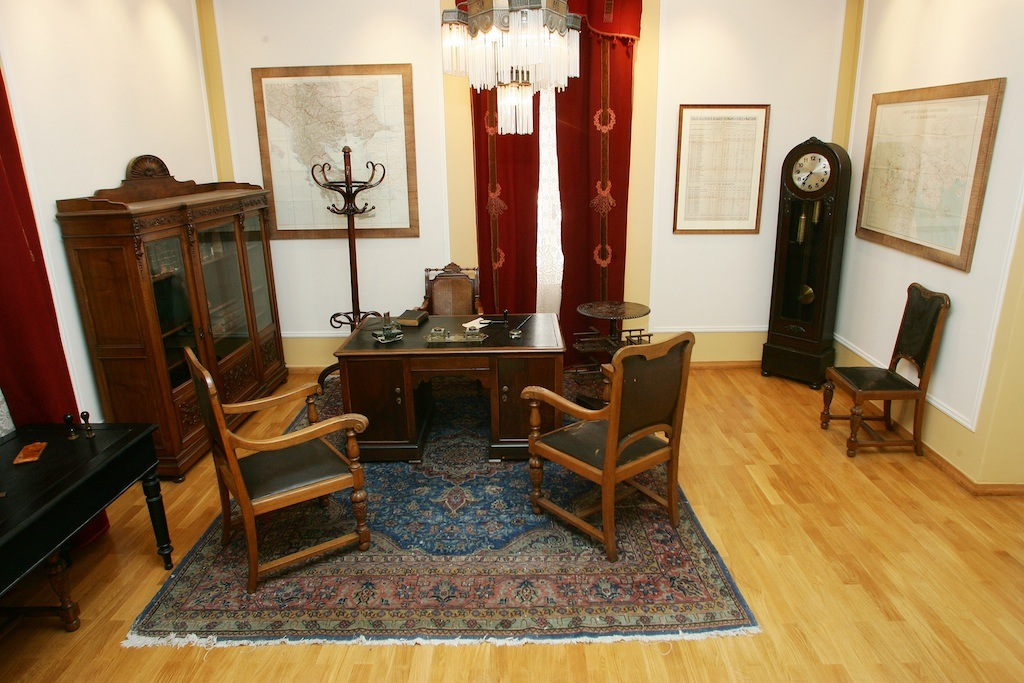
Consular Office of Lambros Koromilas.

The term of office of Lambros Koromilas (1904-1907) was of major importance because he organised the special secret services for the Greek Struggle for Macedonia within the consulates, known as the “centres”. The “centre” in Thessaloniki collaborated with the other “centres” in Macedonia and directed operations. It was staffed mainly by officers, who were in contact with local agents and armed bands. They were also in communication with the national committees that were staffed by the inhabitants of Macedonian villages and cities. The Consulate building frequently hosted fighters who entered unnoticed through a side door into the courtyard of the neighboring episcopal residence.

The importance of the work done by the Greek Consulate at that time is corroborated by the testimony of the protagonists in the Macedonian Struggle. The General Konstantinos Mazarakis-Ainian, then working as a “special clerk” at the consulate, reports in his memoirs: “My work began at the Consulate. From morning to midnight I was at work there. I met people coming in from the countryside. A little door in the courtyard communicated with the Cathedral. From there they were able to escape the eyes of the Turkish sentry in front of the Consulate. It was the office of information and advice about resistance against the Bulgarians…”

Alexandros Zannas, scion of one of the most eminent families in Thessaloniki, had been working for the national Greek cause since adolescence. In his memoirs he declared characteristically: “…We were very good friends with everybody who worked there… I used to see them all just about every day, because the secret postal service in Macedonia would stop by our house and usually either I or my brothers would then bring the mail to the Consulate… The letters were brought from the interior by various railway employees…and were handed over to Tsapoulas, a man from our village who owned the coffee shop opposite the railway station. My sister, a primary school teacher, would pick them up from him and bring them home… Then we’d take them to the Greek Consulate…”.

The successful activity of Lambros Koromilas alarmed the Ottoman authorities who demanded his departure in 1907. In the years to follow, however, the “centre” continued its task. During the period of the Young Turks, when the national struggle was being conducted by political representatives, the Greek internal organization was careful to act in secret, revealing its presence solely to selected officials.

The Balkan Wars brought victory to Greece and led to the union of Macedonia with Greece. Since the consular service was no longer required, the building was thereafter utilized for other purposes. In 1915, the Agricultural Bank of Macedonia operated on its ground floor and basement. In 1917, for a period of three years, it provided temporary accommodation to the National Bank of Greece until its branch, which was destroyed in the great fire that struck the city that same year, could be rebuilt.

In 1923, the 23rd Primary School was housed in the building. During the German Occupation (1941–1944), the Red Cross distributed food in the basement, and for a few months at the end of the Civil War (1949), the basement was used for the detention of political prisoners. In the decades that followed, it hosted a girls’ school, a night school and, since 1970, the 43rd Primary School.

== The museum ==
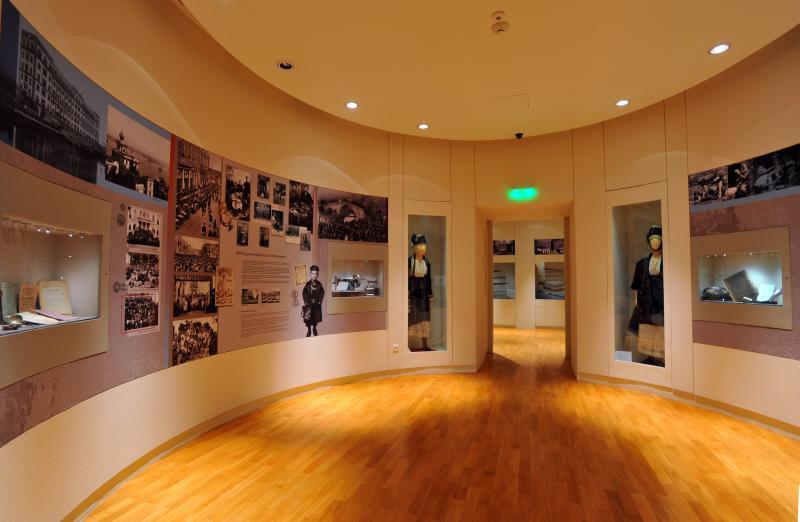
Museum of the Macedonian Struggle, Hall B.

Αs early as the 1930s, there were thoughts of creating a Museum of the Macedonian Struggle. The Macedonian Educational Brotherhood (1940) and later the Society for Macedonian Studies took an active part in establishing this museum. After the 1978 Thessaloniki earthquake, the building was judged unsuitable to house a school. In 1979, the society of “Friends of the Museum of the Macedonian Struggle” was established and a request made to use the building as a museum. The building was restored and became the Museum of the Macedonian Struggle in 1980, and was inaugurated in 1982 by Konstantinos Karamanlis, the Macedonia-born President of the Hellenic Republic and descendant of a fighter of the Macedonian Struggle

Since 1999 the museum has been run by the “Foundation for the Museum for the Macedonian Struggle”. With the new century the Foundation has initiated, in addition to its exhibition and publishing activity, new educational programmes and technologically innovative applications.

The museum is open Tuesday to Friday 09:00-14:00, Wednesday 18:00-20:00, Saturday and Sunday 11:00-14:30.

== The collection ==
The museum’s collection consists of rare 19th and 20th century artifacts related to everyday life in Macedonia, the weaponry and personal objects of fighters, as well as rare original documents from the period between 1770 and 1912. Part of the collection is displayed in the permanent exhibition, while the remaining artifacts are kept in the Research centre for Macedonian History and Documentation (KEMIT) and used in the Museum’s periodic exhibitions.

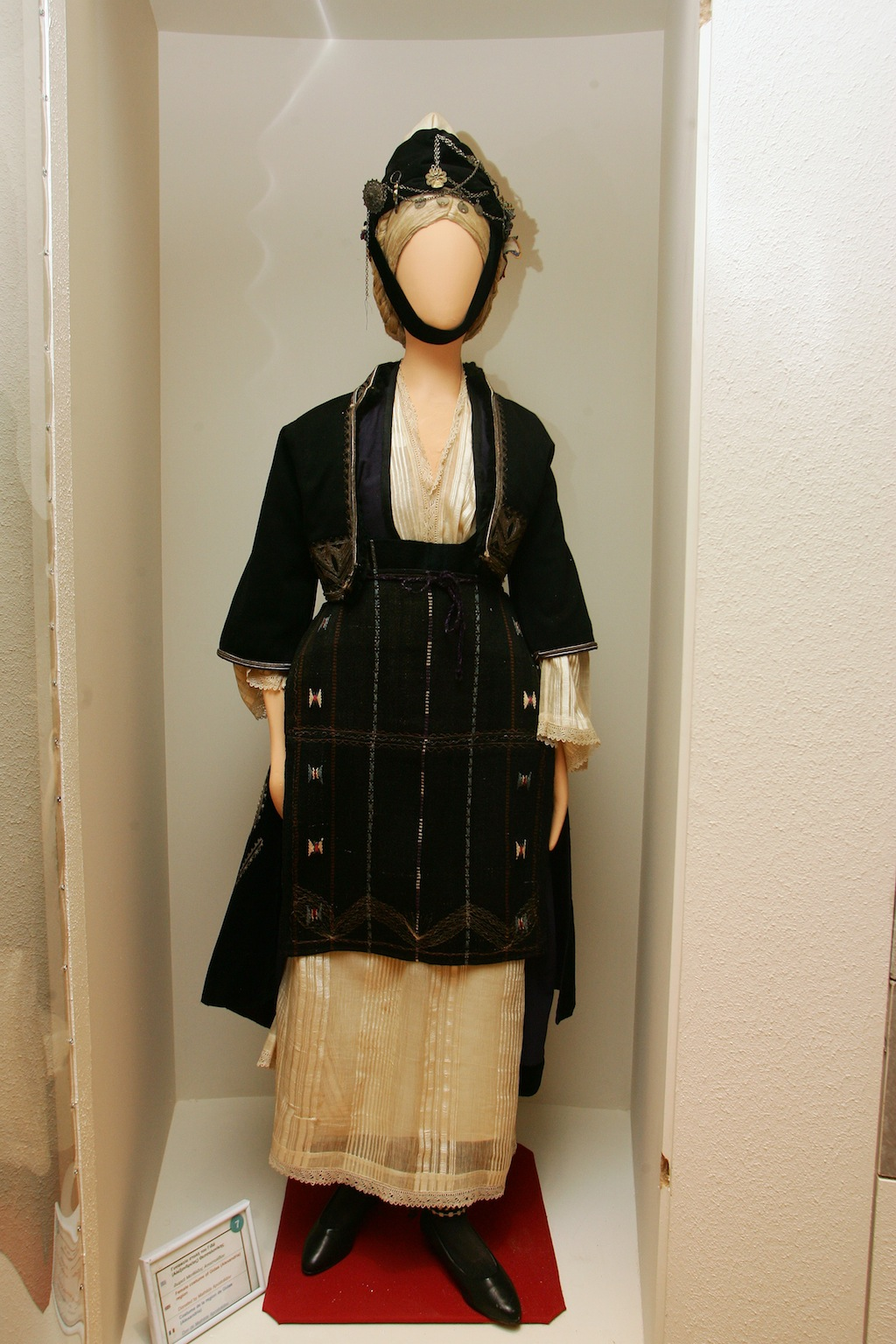
Traditional Macedonian costume from Alexandreia

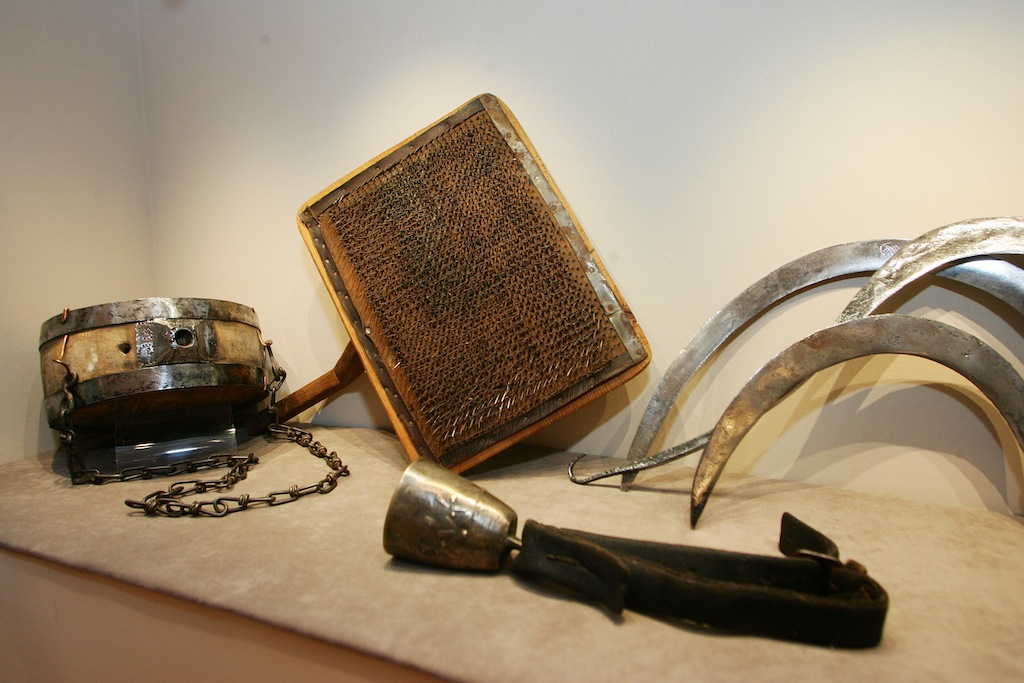
Farm tools

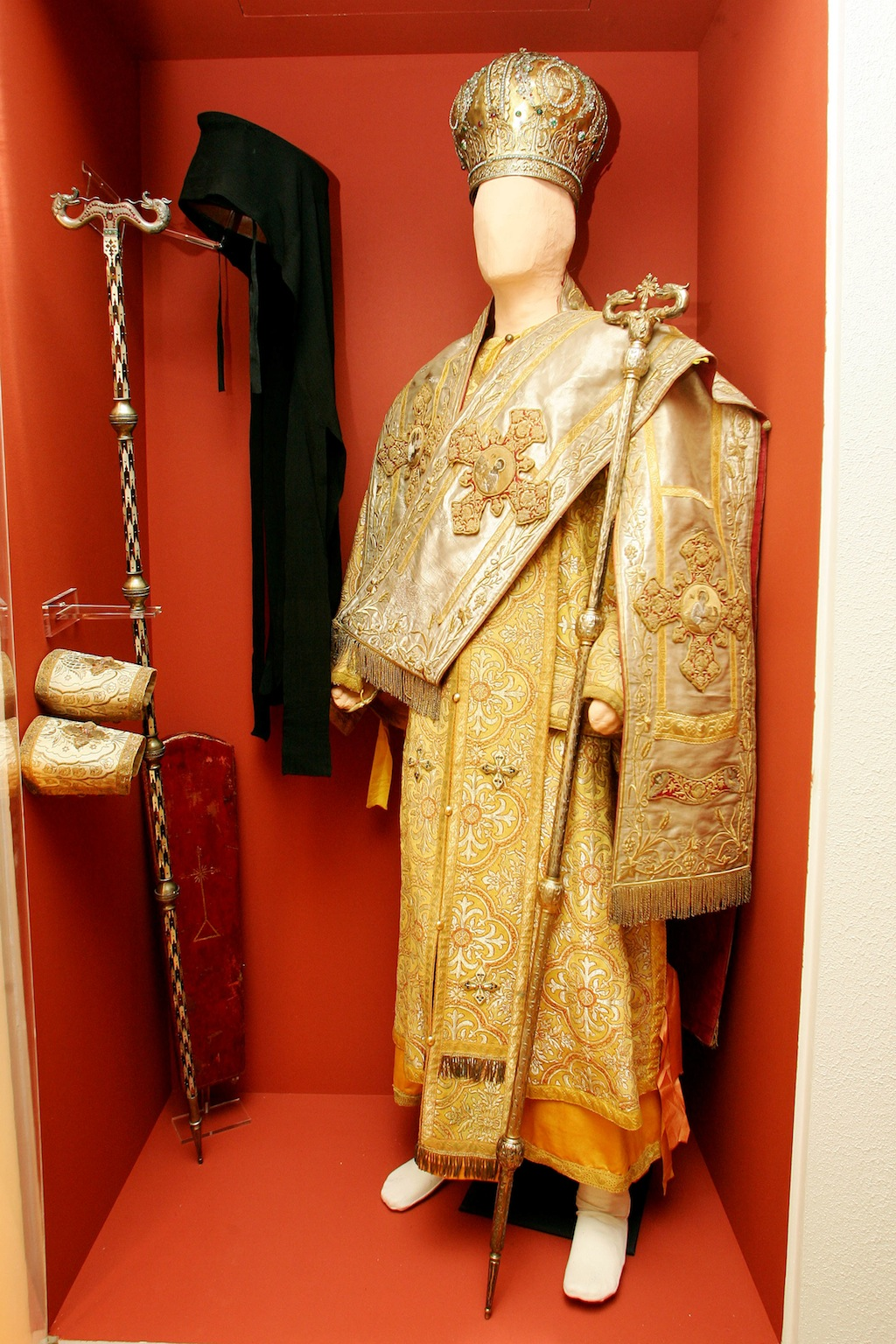
Ecclesiastical relics

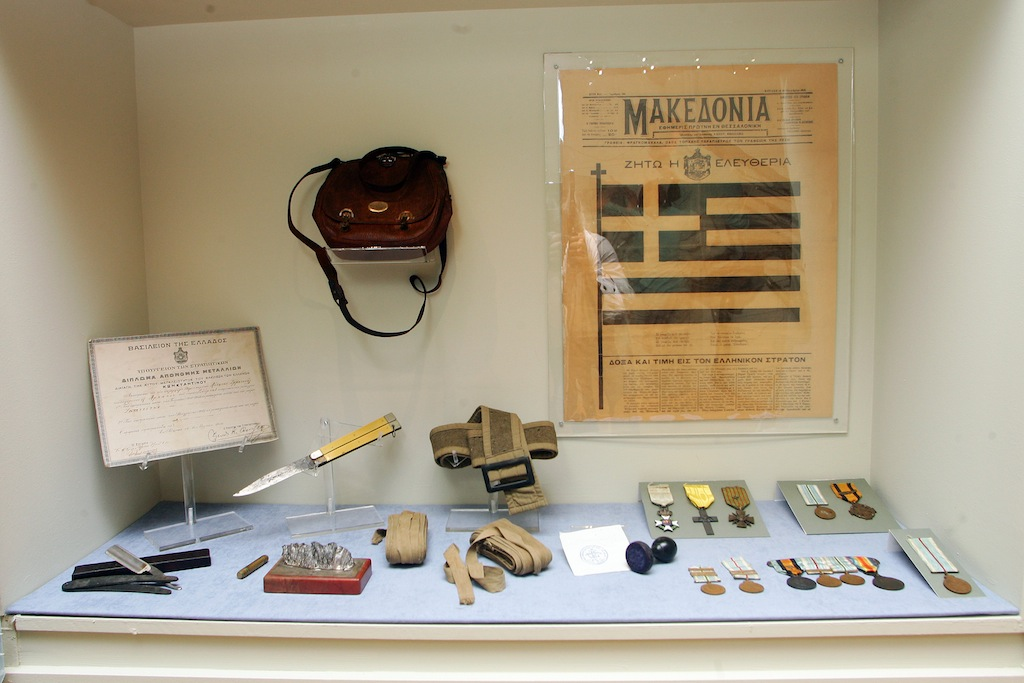
Military Equipment and an issue of the newspaper ΜΑΚΕΔΟΝΙΑ (MACEDONIA)

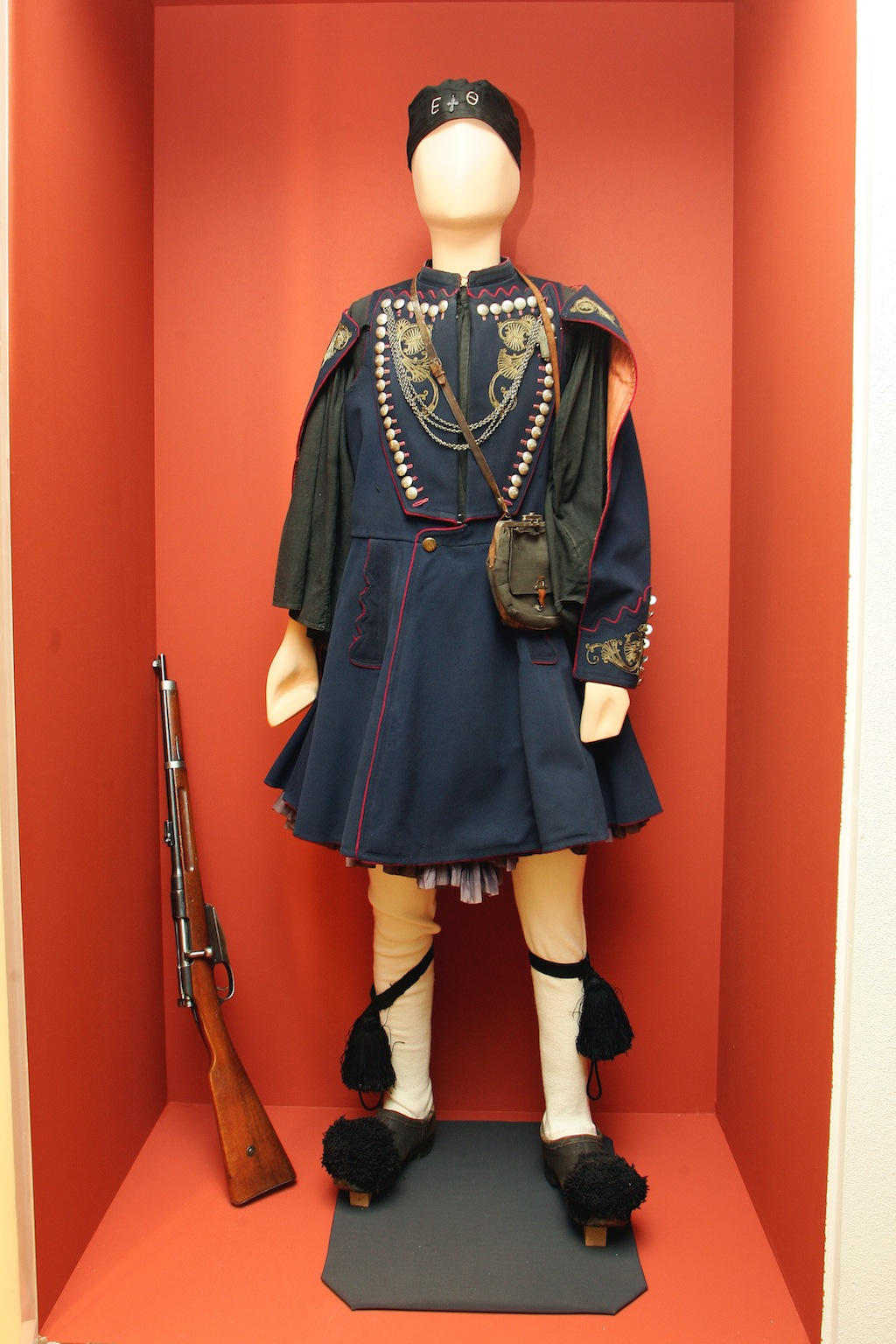
Costume of a Macedonian Fighter

== The exhibition ==
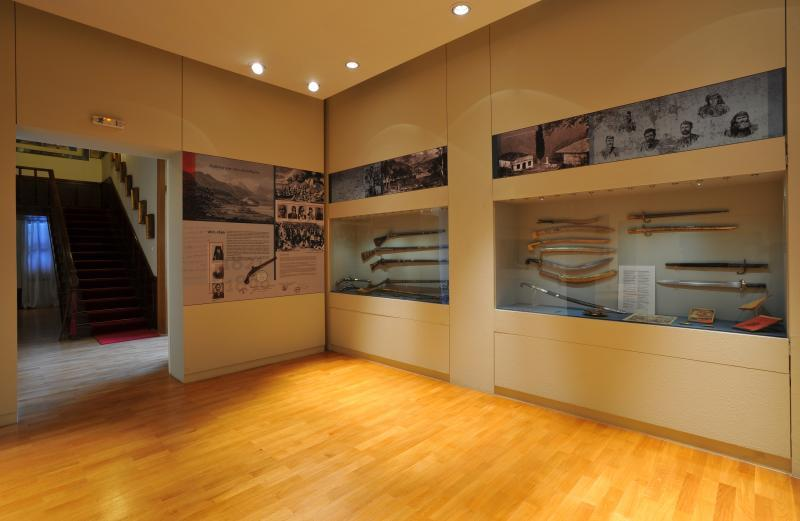
Museum of the Macedonian Struggle, Hall A

The presentation of the historical background in the first two rooms helps visitors understand the unconventional nature of the Macedonian Struggle. Its various aspects, constituent elements and principal actors are presented in the thematic units of the museum’s permanent exhibition, and particularly in those rooms devoted to the Makedonomachoi and their actions, to the senior and junior clergy, to the key role of the Greek Consulate-General in Thessaloniki and to the emblematic figure of Pavlos Melas. This is followed by brief units on the Young Turk movement, which marked the formal end of the armed phase of the Struggle with Bulgarian bands, and the Balkan Wars, which marked the end of the Ottoman presence in Macedonia in 1913. A brief documentary informs visitors on later historical developments. In the basement four full-scale dioramas familiarise visitors with everyday life in early 20th century Macedonia. The collection of the first floor includes military relics of the Balkan Wars belonging to Greek, Serb, Bulgarian and Ottoman Army. At the lecture room visitors will find a collection of hand-crafted models of vehicles and artillery used by the Greek Army. Furthermore, documentary films on various relevant topics are presented.

== Research centre for Macedonian History and Documentation ==
In 1988 the museum founded the Research centre for Macedonian History and Documentation (KEMIT) to promote the historical study of Macedonia and of the Macedonian Question in particular. This facility, which houses a specialized library, digitized resources and extensive archival material (Greek and international; public and private), is used by both scholars and students.

KEMIT’s archival material dates between 1770 and 1912. Also kept at KEMIT is the photographic archive that contains some 4,000 photographs of the people, cities, towns and villages of Macedonia in the 19th and 20th century.
