= András Visky =

Hungarian-Romanian poet, playwright and essayist

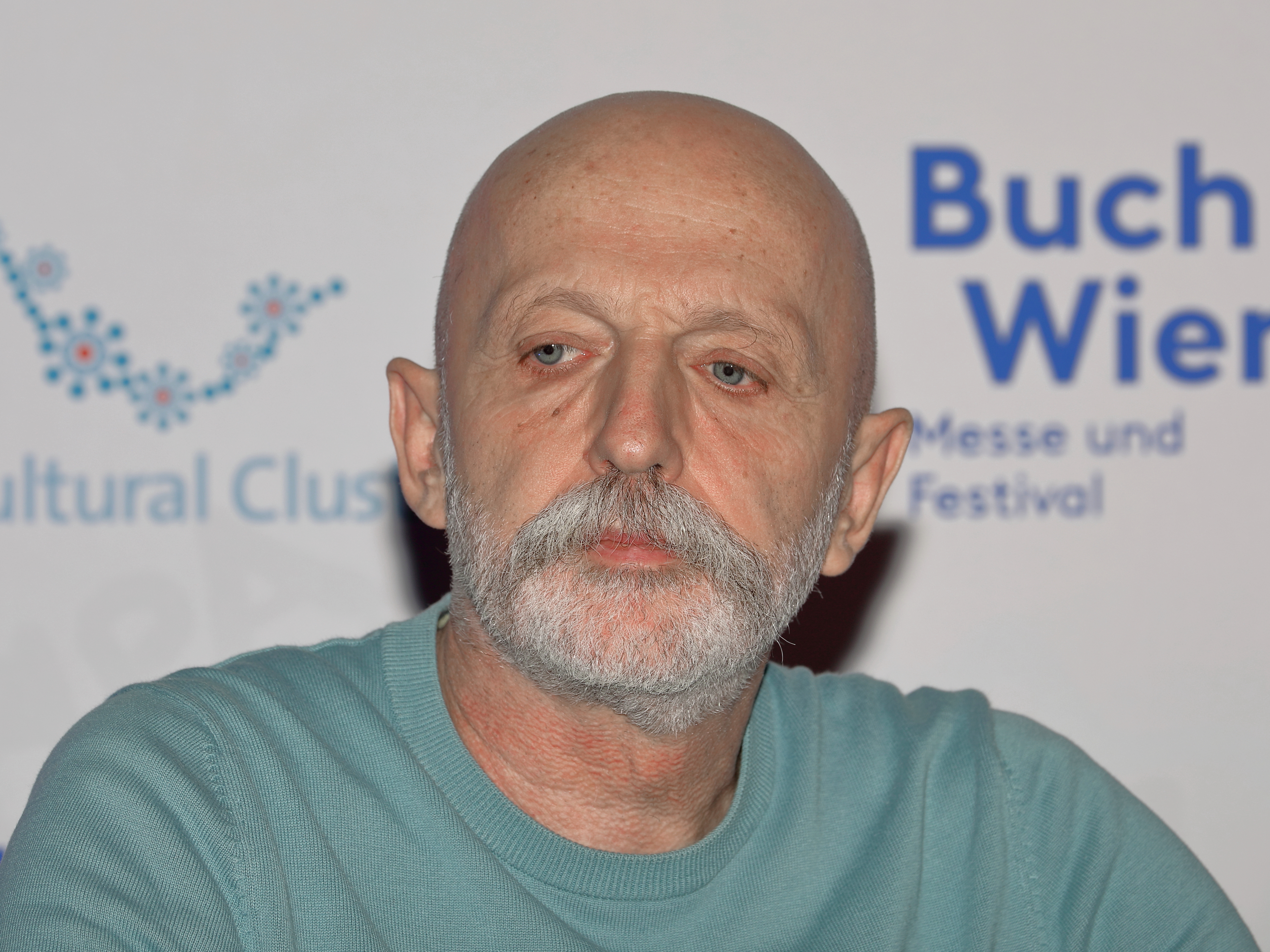
- Andras Visky at the Vienna Book Fair 2025
- Born: April 13, 1957 (age 69); Târgu-Mureş, Romania
- Occupations: Poet, playwright, essayist

András Visky (born April 13, 1957) is a Hungarian poet, playwright and essayist and resident dramaturg at Cluj-Napoca Hungarian Theatre, Romania, where he also holds the position of associate artistic director. His plays have been staged in several countries including Romania, Hungary, France, Italy, Poland, Slovenia, England, Scotland and the United States. He has a DLA (Doctor of Liberal Arts) from the University of Theatre and Film, Budapest and since 1994 he has lectured at the Babeş-Bolyai University in the Department of Theatre and Television. He is one of the co-founders and the former executive director of Koinónia Publishing.

== Childhood ==
Visky's father, Ferenc Visky, was a minister of the Hungarian Reformed Church who in 1958 was sentenced to 22 years in prison and forced labor by the Romanian Communist authorities for "the crime of organization against socialist public order." Shortly after, his wife and their seven children were deported to the Bărăgan (see Bărăgan deportations); Visky was only two years old at the time. In 1964, his father and other political prisoners were released during a short-lived period of relative thaw in which the regime relaxed its repressive policies. Visky himself was released the same year along with his mother and siblings.

== Professional life ==
Visky joined the Hungarian Theatre of Cluj as dramaturg in 1990. This was also the beginning of his long professional collaboration with Gábor Tompa, the artistic director of the theatre. The pair have worked together on innumerable performances, including plays by Shakespeare, Chekhov, Ionesco, Caragiale, Gombrowicz and Beckett, and Tompa has directed Visky's Júlia, Tanítványok, Hosszú péntek, Visszaszületés and Alkoholisták. Visky has also worked with directors Dragoş Galgoţiu, Mihai Măniuţiu, Robert Raponja, David Zinder, Robert Woodruff and Karin Coonrod.

For the 2009–2010 academic year, Visky was the Spoelhof Chair at Calvin College, Grand Rapids, Michigan, where he taught courses in playwriting and Hungarian and Romanian theatre. He has also led workshops or taught as a guest lecturer at the Moholy-Nagy University of Art and Design (Budapest), Northern Illinois University (DeKalb IL), the University of Michigan (Kalamazoo MI), the University of California, San Diego (CA), Yale School of Drama (New Haven CT), Károli Gáspár University (Budapest), Josai International University (Tokyo, Japan), and Osaka University (Osaka, Japan). In 2017 he spoke at the European Division of the Library of Congress.

== Plays ==
Over the course of his play writing, Visky has developed what he terms a "barrack dramaturgy". Having grown up in an eastern European gulag, he returns again and again in his plays to what it means to be a prisoner and the problem of being set free. His most well-known plays include Júlia (Juliet), Megöltem az anyámat (I Killed My Mother), Tanítványok (Disciples), Alkoholisták (Alcoholics), Visszaszületés (Born for Never or Backborn), Hosszú péntek (Long Friday), Pornó (Porn), and Caravaggio Terminal (Caravaggio Terminal). Notable productions include:

2017 - The Unburied. The Saint of Darkness, [Foreign Affairs], Rose Lipman Building, London, directed by Camila França & Trine Garrett.
2017 - I Killed My Mother - Spooky Action Theatre, Washington, D.C., directed by Natalia Gleason Nagy.
2017 - Júlia (Juliet) - Pesti Magyar Színház, Budapest.
2016 - The Unburied. The Saint of Darkness, a radio play - Above the Arts – Arts Theatre, London.
2016 - Megöltem az anyámat (I Killed My Mother) - Petőfi Theatre, Sopron, Hungary.
2016 - Pornó (Porn)- Teatr Nowy, Poznan, Poland.
2016 - Juliet – Ruse, Bulgaria.
2015 - Pornó (Porn)- Szatmári Északi Színház and the Harag György Társulat - Bethlen Téri Theatre, Budapest, Hungary..
2014 - Fatelessness, based on the novel by Imre Kertesz, adapted by Andras Visky and Adam Boncz - HERE Arts Center, New York.
2014 - Caravaggio Terminal (Caravaggio Terminal), a project by András Visky and Robert Woodruff - Hungarian Theatre of Cluj, directed by Robert Woodruff.
2013 - Juliet (English version of Júlia) - Sacred Playground Theatre Project, Edinburgh Fringe Festival, directed by Robin Witt.
2013 - I Killed My Mother (English version of Megöltem az anyámat) - Summer Dialogue Productions, Rosemary Branch Theatre, London, directed by Natalia Gleason.
2012 - Porn (English version of Pornó) - Theatre Y, Chicago, directed by Éva Patkó.
2012 - Ha lesz egy férfinak... (If A Man Has...) - Gólem Színház, Budapest, directed by András Borgula.
2012 - I Killed My Mother (English version of Megöltem az anyámat) - Theatre Y, La MaMa Experimental Theatre Club, New York, directed by Karin Coonrod.
2011 - Megöltem az anyámat (I Killed My Mother) - Hungarian Theatre of Cluj, created by Csilla Albert and Áron Dimény.
2010 - Alkoholisták (Alcoholics) - Hungarian Theatre of Cluj, directed by Gábor Tompa.
2010 - Juliet (English version of Júlia) - Theatre Y, Royal George Theatre, Chicago, directed by Karin Coonrod.
2010 - Backborn (English version of Visszaszületés) - Laboratory Theater, Calvin College, Grand Rapids MI, directed by Stephanie Sandberg.
2010 - I Killed My Mother (English version of Megöltem az anyámat) - Theatre Y, Greenhouse Theatre, Chicago, directed by Karin Coonrod.
2010 - Green Relief - Grand Rapids Art Museum, as part of the Art Plays project curated by Austin Bunn, directed by András Visky.
2009 - Visszaszületés (Born for Never) - Hungarian Theatre of Cluj, directed by Gábor Tompa.
2009 - Naitre à jamais (Born for Never) - Festival d'Avignon, where it won the award for best performance in the Off section, directed by Gábor Tompa.
2009 - Alkoholisták (Alcoholics) - Gárdonyi Géza Theatre of Eger, directed by Menyhért Szegvári.
2008 - Julieta (Romanian version of Júlia) - National Theatre of Iaşi, directed by Ioana Petcu.
2007 - Disciples (English version of TaníTVányok) - SummerNITE Company, Elgin Art Showcase, Chicago, directed by Christopher Markle.
2007 - Júlia (Juliet) - Tamási Áron Theatre, Sfântu Gheorghe, directed by László Bocsárdi.
2007 - Hosszú péntek (Long Friday) - Hungarian Theatre of Cluj, directed by Gábor Tompa.
2006 - Disciples (English version of TaníTVányok) - Laboratory Theater, Calvin College, Grand Rapids MI, directed by Stephanie Sandberg.
2006 - Juliet (English version of Júlia) - SummerNITE Company - Theatre Y, New American Theatre, Rockford IL, directed by Christopher Markle.
2005 - TaníTVányok (Disciples) - Hungarian Theatre of Cluj, directed by Gábor Tompa.
2005 - A szökés (The Escape), Tompa Miklós Company of the National Theatre of Târgu Mureş, directed by Éva Patkó.
2005 - Julieta (Romanian version of Júlia) - Cluj-Napoca National Theatre, directed by Mihai Măniuţiu.
2004 - A meg nem született (The unborn) - Vígszínház, Budapest, performed by János Kulka, with a guest performance in New York.
2003 - Vasárnapi iskola (Sunday School) - Hungarian Theatre of Cluj, directed by Gyōrgy Selmeczi.
2002 - Júlia (Juliet) - Thália Theatre, Budapest and Hungarian Theatre of Cluj, directed by Gábor Tompa. Special performances in Bucharest, New York, and Washington D.C.
2001 - TaníTVányok (Disciples), Csokonai Theatre, Debrecen, directed by József Jámbor.

His other plays include FényÁrnyék (Light/Shadow) and Betlehemi éjszaka (Bethlehem Night), a children's play.

== Dramaturgical credits at the Hungarian Theatre of Cluj ==
2013/2014 season
Caravaggio Terminal (Caravaggio Terminal), a project by András Visky and Robert Woodruff; directed by Robert Woodruff
Johannes von Tepl, A földműves és a halál (Death and the Ploughman), directed by Mihai Măniuțiu

2012/2013 season
After Caragiale, Leonida Gem Session (Leonida Gem Session), directed by Gábor Tompa

2011/2012 season
Charles L. Mee, Tökéletes menyegzõ (Perfect Wedding), directed by Karin Coonrod
Thomas Vinterberg, Mogens Rukov, Születésnap (Celebration), directed by Robert Woodruff
Róbert Lakatos, Cecília Felméri, Draculatour or The Brand Stroker Project, directed by Róbert Lakatos

2010/2011 season
Albert Camus, Caligula, directed by Mihai Măniuțiu
Marin Držić, Dundo Maroje, directed by Robert Raponja
Georg Büchner, Leonce és Léna (Leonce and Lena), directed by Gábor Tompa
András Visky, Alkoholisták (Alcoholics), directed by Gábor Tompa
Aristophanes, Lüszisztraté, avagy a nők városa (Lysistrata, or The City of Women), directed by Dominique Serrand

2008/2009 season
Anton Chekov, Három nővér (Three Sisters), directed by Gábor Tompa

2007/2008 season
Danilo Kiš, Borisz Davidovics síremléke (A Tomb for Boris Davidovich), directed by Robert Raponja
Henrik Ibsen, Peer Gynt, directed by David Zinder
Thomas Bernhard, A vadásztársaság (The Hunting Party), directed by Dragoş Galgoţiu

2006/2007 season
Énekek éneke (Song of Songs), directed by Mihai Măniuţiu
András Visky, Hosszú péntek (Long Friday), directed by Gábor Tompa

2005/2006 season
I. L. Caragiale, Az elveszett levél (The Lost Letter), directed by Gábor Tompa
András Visky, TaníTVányok (Disciples), directed by Gábor Tompa

2004/2005 season
Carlo Goldoni, A velencei terecske (The Little Square), directed by Mona Chirilă

2003/2004 season
Eugène Ionesco, Jacques vagy a behódolás (Jack, or The Submission), directed by Gábor Tompa

2002/2003 season
Benjamin Britten, György Selmeczi, András Visky, A vasárnapi iskola avagy Noé bárkája (The Sunday School or Noah's Ark), directed by György Selmeczi

2000/2001 season
William Shakespeare, Romeo és Júlia (Romeo and Juliet), directed by Attila Keresztes

1999/2000 season
Samuel Beckett, A játszma vége (Endgame), directed by Gábor Tompa
Molière, A mizantróp (The Misanthrope), directed by Gábor Tompa

1998/1999 season
William Shakespeare, A vihar (The Tempest), directed by Dragoş Galgoţiu

1997/1998 season
William Shakespeare, Troilus és Cressida (Troilus and Cressida), directed by Gábor Tompa

1996/1997 season
Eugène Ionesco, A székek (The Chairs), directed by Vlad Mugur
Mihály Vörösmarty, Csongor és Tünde (Csongor and Tünde), directed by Tibor Csizmadia

1995/1996 season
Lope de Vega, A kertész kutyája (The Gardener's Dog), directed by László Bocsárdi
Ferenc Molnár, Liliom, directed by István Kövesdy
Witold Gombrowicz, Operett (Operetta), directed by Gábor Tompa
Péter Kárpáti, Méhednek gyümölcse (The Fruit of Your Womb), directed by László Bérczes

1994/1995 season
Milán Füst, Máli néni (Mrs. Mali), directed by Árpád Árkosi
Mihail Bulgakov, Képmutatók cselszövése (The Intrigue of the Hypocrites), directed by Gábor Tompa
William Shakespeare, Vízkereszt (Twelfth Night), directed by Victor Ioan Frunză
Carlo Goldoni, Csetepaté Chioggiában (The Chioggia Scuffles), directed by Árpád Árkosi

1993/1994 season
János Székely, Mórok (Moors), directed by Gábor Tompa

1992/1993 season
Ervin Lázár, Bab Berci kalandjai (The Adventures of Bab Berci), directed by István Mózes
William Shakespeare, Szentivánéji álom (A Midsummer Night's Dream), directed by Gábor Tompa
László Márton, A nagyratörő (The Ambitious), directed by Miklós Parászka
Sándor Hunyady, Erdélyi kastély (Transylvanian Castle), directed by Gábor Dehel

1991/1992 season
Eugène Ionesco, A kopasz énekesnő (The Bald Prima Donna), directed by Gábor Tompa

1990/1991 season
Slawomir Mrozek, Rendőrség (The Police), directed by Árpád Árkosi
William Shakespeare, Ahogy tetszik (As You Like It), directed by Gábor Tompa

== Published works ==
Mint aki látja a hangot. Visky Andrással beszélget Sipos Márti (Like One Who Hears Sound. András Visky talks with Márti Sipos.), Budapest: 2009
Megváltozhat-e egy ember (Theatre and transformation), essays. Cluj: 2009
Gyáva embert szeretsz (Loving a Coward), poems. Pécs: 2008
Juliet. A Dialogue, play. Carol Stream, IL: Theatre Y, 2007
Tirami sù. Két monológ: Júlia és Megöltem az anyámat (Tiramisu. Two monologs: Juliet and I Killed My Mother) Cluj: 2006
A szökés. Három dráma: A szökés, Tanítványok és Alkoholisták (The Escape. Three plays: The Escape, Disciples and Alcoholics) Cluj: 2006
Júlia (Juliet), play. Budapest: 2003
Ha megh (If I Should Die), poems. Cluj: 2003
Fals tratat de convietuire (A False Treaty for Co-existence), novel in Romanian with Daniel Vighi and Alexandru Vlad. Cluj: 2002
Írni és (nem) rendezni (To Write and (Not) Direct), writings on the theory of theatre, Cluj: 2002
Betlehemi éjszaka (Bethlehem Night), children's story. Cluj, 1999. This title also appeared in English and Romanian.
Aranylevél (Golden Leaf), poems. Budapest, Cluj: 1999
Goblen (Goblen), poems. Pécs: 1998
Reggeli csendesség (Morning Quiet), essays. Budapest: 1996
Hamlet elindul (Hamlet Sets Off), theatre criticism and studies. Târgu Mureş, Chicago: 1996
Romániai magyar négykezesek (Romanian Hungarian Pieces for Four Hands), poems with Gábor Tompa. Pécs: 1994
Hóbagoly (Great White Owl), poems. Budapest: 1992
Fotóiskola haladóknak (Photo School for the Advanced), poems. Bucharest: 1988. Patraszállás (Disembarkation), poems. Bucharest: 1982

As editor:
De la Shakespeare la Sarah Kane. Teatrul National din Cluj. Spectacole din perioda 2000-2007/De Shakespeare à Sarah Kane. Le Théâtre National de Cluj. Spectacles de a période 2000-2007/From Shakespeare to Sarah Kane. The National Theatre of Cluj. Performances from 2000 to 2007. Cluj: Koinónia Publishing, 2008
Színház és rítus (Theatre and Ritual), studies in the theatre of Áron Tamási. Sfântu Gheorge: 1997
Kolozsvár magyar színháza (The Hungarian Theatre of Cluj), with co editors Lajos Kántor and József Kōtő. Cluj: 1992
A hely szelleme (The Spirit of Place), an anthology of contemporary Hungarian drama. Cluj: 1992

As contributor:
The Routledge Companion to Dramaturgy, edited by Magda Romanska. Routledge: 2014
Testre szabott élet – Nádas Péter Saját halál és Párhuzamos történetek című műveiről (Studies on the works of Péter Nádas), edited by Péter Rácz I. Budapest: 2007
Tolnai-Szimpózium (Tolnai Symposium), edited by Beáta Thomka. Budapest, 2004
Central Europe Now!, almanac from Young Writers' Meeting. Archa Bratislava: 1994
Felūtés. Írások a magyar alternatív színházról (Upbeat. Writings About Alternative Hungarian Theatre), edited by Tibor Várszegi. Budapest, 1992
Fordulatok. Magyar Színházak 1992 (Turnings. Hungarian Theatre 1992), edited by Tibor Várszegi. Budapest: 1992
Új Magyar Shakespeare-tár I (New Hungarian Shakespeare Collection I), edited by Tibor Fabiny and István Géher. Budapest: 1988

== Awards, honors ==
2016 - Made a member of the Hungarian Academy of Sciences
2009 - József Attila Award
2008 - Bánffy Miklós Award
2007 - Special Prize of the jury of the National Theatre Festival of Pécs
2004 - ARTISJUS Award
2002 - Szép Ernő Award
2002 - Károli Gáspár Award
2001 - Salvatore Quasimodo Special Award
1995 - Soros Foundation Award
1993 - Poesis Award
1993 - IRAT ALAP Award
1993 - Európa 1968 Award
