= Royal Theatre (Thessaloniki) =

Coordinates: 40.6251°N 22.9494°E

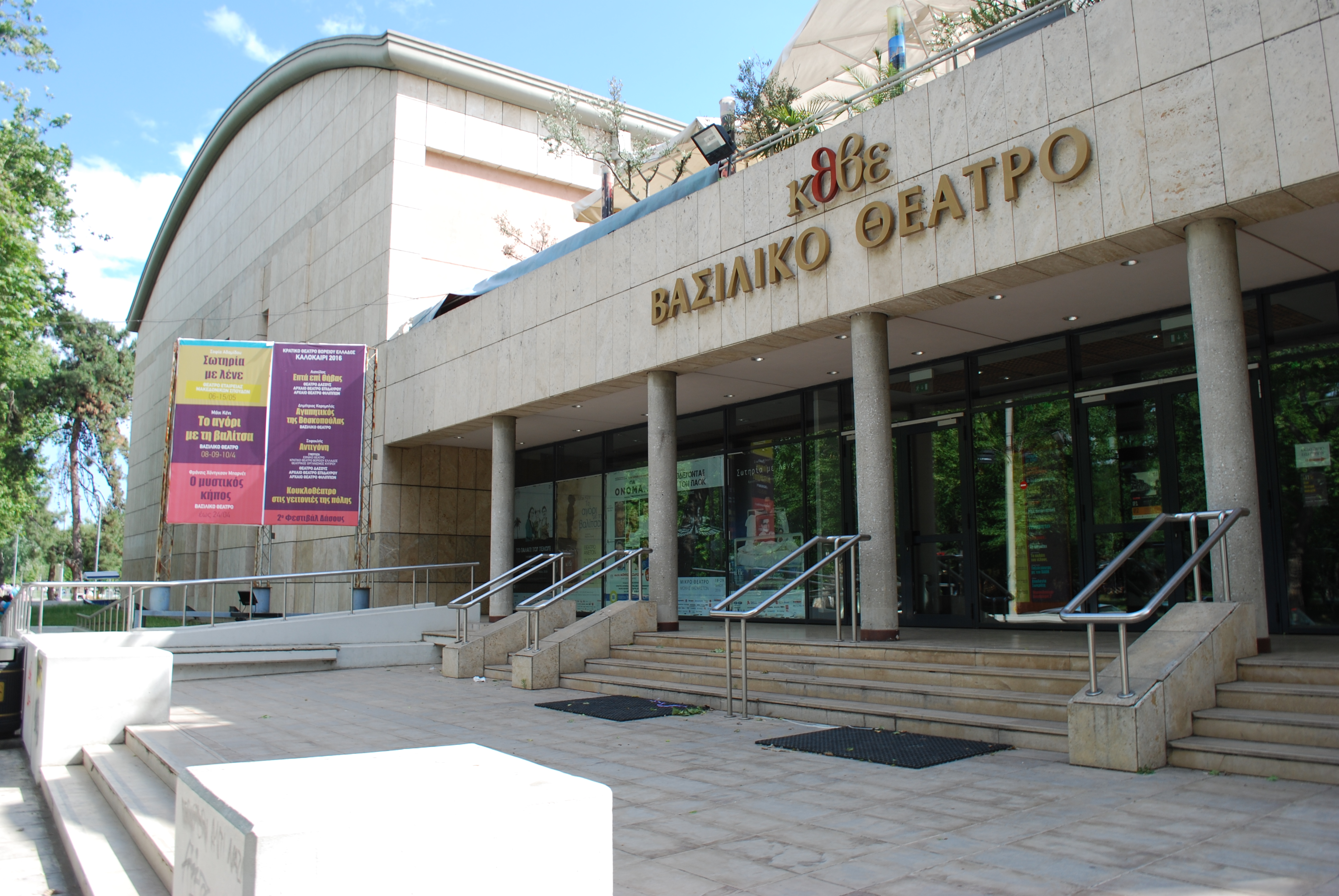

General information
- Address: 2, 30th October Avenue, Thessaloniki

The Royal Theatre of Thessaloniki (Greek:Βασιλικό Θέατρο Θεσσαλονίκης) is the seat of the National Theatre of Northern Greece and one of the institution’s winter stages. It is located at 2, 30 October Avenue in White Tower Square in Thessaloniki and has a capacity of 683 seats.

== History ==
It was built by the architect and urban planner Konstantinos Doxiadis and was originally intended to serve as the summer stage of the National Theatre in Thessaloniki, but it was quickly changed to function as a winter stage.

In 1940 the construction was completed and in July of the same year the theatre was inaugurated with the staging of the Shakespeare's Richard III play, starring Alexis Minotis. During the years of Nazi Occupation, it initially housed various cultural events of the German authorities and as of 1943 it became the headquarters of the Thessaloniki State Theatre.

In 1961/62, it served for a short time as the first seat of the Theatre of the Society for Macedonian Studies, which was then moved to the theatre of the Society of Macedonian Studies since the Royal Theatre was considered unsuitable due to the damage it had suffered through the years. In the years that followed, it served as a venue for rehearsals and for storage and was gradually abandoned. In 1986, restoration work was undertaken in connection with the 2nd Biennale of Young Artists from the European Mediterranean Countries and subsequently the building became one of the stages of the State Theater of Northern Greece. In 1996, the restoration of the building was carried out by the architects K. Kouroussopoulos and N. Scholidis. The inauguration took place in 2000.

Since then, the theatre has been the permanent seat of the State Theater of Northern Greece, featuring a multi-purpose stage (suitable for performances, concerts, movies, etc.), a reception hall, a foyer and various rooms used for various events such as exhibitions, conferences, lectures, etc. The building also hosts the library of the institution, with an area of about 60 m^{2} (650 sq ft) and a reading room.
