= Sokratis Karantinos =

Greek theatre director, critic, drama school teacher, and actor (1906-1979)

Sokratis Karantinos (Greek: Σωκράτης Καραντινός; Athens, 1906 – Athens, June 2, 1979) was a Greek theatre director, theatre critic, drama school teacher and actor. He was involved with the foundation and the early years of operation of the National Theatre of Northern Greece (NTNG), of which he served as the inaugural artistic director (1961–1967).

== Biography ==
He was born in Athens and lived in Istanbul with his family until 1914. He was the son of the owner of the Olympia Theatre and theatrical entrepreneur Nikolaos Karantinos and brother of the architect Patroklos Karantinos (1903 –1976).

As a teenager he became involved in amateur theatre and took up acting lessons. This was followed by theatrical studies abroad (Germany, France and Austria) where he occasionally worked as a correspondent for Greek art magazines. He permanently returned to Greece in 1933. He made his first attempts at directing and taught in schools and at drama schools. At the same time he continued writing reviews for art magazines.

As a director Karantinos first worked with the National Theatre of Greece, the National Opera and various companies of the independent theatre (Katerina Andreadi's company, G. Karousos' Greek Theatre Company, etc.). In 1961 he took over the artistic direction of the then newly founded National Theatre of Northern Greece in Thessaloniki, a position he held until 1967. During both his tenure as artistic director and following his departure from that position he also worked at the NTNG. as a director, staging more than fifteen theatrical productions. In December 1972 he became artistic advisor and director at the Cyprus Theatre Organisation (THOC), where he remained until 1974.

He received several awards for his services to the theatre. He was awarded the Order of the Phoenix – Cross of Taxiarches and the Silver Medal of the Academy of Athens. On the October 30 Avenue in Thessaloniki stands a monument dedicated to his name, while the central stage of the NTNG. in the premises of the Lazaristes Monastery in the suburb of Stavroupoli near Thessaloniki City Center is named after him.

He died on June 2, 1979, in Athens.

== Bibliography ==
- Glytzouris, Antonis (2014). Η σκηνοθετική τέχνη στην Ελλάδα (2η έκδοση). Heraklion: Crete University Press. ISBN 978-960-524-330-2.
- Karantinos, Sokratis (1974). Σαράντα χρόνια θέατρο I: στον προθάλαμο. Σκαμπανεβάσματα Α' 1920–1946. Athens.
