= Asterios Peltekis =

Greek actor

Asterios Peltekis (born 1974, Thessaloniki) is a Greek actor, director and theater expert. Since 2022 he is the artistic director of the National Theater of Northern Greece.

== Biography ==
He studied at the Higher School of Dramatic Art of the National Theater of Northern Greece (NTNG) and at the Theater Department of the School of Fine Arts of the Aristotle University of Thessaloniki, while he participated with a scholarship in the Union of the Theatres of Europe, in a workshop, together with Peter Brook and Bruce Meyers, on plays by Shakespeare (acting-directing). He is a PhD candidate at the Ionian University in cultural management.

His career includes theatrical performances at the NTNG, the National Theatre, the Theatrical Organization of Cyprus, the Onassis Foundation Shelter, etc. On television, he has participated in the show Βότανα, μυστικά και θεραπείες (Herbs, Secrets and Remedies), as well as in series such as: Dikaiosi, Heroides, Koukles, O Prigkipas tis Fotias, Symmathites , San Oikogenia, Skhedon Pote, LAPD, I Tourta tis Mamas, I Gi tis Elias. He has also appeared in movies, telefilms and television commercials.

He teaches in theater workshops and drama schools. Since 2022 he is the artistic director at NTNG.
