= Art Gallery of the Society for Macedonian Studies =

- Πινακοθήκη Εταιρείας Μακεδονικών Σπουδών
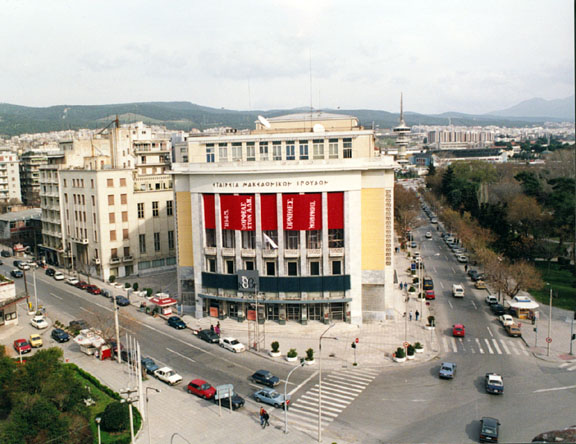
- Outside view
- Established: 1975
- Location: Thessaloniki, Greece
- Coordinates: 40.62657926509506°N 22.94999396500379°E
- Type: Art museum
- Collection size: 400+ works
- Founder: Society for Macedonian Studies
- Architect: Vassilis Kassandras

The Art Gallery of the Society for Macedonian Studies (Greek: Πινακοθήκη Εταιρείας Μακεδονικών Σπουδών) is a museum in Thessaloniki, Greece, founded in 1975. It was the first organised visual art institution in the city of Thessaloniki, its purpose being to promote and disseminate modern Greek art, mainly that of northern Greece. It occupies the top floor of the building that also houses the State Theatre of Northern Greece. The building was designed by the architect Vassilis Kassandras and stands directly opposite the White Tower on the sea-front.

== Exhibits ==
The collection comprises more than 400 works, mainly paintings, sculptures and engravings, mostly by artists from Thessaloniki and Macedonia in general, though there are also works by major artists from the rest of Greece and other countries. Works by foreign artists are selected by virtue of their connection with the city, i.e. they depict monuments or landscapes of Thessaloniki. Most of the artwork has been donated, some purchased, and at one time quite a number of works were bequeathed to the gallery. Early in 1999, it was augmented by works from the Papanakos Collection.

There is space to display only 150 works, yet the exhibition presents an entirely satisfactory picture of the basic orientations of visual expression in northern Greece, as also of the development of modern Greek art since 1850. A sample of the artists includes Tassos Kyriazopoulos, Spyros Vassiliou, Thalia Flora-Karavia, Nikos Sachinis, Émile Gerlach, Giorgos Apotsos, Kostas Karanos, Anna Christoforidou, Kyriakos Kabadakis, and Apostolos Kilessopoulos.

The gallery extends its interest to organizing solo and group periodic exhibitions to promote contemporary art.

== Gallery ==
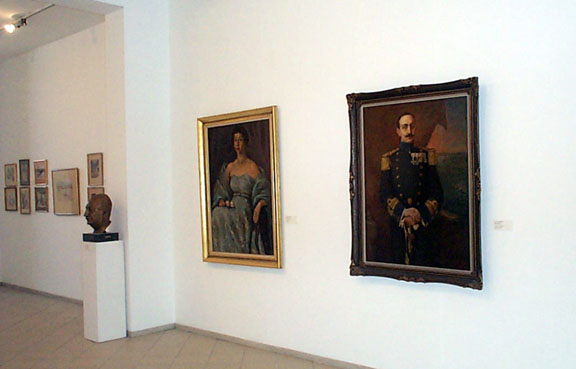
First room

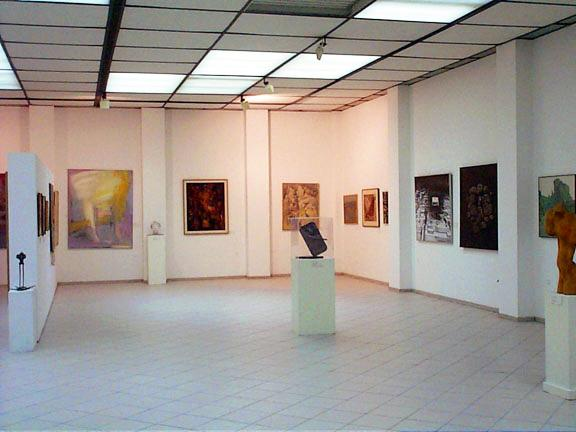
Second room

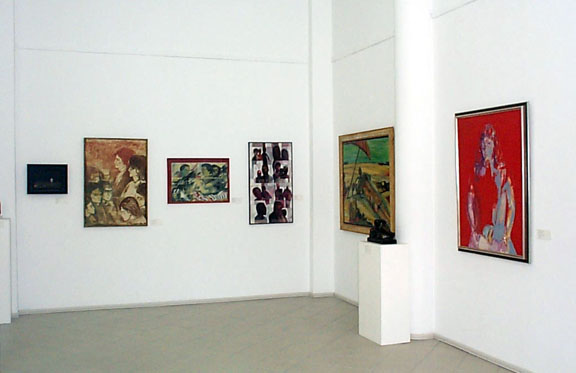
Fourth room
