= Conference Hall of the Senate, in March 1904 =

1904 painting by Asterio Mañanós Martínez

Salón de Conferencias del Senado, en marzo de 1904
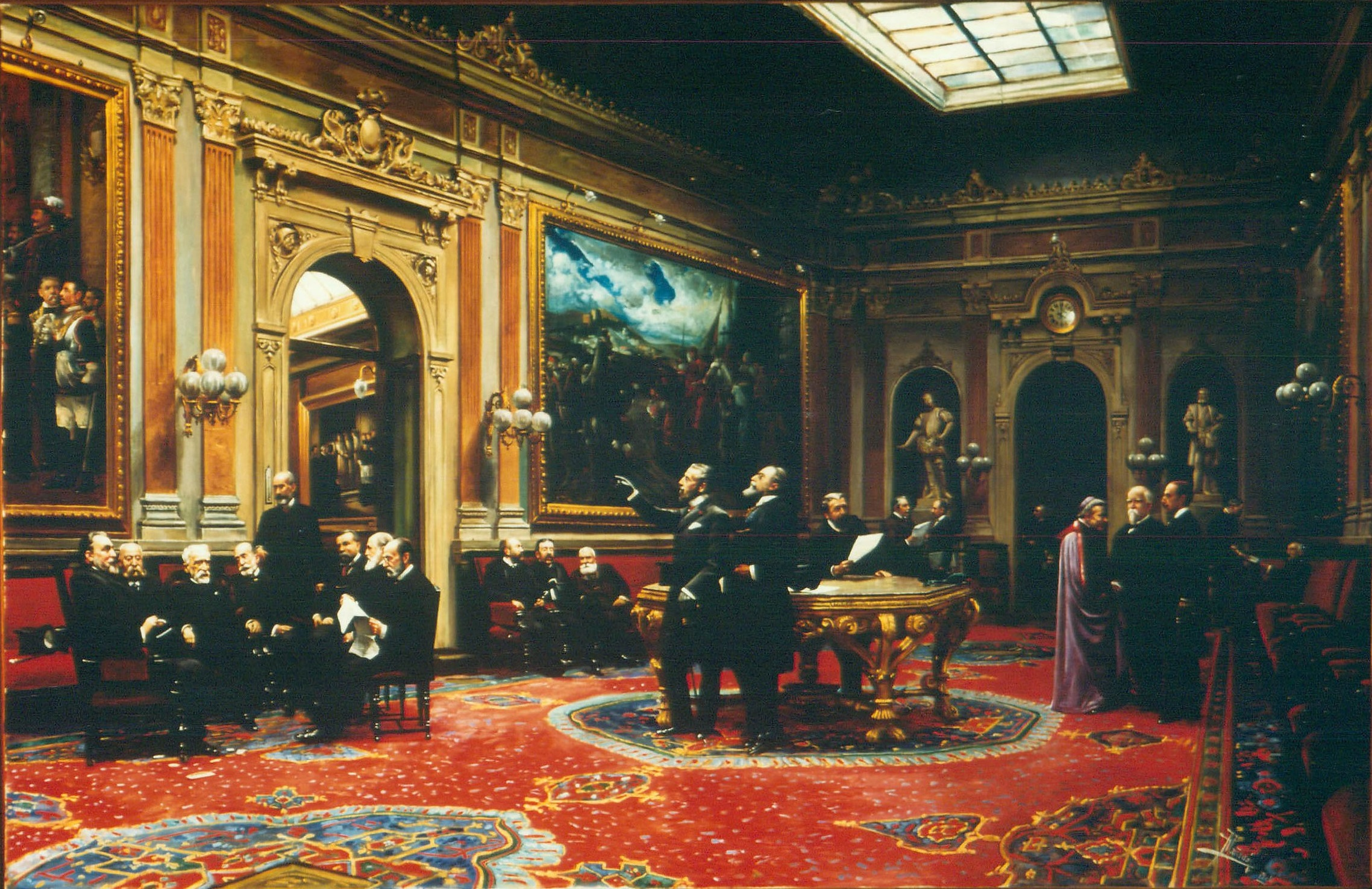
- Artist: Asterio Mañanós Martínez
- Year: 1904
- Medium: Oil on canvas
- Dimensions: 92 cm × 142 cm (36 in × 56 in)
- Location: Palacio del Senado; Madrid

Conference Hall of the Senate, in March 1904 (Spanish: Salón de Conferencias del Senado, en marzo de 1904) is a painting by the Spanish artist Asterio Mañanós Martínez made in that same year. It is the first work that Mañanós would make as part of a series of six works on political life that make up his most interesting contribution to Spanish art.

The painting, an oil on canvas measuring 92 x 142 cm, faithfully reproduces the Conference Hall, or Salón de los Pasos Perdidos, of the Palace of the Senate of Spain. In it are a series of politicians and personages of the time, as well as two of the actual paintings found in the room: The Oath to the Constitution (on the left) and The Surrender of Granada (on the right), the latter whose restoration Martinez had helped with.

The painting itself is housed in the Palace of the Senate.
