= Research Centre for Macedonian History and Documentation =

The Research Centre for Macedonian History and Documentation (KEMIT) is a research centre and library housed in the building of the Museum for the Macedonian Struggle Foundation in Thessaloniki, Central Macedonia, Greece.

It maintains a specialised library and electronic databases, collects and processes archival material, publishes monographs and studies, organises seminars and conferences, and provides information and documentation to interested parties.

The library and archives are open to the public every day, but archival research requires a permit, as does the copying of photographic or documentary material. Archival material may also be subject to further restrictions, depending on the specific unit. Books may not be removed from the library. The Museum does, however, have collections of photographs (copies) and video films available for loan to teachers.

The Research Centre for Macedonian History and Documentation (KEMIT) is overseen by an Academic Committee.
