= Karin Coonrod =

American theater director and writer

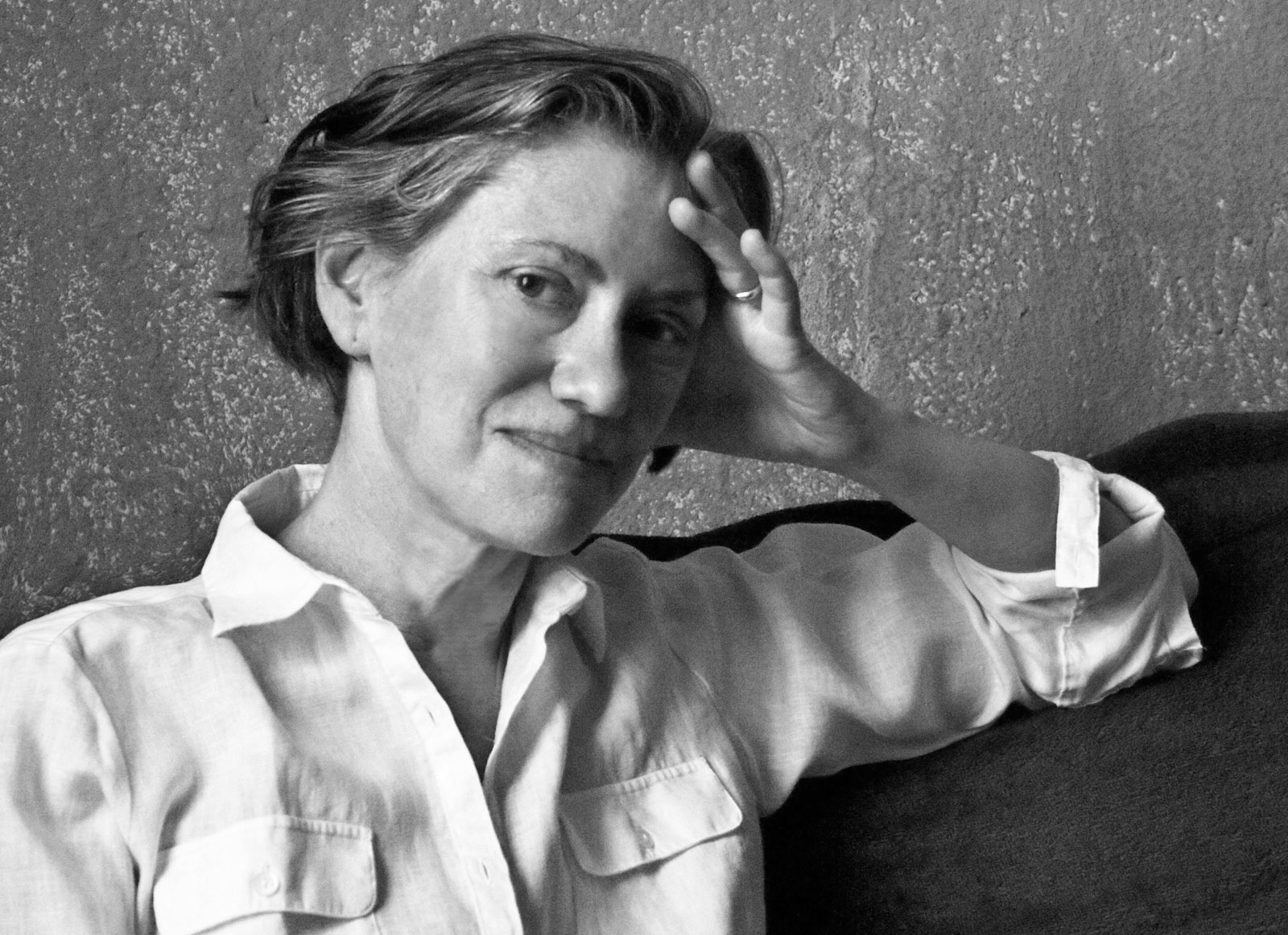
- Education: Gordon College (BA); Columbia University (MA)
- Occupations: Theatre director; playwright
- Employer: Compagnia de' Colombari David Geffen School of Drama at Yale
- Website: www.karincoonrod.com

Karin Coonrod is an American theater director and writer who is on the faculty of the David Geffen School of Drama at Yale. Coonrod is known for her modern adaptations of classic plays by William Shakespeare and other playwrights. She often chooses to direct plays produced from unusual sources such as lesser-known works by notable playwrights, creating/devising adaptations from non-dramatic sources, and the writings of notable figures in history.

Coonrod founded two theater companies: Arden Party (1987–1997) and Compagnia de' Colombari (2004–present). She has also directed several productions presented by Theatre for a New Audience. Her plays have been staged at several notable theaters including the Joseph Papp Public Theater, New York Theatre Workshop, Brooklyn Academy of Music, Ohio Theater, American Repertory Theatre, and Folger Theatre.

== Early life ==
Born to an Italian mother from Florence and an American father from Michigan City, Indiana, Coonrod grew up living between her parents' native homes in Europe and the Midwestern United States. She earned her undergraduate degree in English from Gordon College.

== Career ==
Coonrod began her career as a teacher at an all-boys Catholic school in Monmouth County, New Jersey where she also ran the school's theater program. She later enrolled in a graduate theater program at Columbia University. While working on her master's degree, in 1987, she founded an experimental classical theatre company, Arden Party. First based in an old movie theater in Sandy Hook, New Jersey, Arden Party gained wider notoriety when, in 1988, the company moved to the Ohio Theater, then located in SoHo, Manhattan. By 1996, Coonrod had staged more than 20 adaptations of classic plays.

In the late 1990s, Coonrod began earning critical acclaim for her productions of more obscure works by the English playwright William Shakespeare, such as Henry VI (1996) and King John (2000). She also directed other uncommon plays by lesser-known European playwrights and adaptations from atypical sources.

Coonrod founded her second New York-based theater company, Compagnia de' Colombari in 2004—made up of an international company of theater makers with whom she produces the majority of her later plays. Her experimental theatrical style sometimes calls for the musicians and stage crew to operate in full view of the audience, serving as part of the ensemble cast, called "Black Angels". Her plays often break the fourth wall to include the audience. In her plays, the cast of actors often play multiple roles, as in Henry VI, or the same role is fractured among several actors, as in Merchant of Venice and texts&beheadings/ElizabethR.

Coonrod describes her trade as "staging sculpture" because it combines two of her artistic interests—visual depiction and the narrative form. She frequently uses unusual seating structures like in the 2014 production of Tempest where Coonrod placed the stage between two sets of audiences facing each other, reminiscent of the school gymnasiums where she first directed plays with her young Catholic school students. Coonrod also stages her plays in unusual locales and settings that come from the script's themes. There were performances of the Shakespeare's Merchant of Venice in the piazza of the play's eponymous city in a neighborhood that once was a Jewish ghetto. Her theater company later reproduced the play at a high-security prison in Padova with "only actors and inmates in a bare room".

== Works ==
=== Arden Party ===
In 1996, Coonrod staged two plays, Victor, or Children Take Over by French surrealist playwright Roger Vitrac and Henry VI by Shakespeare. Victor, or Children Take Over was staged in Spring 1996 at the Ohio Theater and was adapted with a translation by Coonrod, Aaron Etra, Esther Sobin, and Frederic Maurin. The play was a critical success. Ben Brantley of The New York Times described it as "a smashing (in every sense of the word) revival" and "a subversive take on haute bourgeois chic." Henry VI was staged at the Joseph Papp Public Theater, opening on December 18, 1996. Part of the New York Shakespeare Festival, Coonrod's adaptation condensed the tripartite play into two three-hour segments, "Part I: The Edged Sword" and "Part II: Black Storm."

In December 1997, Coonrod directed Christmas at the Ivanovs, a rarely performed absurdist play by Aleksandr Vvedensky from 1938 which she translated with Julia Listengarten. According to The New York Times' Peter Marks, Coonrod was "an excellent match" for the play and turned "the acerbic piece into an out-there fairy tale." He described the rendition as "brisk and lighthearted even when the playwright is at his most nihilistic."

=== 2000–2005, Theatre for a New Audience ===
Coonrod later directed Shakespeare's King John, presented by the Theatre for a New Audience (TFANA), which opened on January 30, 2000, at The American Place Theatre. The following year, Coonrod's 2001 dramatization of the triptych of short stories Everything That Rises Must Converge unconventionally follows the text "word for word." This included "the attributions—he said, she said—and often the [narrator]'s omniscient intrusions that reveal a character's mind." The author Flannery O'Connor died in 1964, and her estate made strict adherence to the words in the text a precondition for allowing the dramatization to be staged. According to The Village Voice, "the constraints benefited the production, freeing the actors for more "conceptual interpretations of the action." Bruce Weber of The New York Times was critical of the staging in the third and titular act, describing it as aggressive "with a tone that suggests directorial interpretation". Yet Weber still found the play as a whole "rather fascinating" as an experiment. Everything That Rises Must Converge was shown again at the Cathedral of St. John the Divine in Manhattan in 2015.

Coonrod directed Julius Caesar which opened in January 2003 at the Lucille Lortel Theatre and was presented by the TFANA. She adapts the play for modern viewers and alludes to present day politics by costuming the actors in Western-style business suit and tie. According to Weber, "Coonrod has encouraged a weaselly aspect from the performers… making the usurping senators seem like gossip mongers in the halls of Enron or lackeys in a Karl Rove strategy session" with "a conspiracy more venal than noble. And it works very well at first." Weber notes, as the play approaches the assassination in the finale, it "very quickly descends into bombastic melodrama."

Coonrod directed her third play for the Theater for a New Audience when she staged a production of Coriolanus by Shakespeare at the Gerald W. Lynch Theater at John Jay College in 2005. The play was given a stripped-down industrial-chic motif on an almost bare stage. The New York Times' Charles Isherwood was critical of the play's lack of vivid presentation which he asserted Coriolanus needs "to come fully to life". John Heilpern's review for The New York Observer was more receptive, crediting Coonrod for "refusing to talk down to Shakespeare (and therefore to audiences)." Heilpern noted:

The new production doesn't dress up Coriolanus with trumpets and drums. The blood of battle is imagined. (And banners are easy.) It dares to mirror Shakespeare's intention in a near-empty space—and let the austere play speak for itself.

=== Compagnia de' Colombari ===
For 2010's More Or Less I Am, Coonrod drew inspiration from Walt Whitman's 1855 poem "Song of Myself". The play was performed publicly at several locations in New York including Grant's Tomb and Joe's Pub at The Public Theatre. The production is a mixture of "dance, music, and spoken word." Earlier that year, Coonrod had directed the Romanian poet András Visky's play I Killed My Mother at Theater Y in Chicago. The play was produced again at La MaMa Experimental Theatre Club in New York in 2012. Coonrod returned to The Public Theater in 2011 to direct another of Shakespeare's earlier plays, Love's Labour's Lost. Trimming down some of the "obsolete wordplay about Latin declensions", Coonrod's adaptation of the play—about four men attempting to remain celibate to focus on academic pursuits—cuts out several of the subplots and relies more on slapstick humor.

In 2014, Coonrod directed one of Shakespeare's later plays, Tempest, staged at the La MaMa. The audience for this production were arranged in seats on three sides of the unadorned stage designed by Riccardo Hernandez but with "a layered soundscape of whistles, echoes, coos, breaths" coming from all around them and Christopher Akerlind's ominous lighting production. The first of three productions of the play at La MaMa that year, the play was two hours long with no intermissions. The New York Times described it as "a beautiful production" even though it takes "time to find a momentum it can sustain. It's not until the appearance of Stephano that things get going." Coonrod's other 2014 production, Orfeo in Orvieto, based on Claudio Monteverdi's L'Orfeo, was staged in the historic courtyard of the Palazzo Simoncelli in Orvieto. The opera included American and Italian performers from the Umbrian city.

In texts&beheadings/ElizabethR (2015), Coonrod "deconstructs to reconstruct" the public image and cultural depictions of Queen Elizabeth I. The script compiled by Coonrod consists of the queen's own words written "in personal and public letters, prayers and state speeches." The play is divided into four elements: Strategy, Survival, Prayers, and Sovereignty; each representing a force of influence on the queen's life and represented by a different actress inhabiting the central role of the protagonist. Coonrod produced the play with Compagnia de' Colombari and staged it, in 2015, at the Brooklyn Academy of Music, the Folger Theatre in Washington, D.C., and the Wesleyan University Center for the Arts.

After the performance of Coonrod's The Merchant in Venice (2016) in the play's titular city, a mock trial was staged with several judges, including Supreme Court Justice Ruth Bader Ginsburg. The panel heard appeals on the court case central to the plot. In 2017, The Merchant of Venice, under its original title and again with Coonrod's direction, was staged at Montclair State University's Alexander Kasser Theater. In her adaptations of this Shakespearean play, Coonrod chose to split the role of Shylock among five actors, male and female. The New York Times described the director's use of fragmentation to unravel the mystery of the controversial character as "surprisingly effective."

For the Theatre at St. Clement in New York in 2018, Coonrod directed Babette's Feast from a play by Rose Courtney based on the 1950 short story Anecdotes of Destiny written by Isak Dinesen and published in Ladies' Home Journal. According to The New York Times, the production shows how Coonrod is not particularly interested in realism. Unlike the 1987 Danish feature film Babette's Feast, the director forgoes the culinary elements of the play and lets the audience imagine the preparation for the banquet.

== Personal life ==
Coonrod is married to Jonathan Geballe.
