= Farkas Street Theatre =

Coordinates: 46.76768972°N 23.59253479°E

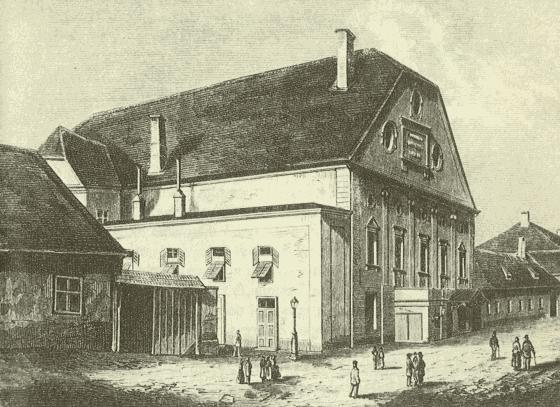
First Hungarian Theatre in Kolozsvár

Farkas Street Theatre was a theatre in Kolozsvár in Hungary (now Cluj-Napoca, Romania), founded in 1821 and closed in 1906. It is known as the first permanent theatre building in Hungary, and played a pioneering role in the development of the professional theatre in Hungary. It also played a pioneering role in Hungarian Opera, and was an opera house in 1887–1896. It was the first of three theatres built in Hungary before the National Theatre (Budapest) in 1837. While the first Hungarian language professional theatre had been founded in 1789, Hungarian theatre consisted of travelling theatre companies until the foundation of the Farkas Street Theatre in 1821.
