= Asterios Karagiannis =

German footballer

Personal information
- Full name: Asterios Karagiannis
- Date of birth: 28 July 1986 (age 40)
- Place of birth: Dortmund, West Germany
- Height: 1.92 m (6 ft 4 in)
- Position: Goalkeeper

Team information
- Current team: Sportfreunde Baumberg

Youth career
- 1997–1999: Borussia Dortmund
- 1999–2002: Schalke 04
- 2002–2005: VfL Bochum

Senior career*
| Years | Team | Apps | (Gls) |
| 2005–2007 | SF Oestrich Iserlohn | 3 | (0) |
| 2007–2008 | SSV Hagen | 14 | (0) |
| 2008 | Hasper SV | 8 | (0) |
| 2008–2010 | Wuppertaler SV II | 19 | (0) |
| 2009–2010 | Wuppertaler SV | 1 | (0) |
| 2010–2011 | KFC Uerdingen 05 | 23 | (0) |
| 2011–2012 | 1. FC Magdeburg | 0 | (0) |
| 2012–2013 | Hellas Makedonikos Hagen | - | (-) |
| 2013–2014 | FC Monheim | - | (-) |
| 2014–2015 | VfB Hilden | 23 | (0) |
| 2015–2017 | Sportfreunde Baumberg | 36 | (0) |
| 2017 | TuS Meerbusch | 0 | (0) |
| 2017–2019 | FSV Vohwinkel | 65 | (0) |
| 2019–2020 | Union Velbert | - | (-) |
| 2020-2021 | VfB Schwelm | - | (-) |
| 2021– | DV Solingen | 21 | (0) |
- * Club domestic league appearances and goals

Asterios Karagiannis (Greek: Αστέριος Καραγιάννης; born 28 July 1986 in Dortmund) is a Greek footballer, who plays for Sportfreunde Baumberg.

== Club career ==
Karagiannis played in the youth side for Borussia Dortmund, Schalke 04 and VfL Bochum.

After spending several years in VfL Bochum's reserve team, Karagiannis was signed in July 2005 by SF Oestrich Iserlohn, where he played three games in the 2006–07 season. He left after two years and on 27 July 2007, he signed with Landesliga Westfalen club SSV Hagen. He spent only a half-year, before joining Hasper SV in January 2008. Karagiannis played with his team Hasper SV the 2007–08 season to end and signed in July 2008 for Wuppertaler SV. He played in his first season with Wuppertaler SV's reserve team and made his senior debut on 28 November 2009 in a 3. Liga match against Carl Zeiss Jena as a substitute for Christoph Maly, after being sent off.
