= Union of the Theatres of Europe =

Alliance of European Theatres

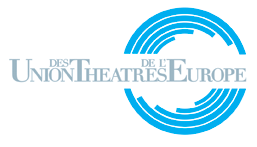

The Union of European Theatres (UTE; French: Union des Théâtres de l'Europe) is an alliance of European public theatres. It promotes European integration through cultural interaction.

It does transnational theatre work comprising over ten thousand performances and reaching three million viewers each season.

== History ==
The UTE was founded in 1990 by Jack Lang, then Culture Minister of France, and Italian theatre director Giorgio Strehler. Apart from fostering European integration, their motivation also was the perceived threat to European cultural diversity posed by globalisation:

"Already then we felt that the building of Europe required a firm stand against the unruly vagaries of the economic machine. Today we find ourselves faced with the same questions: how do we defend art within a market economy whose logistics are designed to standardise our way of life and thought so that we are reduced to a state of passive consumerism? Can public policies that support the arts be more effective?"

== Mission ==
The UTE's stated mission is

"to contribute to the building of the European Union through culture and theatre, to encourage a collective cultural movement that breaks through language barriers in order to develop an art theatre which is seen as a vector of fraternity among people. The UTE promotes productions and co-productions, theatre exchanges and shared experiences while respecting individual identities and cultures. ... Etched in continuity, the sum of these activities helps in elucidating the objectives of artistic and cultural policies that aim to reinforce artistic cooperation and transnational circulation in Europe."

The UTE is a “multinational house”, an idea which corresponds to the so-called “Mehrspartenhaus” in German Theatre – that is, one major theatre with different departments, and in the case of the UTE one theatre that consists of seventeen national theatres but yet remains a single entity. This “multinational house” intensively discusses the questions of a European identity and the role of culture in its formation. Its goal is to promote cultural activities across national borders that respect the principles of the particular identities, a thing that requires common and continuous research. Its current programme focuses on projects that put new working methods to the test and connects experienced theatre creators with enthusiastic newcomers, projects which are close to the citizens of the different European cities, and all this on a long-term scale.

== Members and structure ==
The UTE is governed by a General Assembly and a board of directors.

The president is Gábor Tompa, artistic and general director of the Hungarian Theatre of Cluj, Romania.

Today the UTE has 19 member theatres in 15 European countries and beyond:

- since 1990: Piccolo Teatro - Teatro d'Europa, Milan, Italy
- since 1991: Teatrul Bulandra, Bucharest, Romania
- since 1994: Teatro di Roma, Rome, Italy
- since 1996: National Theatre of Northern Greece (ΚΘΒΕ), Thessaloniki, Greece
- since 1998: Maly Drama Theatre, Saint Petersburg, Russia
- since 2003: Teatro Nacional São João, Porto, Portugal
- since 2006: National Theatre of Israel, Habimah, Tel Aviv, Israel
- since 2006: Yugoslav Drama Theatre, Belgrade, Serbia
- since 2008: Schauspielhaus Graz, Graz, Austria
- since 2008: Cluj-Napoca Hungarian Theatre, Cluj-Napoca, Romania
- since 2009: National Theatre (Prague), Prague, Czech Republic
- since 2009: National Theatre of Greece, Athens, Greece
- since 2010: Maly Theatre (Moscow), Moscow, Russia
- since 2011: SFUMATO, Sofia, Bulgaria
- since 2013: Schauspiel Stuttgart, Germany
- since 2013: Schauspielhaus Bochum, Germany
- since 2013: Comédie de Reims, Reims, France
- since 2013: Théâtre National du Luxembourg, Luxemburg
- since 2015: Vígszínház, Budapest, Hungary
- since 2015: Volkstheater Wien, Vienna, Austria
- since 2017: Schauspiel Köln, Cologne, Germany
- since 2017: Stanislavsky Electrotheatre, Moscow, Russia

Individual members:

- Csaba Antal
- Victor Arditti
- Silviu Purcarete
- Tadeusz Bradecki
- Giorgio Ursini Uršič

Honorary members:

- Lev Dodin, President of honor
- Georges Banu
- Tamás Ascher
- Patrice Chéreau (1944 Lézigné – 2013 Clichy)
- Jack Lang
- Krystian Lupa
- Robert Sturua
- Anatoly Vassiliev
- Andrzej Wajda

The operations of the UTE are supported by the "Creative Europe" Programme of the European Union.

The UTE is headquartered in Bobigny, France.

== Activities ==
The UTE presents theatre festivals, exhibitions, workshops, theatre school collaborations. artist exchanges, publications, conferences, colloquiums, theatre co-productions and translation initiatives throughout Europe. The Union des Théâtres de l'Europe has over 40 members, 20 of which are major national and municipal theatres from 17 countries.
