= National Theatre of Northern Greece =

Institution promoting performing arts

Coordinates: 40.6266°N 22.9496°E

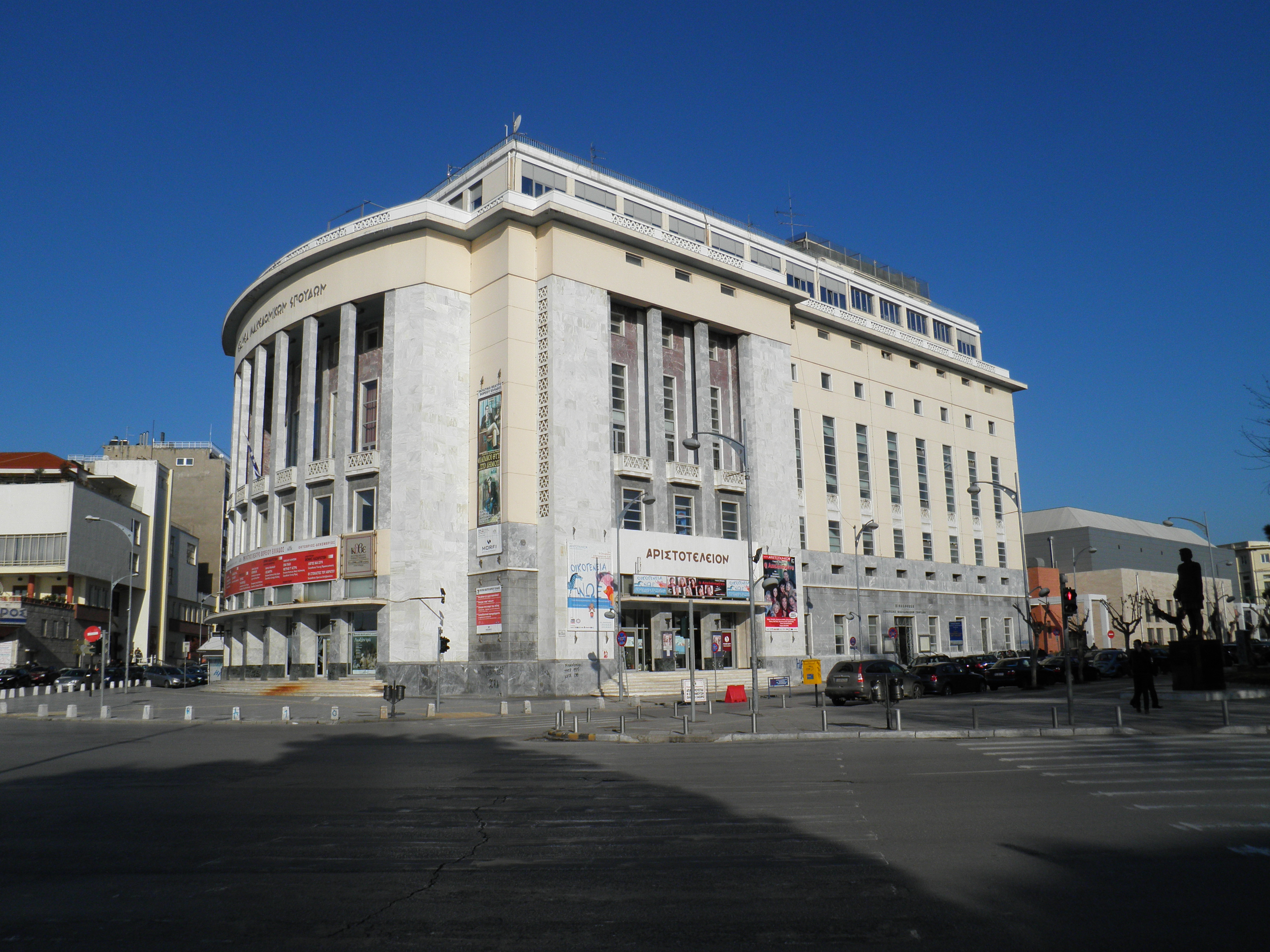
- The building of the Society of Macedonian studies, seat of the National Theatre of Northern Greece.
- Formation: 1961
- Headquarters: Thessaloniki, Greece
- Artistic Director: Asterios Peltekis
- President: Yiannoula Karibali-Tsiptsiou
- Website: https://www.ntng.gr/

The National Theatre of Northern Greece or NTNG (Greek: Κρατικό Θέατρο Βορείου Ελλάδος, ΚΘΒΕ) is an institution promoting performing arts primarily in Thessaloniki and Northern Greece, founded in 1961.

The complex of the Society of Macedonian Studies houses its headquarters, consisted of three buildings. Asterios Peltekis serves as theatre's current Artistic director.

== History ==
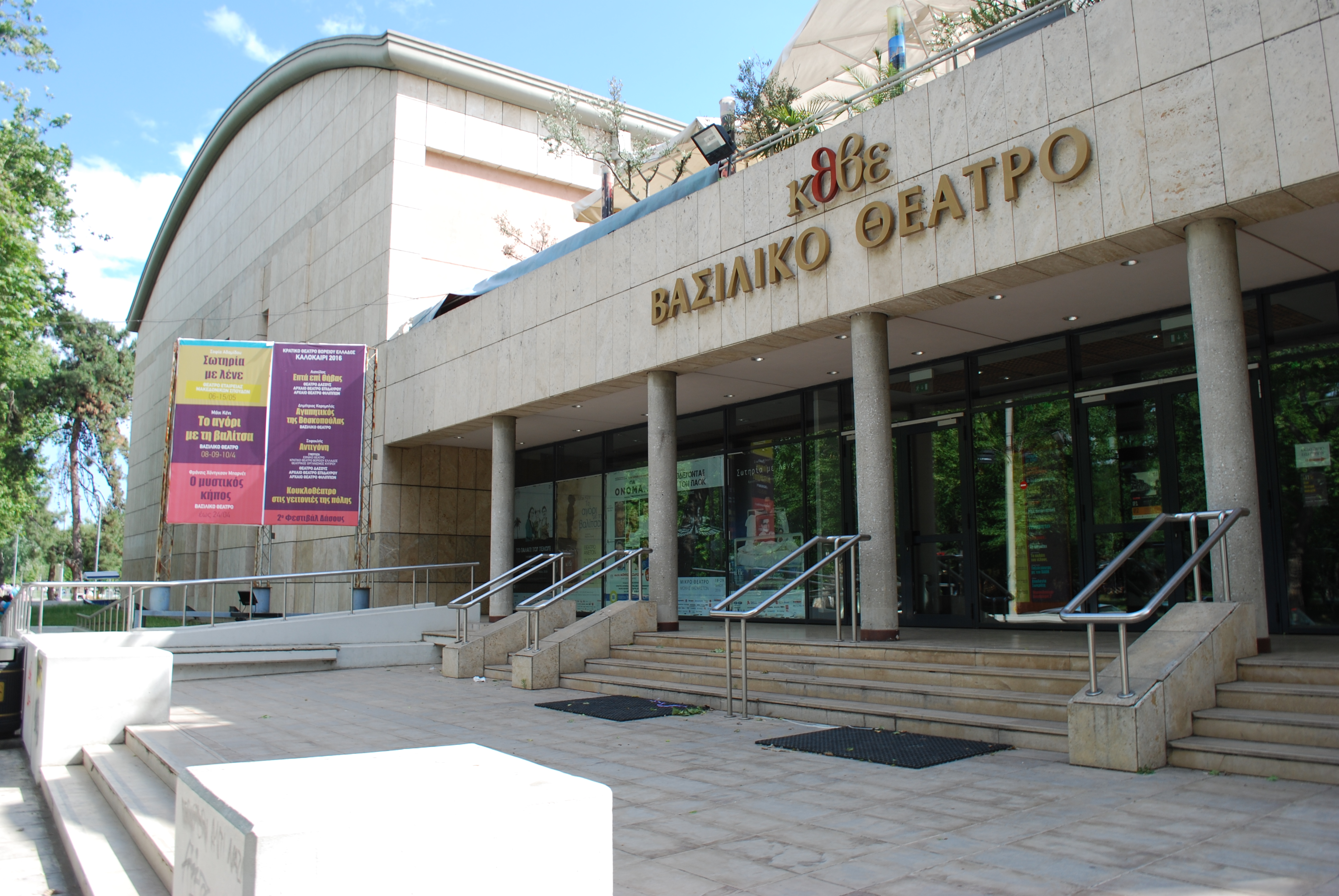
The building of the Royal Theatre (Vasiliko Theatro)

NTNG was founded in 1961.The same year Sokratis Karantinos was appointed its first director and Yiorgos Theotokas its first president. Royal Theatre was the initial base of the institution but shortly after NTNG moved its headquarters to the complex of the Society of Macedonian Studies. Megaron B', which hosts the theatre, was designed in early 1951 by Vasilis Kassandras, influenced by the Théâtre des Champs-Élysées. Institution's first ever performance was Sophocles' Oedipus Rex at the Ancient Theatre of Philippi. In 1973 the Drama School of the National Theatre of Northern Greece was established. Moreover institution's Dance Theatre was founded in 1982, a part which is now inactive.

NTNG's present institutional framework was established in 1994, with an Artistic Director and a seven-member Board of Directors who run the Theatre, which is subsidized by the Ministry of Culture and Tourism (Greece). With four indoor theatres and two open-air theatres, NTNG is one of the biggest theatre organizations in Greece and Europe.

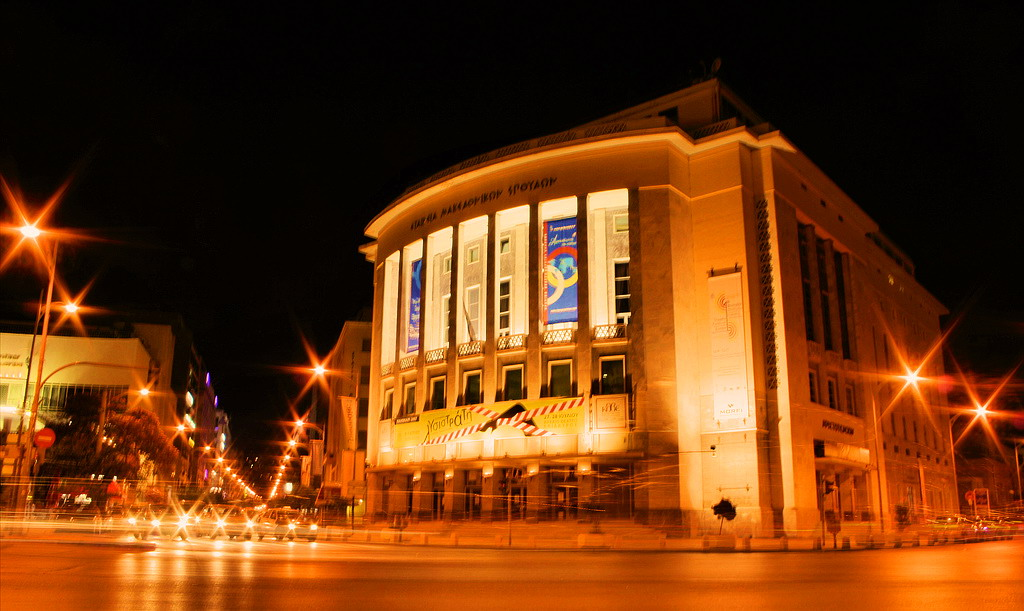
The HQ building at night

Since May 1996, NTNG has been a member of the Union of the Theatres of Europe. In October 1997, the 6th Festival of the Union of the Theatres of Europe took place in Thessaloniki, and was a great cultural event for Thessaloniki as well as for Greece. The institution hosted the events of the 11th and 12th Europe Theatre Prize in 2007 and 2008 respectively. NTNG is also a member of the International Theatre Institute.

== Activities ==
Its activity is not limited to theatrical productions but extends to cultural sectors such as education, literature and the arts through the organization of exhibitions, conferences, festivals, theatre-educational programmes and so forth. NTNG’s annual artistic programme combines in-house productions, co-productions with other theatres, tributes and exchanges with other theatre organizations, as well as guest performances from Greece and abroad.
