= Asterion (sculptor) =

Ancient Greek sculptor

Asterion (Ancient Greek: Ἀστερίων), son of Aeschylus, was a sculptor of ancient Greece. His time is uncertain, and we know only that he lived in or before the 2nd century BCE. The geographer Pausanias mentions a statue of his depicting a boy named "Chaereas son of Chaeremon", a young Sicyonian pugilist, which was of his workmanship.
