= Asterios Ikonomikos =

Greek footballer

Stergios Ikonomikos
Personal information
- Full name: Asterios Ikonomikos
- Date of birth: 25 February 2000 (age 26)
- Place of birth: Greece
- Height: 1.80 m (5 ft 11 in)
- Position: Midfielder

Youth career
- 2014–2018: Olympiacos
- 2018: AKA Vorarlberg
- 2018–2019: Olympia Radotín
- 2019–2020: Lamia

Senior career*
Years	Team	Apps	(Gls)
2018	SC Rheindorf Altach II	2	(0)
2018–2019	Olympia Radotín	17	(1)
2019–2020	Lamia	0	(0)
2020	Niki Volos	3	(0)
2021	Dinamo Vranje	12	(1)
2022	Zlatibor Čajetina	12	(1)
2022–2023	Diagoras	6	(0)
2023–2024	Fostiras		
2024	Ermionida		
- * Club domestic league appearances and goals as of 22 December 2022

Asterios "Stergios" Ikonomikos (Greek: Αστέριος 'Στέργιος' Οικονομίκος; born 25 February 2000) is a Greek professional footballer who plays as a midfielder.
