= Asterio Mañanós Martínez =

Spanish painter

- Born: Asterio Mañanós Martínez; 21 October 1861; Palencia, Spain
- Died: c.1935-1939 Madrid, Spain

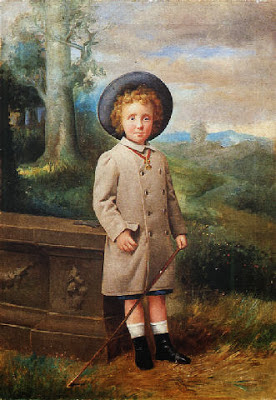
Portrait of King Alfonso XIII as a Child (before 1900)

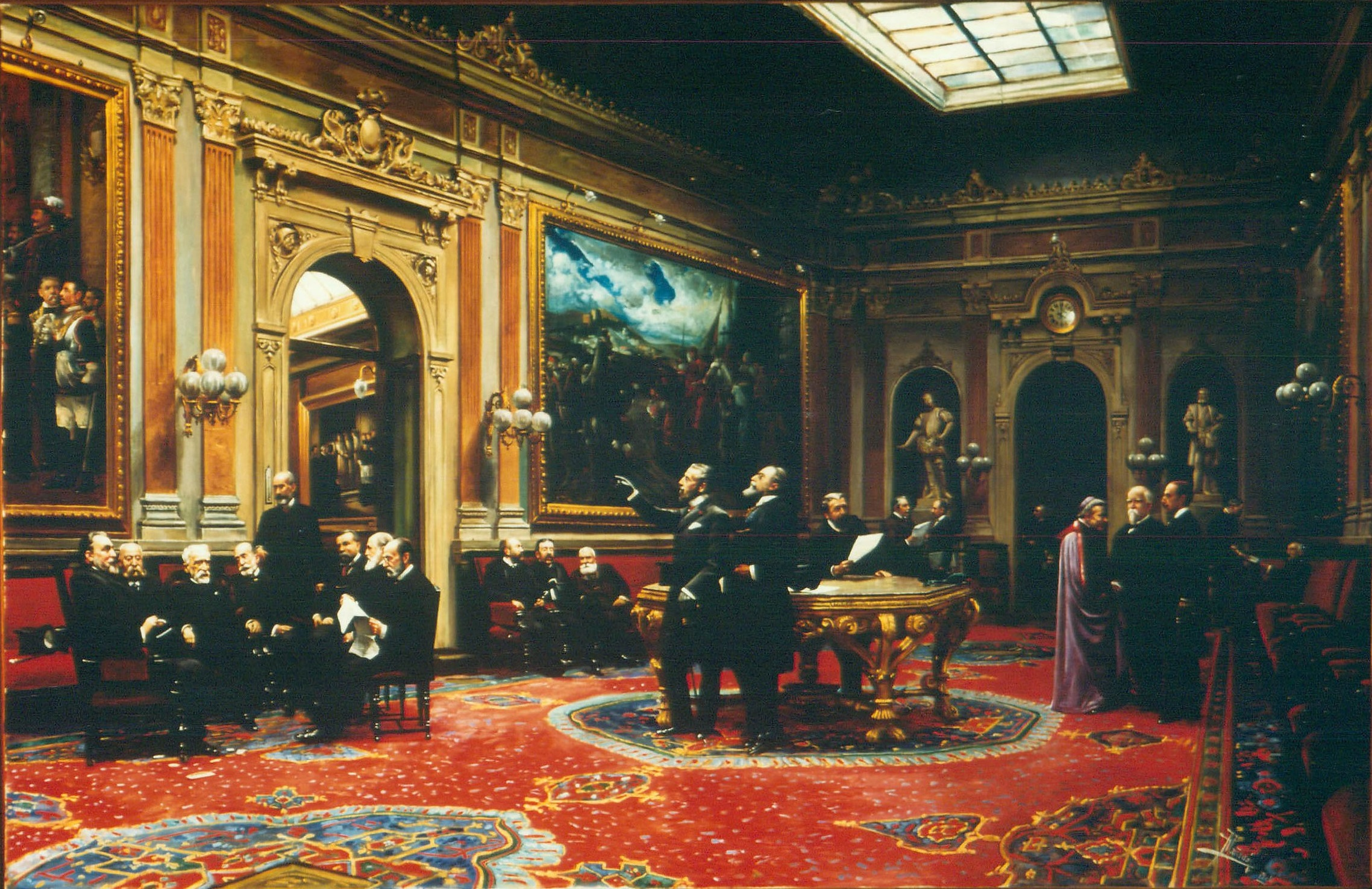
Conference Hall of the Senate, in March 1904, the first of a series of six paintings on Spanish politics.

Asterio Mañanós Martínez (21 October 1861 – c. 1935) was a Spanish painter who specialized in portraits and Costumbrista. He was also the curator for the historical artworks preserved in the Spanish Senate.

== Biography ==
He was born in Palencia, where he began his studies at the Escuela Municipal de Dibujo de Palencia. In 1877, he continued at the Escuela de Bellas Artes de San Fernando in Madrid, where he studied with Casto Plasencia and José Casado del Alisal. He also made frequent visits to the Museo del Prado and made copies of Diego Velázquez. In 1881, he had his first showing at the National Exhibition of Fine Arts. He then divided his time between Madrid and Palencia, where he painted the curtains and backdrops for the "Teatro de Recreo Palentino".

In 1885, he received a fellowship from the Provincial government of Palencia to further his education at the Spanish Academy in Rome for a period of one year. Upon his return, he and another local artist were commissioned to decorate the "Teatro de la Peña Palentina". Also, he entered into a partnership to open a school of drawing named after his former teacher, Casado del Alisal. Despite this new commitment, he moved to Paris in 1889 to study Realism with Léon Bonnat. He stayed for a year, then returned to Spain and set up a studio in Madrid.

In 1908, following some restorations he had done for the Spanish Senate, a committee named him the curator of its art collection. He created some of his best-known works as a result of this relationship: large canvases portraying the Senate in session. One of his final paintings was an allegory on the Second Republic. He was last heard from in 1935. The exact date, whereabouts and circumstances of his death are unknown. Speculation has centered on events related to the Spanish Civil War.
