= Gábor Tompa =

Hungarian director, poet, essayist and teacher

A photo of Gábor Tompa

Gábor Tompa (born 8 August 1957 in Târgu Mureș) is an internationally renowned Romanian theater and film director, poet, essayist and teacher. Between 2007 and 2016 he was the Head of Directing at the Theatre and Dance Department of the University of California, San Diego. He is the general and artistic director of the Hungarian Theatre of Cluj since 1990, the theatre is member of the Union of the Theatres of Europe (UTE) since 2008. Founder and artistic director of the Interferences International Theatre Festival in Cluj, Romania. President of the Union of the Theatres of Europe since 2018.

== Professional career ==
He graduated in stage and film directing at the I.L. Caragiale Theatre and Film Academy in Bucharest in 1981 as a student of Liviu Ciulei, Mihai Dimiu, Cătălina Buzoianu, founders of the world-famous Romanian school of stage directing. Since 1981 Tompa has directed plays at the Cluj-Napoca Hungarian Theatre in Cluj-Napoca. In 1987 he became the artistic director of the theatre, after the Romanian Revolution of 1989 he became the managing director of the theatre as well. He has staged more than 80 plays and produced other 80 in the United Kingdom, France, Germany, Spain, Austria, Serbia, Czech Republic, Canada, South Korea and the U.S. in addition to Romania and Hungary - in English, French, German, Romanian, Hungarian, Catalan and other languages. His feature film, Chinese Defense (1999), a Hungarian-Romanian-French coproduction has been presented at the Festivals of Berlin, Karlovy Vary, São Paulo, Trieste, Istanbul, Budapest, Soci and has been awarded the Best First Feature in Salerno, Italy.

Since 1989 he has been professor at the Szentgyörgyi István Theatre Academy in Târgu Mureş. He founded the Faculty of Dramatic Art in Cluj and has run its directing programme since 1991. From 1990 to 1995 he was head of directing at the Theatre Academy in Târgu Mureş; in 1991 he founded the Theatre and Drama Faculty in Cluj-Napoca. In 2005 he directed the M.A. program at Brunel University, London, UK. He has taught classes and workshops for actors and directors in Spain, the UK, Germany, Hungary, France and South Korea. From 2007 to 2015 he served as Head of Directing at the Theatre and Dance Department of the University of California, San Diego, where he keeps teaching Theatre Directing and History of Directing.

From March 2006 to April 2008 (when the Hungarian Theatre of Cluj joined the UTE), he was an individual member of the Union of the Theatres of Europe. Founder in 2007 and artistic director to the present of the biennial Interferences International Theatre Festival in Cluj. In 2018 he has been elected President of the European Theatre Union (UTE).

== Children ==
Eszter Tompa (1984), Ábel Tompa (1998), Sára Tompa (2002)

== Works worldwide ==
- Ionesco: The Chairs - Theatre National de Luxembourg (LUXEMBOURG, 2022)
- Beckett: Waiting for Godot - Teatro Nacional Sao Joao, Porto (PORTUGAL,2021)
- Shakespeare: Richard II - Vígszínház, Pesti Színház (Budapest, HUNGARY, 2019)
- Dmitri Shostakovitch: Lady Macbeth of the Mtsensk District - Slovene National Opera (Maribor, SLOVENIA, 2017)
- Saviana Stanescu: Toys - Hudson Theatre, Los Angeles (USA, 2015)
- Chekhov: Cherry Orchard - SNG Maribor, Slovenian National Theatre (SLOVENIA, 2015)
- Büchner: Danton's Death (adapted by András Visky) - Seoul Arts Center (Seoul, SOUTH KOREA, 2013)
- Pirandello: Tonight We Improvise - La Jolla Playhouse-UCSD- Potiker Theatre (San Diego, USA, 2013)
- Ionesco: Rhinoceros - National Theatre of Prague (CZECH REPUBLIC, 2012)
- Henry Purcell: Dido and Aeneas - Bach Collegium (San Diego, USA, 2011)
- Ruins True – Coproduced by the Sushi Center for the Urban Arts, San Diego, USA and the Hungarian Theatre of Cluj (2010)
- Büchner: Woyzeck - La Jolla Playhouse-Potiker Theatre (San Diego, USA, 2009)
- Mrozek: Tango - Theatre & Dance Department of the University of California (San Diego, USA, 2008)
- After Euripides: Medea Circles – Municipal Theatre (Novi Sad, SERBIA, 2005)
- Ionesco: The New Tenant – Northern Stage Ensemble (Newcastle, ENGLAND, 2004)
- Beckett: Play – Hungarian Theatre of Cluj, Theatre Thália (Budapest, HUNGARY, 2003)
- Beckett: Waiting for Godot – Vígszínház (Budapest, HUNGARY, 2003)
- L. Pirandello: Tonight We Improvise – Staatsteather Freiburg (GERMANY, 2003)
- András Visky: Juliet – Theatre Thália, Budapest – Hungarian Theatre of Cluj (2002)
- A. Camus: The Misunderstanding – Vígszínház (Budapest, HUNGARY, 2002)
- A. P. Chekhov: Three Sisters – Staatstheater Freiburg (GERMANY, 2002)
- W. Shakespeare: King Lear – Vígszínház (Budapest, HUNGARY, 2001)
- Beckett: Waiting for Godot – Manitoba Theatre Centre (Winnipeg, CANADA, 2001)
- Ionesco: The Bald Prima Donna – Athéneé Théâtre Louis Jouvet (Paris, FRANCE, 2000)
- Molière: Tartuffe – Théâtre de l`Union (Limoges, FRANCE, 2000)
- Beckett: Endgame – Teatre Principal de Palma (SPAIN, 2000)
- Beckett: Waiting for Godot – Lyric Theatre Belfast (UK, 1999)
- Mrozek: Tango – Teatre Lliure (Barcelona, SPAIN, 1999)
- Molière: The Pretentious Ladies – Teatre Alegria (Barcelona, SPAIN, 1999)
- Mrozek: Tango – Pesti Színház (Budapest, HUNGARY, 1997)
- Camus: The Misunderstanding – Akademietheater (Wien, AUSTRIA, 1997)
- Ionesco: The Bald Prima Donna – Théâtre de l`Union (Limoges, FRANCE, 1996)
- Visniec: Old Clown Wanted – Auersperg Fünftzen Theatre (Wien, AUSTRIA, 1996)
- Molière: Tartuffe – Thália Theatre (Budapest, HUNGARY, 1996)
- Beckett: Waiting for Godot – Staatstheater, Freiburg, Kammerspiele (GERMANY, 1995)
- Shakespeare: Hamlet – Tramway Theatre (Glasgow, UK, 1994)
- Beckett: Endgame – Wilma Theatre (Philadelphia, USA, 1992 - workshop)
- Beckett: Waiting for Godot – Szigligeti Theatre Szolnok (HUNGARY, 1992)
- Camus: The Misunderstanding – Szigligeti Theatre Szolnok (HUNGARY, 1991)
- Székely: The Moors – CastleTheatre Gyula (HUNGARY, 1991)
- Büchner: Woyzeck – Municipal Theatre (Novi Sad, YUGOSLAVIA, 1990)
- Enquist: Song for Phaedra – National Theatre Skopje (YUGOSLAVIA, 1987)

== Works in Romania ==
- Aischylos - Kali - Tompa : Prometheus'22 an UTE Project - Hungarian Theatre of Cluj, National Drama Theatre Ljubljana, State Theatre Constantza (2022)
- Shakespeare: Hamlet - Hungarian Theatre of Cluj (2021)
- Mozart: The Magic Flute - Hungarian State Opera of Cluj (2020)
- E. Ionesco: Rhinoceros - National Theatre of Timisoara (2020)
- W. Shakespeare: The Tempest - Lucian Blaga National Theatre of Cluj (2019)
- Marin Sorescu: Jonas - Nottara Theatre, Bucharest (2019)
- Maurice Ravel: L'heure espagnole/ L'enfant et les sortiléges/ two operas in one act - Hungarian Opera of Cluj (2018)
- W. Shakespeare: The Merchant of Venice - Hungarian Theatre of Cluj (2018)
- Max Frisch: Biedermann und die Brandstifter - Deutsches Theater Temeschwaar (2016)
- S. Beckett: Endgame - National Theatre of Tg. Mures, Tompa Miklós Company (2016)
- A. Jarry/G. Tompa: UbuZdup! - adapted from Ubu Enchained and Ubu Cockhold - Lucian Blaga National Theatre of Cluj (2015)
- F. Dürrenmatt: The Visit - Hungarian Theatre of Cluj (2015)
- E. Ionesco: The New Tenant - Nottara Theatre, Bucharest (2014)
- Manea: The Manea Trilogy (Penelope Remains Thoughtful - The rehearsal - The Eastern Fairy) - Lucian Blaga National Theatre of Cluj (2013)
- Tompa - Visky: Leonida Gem Session (freefall adaptation after Caragiale) - Hungarian Theatre of Cluj (2012)
- Snaith, Clancy, Reich, Tompa, Yadegari: Ruins True Refuge - Hungarian Theatre of Cluj (2012)
- Molière: The Misanthrope - National Theatre of Iaşi (2011)
- Georg Büchner: Leonce and Lena – Hungarian Theatre of Cluj (2010)
- W. A. Mozart: Don Giovanni – National Opera of Cluj (2010)
- András Visky: Alcoholics – Hungarian Theatre of Cluj (2010)
- András Visky: Born for Never – Hungarian Theatre of Cluj (2009)
- E. Ionesco - The Bald Prima Donna – Lucian Blaga National Theater (Cluj, 2009)
- A. P. Chekhov: Three Sisters – Hungarian Theatre of Cluj (2008)
- W. Shakespeare - Richard III – Hungarian Theatre of Cluj - Gyula Castle Theatre, Hungary (2008)
- András Visky: Long Friday– Hungarian Theatre of Cluj (2006)
- Heiner Müller: Quartet – SalTimBanc Foundation Timişoara, Hungarian Theatre of Cluj, Nottara Theatre, Bucharest, Metropolis Youth Theatre (Bucharest, 2006)
- Shakespeare: King Lear – Lucian Blaga National Theatre (Cluj, 2006)
- E. Ionesco: Rhinoceros – Radu Stanca Theatre (Sibiu, 2006)
- I.L. Caragiale: The Lost Letter – Hungarian Theatre of Cluj (2005)
- András Visky: Disciples – Hungarian Theatre of Cluj (2005)
- Beckett: Waiting for Godot – Tamási Áron Theatre, Sf. Gheorghe (2005)
- S. Mrozek: House on the Border – Radu Stanca Theatre (Sibiu, 2005)
- Alfred Jarry: Ubu Enchained – Comedy Theatre (Bucharest, 2004)
- S. Beckett: Happy Days – Comedy Theatre (Bucharest, 2004)
- E. Ionesco: Jacques or the Obedience – Hungarian Theatre of Cluj (2003, Nominated by UNITER for Best Performance of the Year)
- S. Beckett: Play – Theatre Thália, Budapest – Hungarian Theatre of Cluj (2003)
- S. Witkiewicz: Cockroaches – Radu Stanca Theatre (Sibiu, 2003)
- András Visky: Juliet – Theatre Thália, Budapest – Hungarian Theatre of Cluj (2002)
- S. Mrozek: Charlie – Hungarian Theatre of Cluj (2001)
- Molière: The Misanthrope – Hungarian Theatre of Cluj (2000, Nominated by UNITER for Best Performance of the Year 2001)
- S. Beckett: Endgame – Hungarian Theatre of Cluj (1999)
- Shakespeare: Troilus and Cresida – Hungarian Theatre of Cluj (1998)
- Shakespeare: Hamlet – National Theatre Craiova (1997)
- Gombrowicz: Operetta – Hungarian Theatre of Cluj (1997, Nominated by UNITER for Best Performance of the Year)
- Büchner: Woyzeck – Bulandra Theatre (Bucharest, 1995)
- Bulgakov: The Intrigue of the Hypocrites – Hungarian Theatre of Cluj (1995)
- Molière: Tartuffe – Theatre Academy (Tg-Mures, 1994)
- Camus: The Misunderstanding – Hungarian Theatre of Cluj (1993, Nominated by UNITER for Best Performance of the Year)
- Shakespeare: A Midsummer Night's Dream – Hungarian Theatre of Cluj (1992)
- Ionesco: The Bald Prima Donna – Hungarian Theatre of Cluj (1992)
- Shakespeare: As you like it – Hungarian Theatre of Cluj (1991)
- Székely: The Moors – Hungarian Theatre of Cluj (1991)
- Heltai: Moth-ball – Hungarian Theatre of Cluj (1990)
- Hsing-Chien: The Bus Stop – Hungarian Theatre of Cluj (1989)
- Sigmond: Raining with Love – Hungarian Theatre of Cluj (1989)
- Ispirescu: The Coach is Coming – National Theatre Tg-Mures (1989)
- Caragiale: A Tempestuous Night – Hungarian Theatre of Cluj (1988)
- Shakespeare: Hamlet – Hungarian Theatre of Cluj (1987)
- Sütő A.: Blithe Wailing – Hungarian Theatre of Cluj (1987)
- Poliakoff: City Sugar – Theatre Academy (Tg-Mures, 1986)
- Mrozek: Tango – Hungarian Theatre of Cluj (1985)
- Caragiale: A Tempestuous Night – National Theatre (Tg-Mures,1984)
- Feydeau: Cat in a Bag – Hungarian Theatre of Cluj (1984)
- Dehel G.: The Innocent – Hungarian Theatre of Cluj (1984)
- Bulgakov: Ivan, Wassilievitch – Bulandra Theatre (Bucharest, 1983)
- S. Mrozek: Piotr Ohey – Academy of Theatre from Tg. Mures (1983)
- Albee: The Zoo-Story – National Theatre (Tg-Mures, 1982)
- Bulgakov: Ivan, the Terrible – Hungarian Theatre of Cluj (1982)
- Blaga: Master Manole – Hungarian Theatre of Cluj (1982)
- Mrozek: Tango – Theatre Academy (Bucharest,1981)
- Büchner: Woyzeck – Hungarian Theatre (Sfîntu-Gheorghe,1980)
- Beckett: Happy Days – Theatre Academy (Bucharest, 1979)

== Movies ==
Shorts:

- Behind the Mask - director (Romanian Television) 1978
- Fugue - director (Romanian Television) 1979

Features:

- Chinese Defense – director (Hungarian-Romanian-French coproduction) 1999

== Published works ==
- Selected Poems (Székely Könyvtár, Csíkszereda, 2021)
- Van még könyvtár Amerikában? - Are there libraries left in America? (poems, Kalligram, Budapest, 2020)
- Gábor Tompa : The workpiece of a director- from the Three Sisters to the Cherry Orchard (performance photos, edited by Mirela Sandu, with a foreword by Georges Banu, Romanian Cultural Institute, Bucharest, 2016)
- Label-curtain - a private theatrical dictionary (English version, Bookart, 2014)
- Transylván pót-depressziók - Transylvanian back-up depressions (four-handed sonnets with András Ferenc Kovács, Bookart,2011)
- Címke-függöny – Label-curtain (Gábor Tompa's private theatre dictionary, Bookart, Csíkszereda, 2010)
- A tatu hozománya – The Armadillo's Dowry (poems for children, Pallas Akadémia, 2007)
- Lidércbánya – Mine of Nightmares (poems, Pallas Akadémia, 2004)
- Noé Színháza – Noah's Theatre (selected poems, Pallas Akadémia, 2004)
- Depressio Transilvaniae – (Four-handed sonnets with A. F. Kovács, Pallas Akadémia, Romania 1998)
- Aki nem én – Not I (poems, Târgu Mureş, Romania, 1996)
- A késdöfés gyöngédsége – The Tenderness of Stabbing (studies, Cluj-Napoca, Romania, 1995)
- Romániai magyar négykezesek – Four-handed Pieces (poems, with András Visky, Pécs, Hungary, 1994)
- Készenlét – Alertness (poems, Budapest, Hungary, 1990)
- Óra, árnyékok – Clock, Shadows (poems, Bucharest, Romania, 1989)
- A hűtlen színház – The Unfaithful Theatre (An essay on stage direction, Bucharest, 1987)

== Teaching experience ==
- Head of Directing at the Theatre Academy in Tg-Mures, Romania, 1990–1995
- Founder of the Theatre and Drama Faculty in Cluj, Romania, 1991
- Classes for actors at the State Theatre School in Freiburg, Germany, 1995–1999
- Theatre Academy, Barcelona and Institut del Teatre, Terrassa, Spain, 1999–2000
- Workshops for directors: International Workshop Festival, Manchester, UK 1993
- International Workshop Festival, Glasgow, UK 1994, International Workshop Festival, Belfast, UK 2000
- Festival de la Francophonie, Limoges, France 2003 Workshop on Shakespeare's Clowns, Palma de Mallorca, Spain 2003
- Brunel University, London, UK 2005 (directing MA programme)
- Festival Iberoamericano de Teatro, Bogota, Colombia (2012)'
- Workshop for young directors on Hamlet (National Theatre Company of Korea, Seoul, 2015)
- Workshop for young directors on Woyzeck (National Theatre Company of Korea, Seoul, 2016)

== Awards ==
- UNITER (Romanian Theater Union)

- Nominated for Best Performance Award, 2011 (Leonce and Lena)
- Nominated to the Best Performance Award, 2005 (Waiting for Godot)
- Nominated to the Best Performance Award, 2003 (Jacques or the Obedience)
- Winner of Award for Excellence – 2002
- Winner of Best Director of the Year in Romania (1984–ATM, 1987–ATM, 1993, 1997, 2008 and 2019)
- Winner of Best Performance of the Year in Romania (1989, 1992, 2008)

- Látó Poetry Award for 2020
- Pro Contemporary Hungarian Culture Award in Transylvania, 2019
- Hevesi Sándor Prize - ITI (International Theatre Institute) Award (2011)
- Ambassador of Hungarian Culture (Carnegie Hall, NY-2009)
- Media Excellency Prize (2008)
- International Festival of Short Plays (2013) - Best Directing
- The Festival of the Romanian Comedy (2007) – Best Directing
- Golden Apple Award (2007)
- The Festival of the Romanian Dramaturgy (2004) – Best Directing
- Szabadság Prize (2004)
- Artist Meritorious of Hungary (2002)
- The Distinction of the Romanian President (2000)
- Critics' Award (ITI Romania, 1997)
- “Interference”- Price of Romanian Culture Foundation (1997)
- Best Performance of the Year in Yugoslavia (1990)
- Best Foreign Performance of the Year in England (1993)
- ”I. L. Caragiale" National Theatre Festival – Best Directing (1992, 1996)
- Hungarian National Theatre Festival (1996) – Best Director
- International Theatre Festival - Chişinău (1994)

- Best Director
- Best Performance

- Theaterpreis, Stuttgart (1995)
- EMKE-Prise (1992)
- Kriterion-Prise (1997)
- “Cuvîntul“- Prise, (1996)
- Open Society Foundation Romania - Prize for Contemporary Arts theatre, 1998
- Nomination for The Irish Times Award - 1999 for Waiting for Godot
- Best First Feature Award, International Film Festival, Salerno, Italy, for Chinese Defence

== See also ==
- Cluj-Napoca Hungarian Theatre
- Union of the Theatres of Europe
