= Society for Macedonian Studies =

Scientific organization for the study of the history and culture of Macedonia

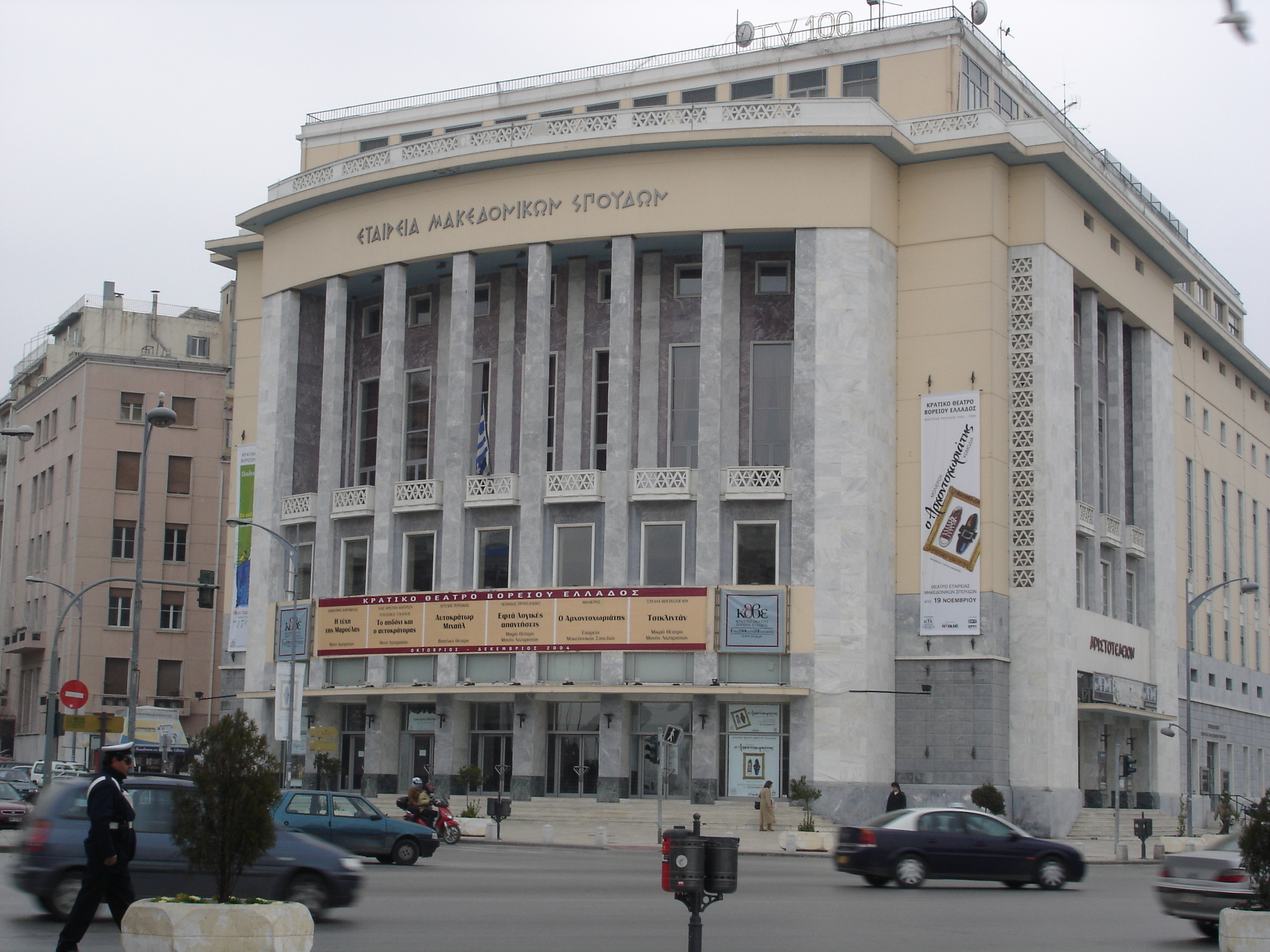

The Society for Macedonian Studies (Greek: Εταιρεία Μακεδονικών Σπουδών, romanized: Etaireia Makedonikon Spoudon) was founded on April 29, 1939, in Thessaloniki, Greece. The purpose of the Society is to foster research on the language, archaeology, history and folklore of Macedonia and to promote the cultivation of learning throughout the region. Its headquarters is also home to the Art Gallery of the Society for Macedonian Studies and to the National Theatre of Northern Greece.
