= Theatrical Organization of Cyprus =

The Theatre Organization of Cyprus or THOC (Greek: Θεατρικός Οργανισμός Κύπρου, ΘΟΚ), also known as Cyprus Theatre Organisation) is the first semi-governmental theatrical organization in Cyprus.

Established in 1970, THOC has a nine-member Board of Directors that appointed by the President of Cyprus for a three-year term of office. It is run by a Director appointed by the Board and ratified by the Council of Ministers. THOC has an Artistic Committee, an advisory body responsible for artistic matters.

Once the budget of THOC has been approved by the Ministry and the Council of Ministers, it is sent for approval by the House of Representatives. The Organisation's policy is set out by the Board.

== Stages ==
Until 1976, THOC organised its performances on two stages: the Main Stage and the Second Stage. Gradually, the requirement of a comprehensive repertoire, aimed at wide-ranging audiences of all ages, interests and preferences, made the creation of additional stages necessary

ΤHOC offers productions through its four stages:

- Main Stage: With large-scale productions of classical and modern plays, as well as ancient drama, intended for large audiences and with performances specially scheduled for secondary school students.
- New Stage: Established in 1994 as a follow-on from the Second Stage. Plays with small casts are performed in smaller spaces.
- Experimental Stage: Promoting new forms of theatre and research, the Experimental stage is a place for young artists and theatre people.
- Children's Stage: With plays by authors from Cyprus, Greece and other countries, THOC's Children's Stage reaches out to children of ages from 4–12, with performances specially organised for schools and nurseries.
