= Baranya County 2nd constituency =

Constituency in Hungary (2012-)

Coordinates: 46°04′15″N 18°13′59″E

Baranya County 2nd constituency (Pécs)
- Constituency for the National Assembly
- Location of Baranya county 02 within Baranya county

- Location of Baranya county within Hungary
- County: Baranya
- Electorate: 78,371 (2018)
- Major settlements: Pécs

Current constituency
- Created: 2011
- Party: Tisza Party
- Member: Áron Kovács
- Elected: 2026

The 2nd constituency of Baranya County (Hungarian: Baranya megyei 02. számú országgyűlési egyéni választókerület) is one of the single member constituencies of the National Assembly, the national legislature of Hungary. The constituency standard abbreviation: Baranya 02. OEVK.

Since 2026, it has been represented by Áron Kovács of the Tisza Party.

== Geography ==
The 2nd constituency is located in central part of Baranya County.

=== List of municipalities ===
The constituency includes the following municipalities:

1. Berkesd
2. Bogád
3. Cserkút
4. Ellend
5. Hásságy
6. Komló
7. Kozármisleny
8. Kővágószőlős
9. Lothárd
10. Magyarsarlós
11. Mánfa
12. Nagykozár
13. Orfű
14. Pereked
15. Pécs: Western and eastern suburban part of the city.
16. Romonya
17. Szemely
18. Szilágy

== Members ==
The constituency was first represented by Péter Hoppál of the Fidesz from 2014, and he was re-elected in 2018 and 2022. In the 2026 election, Áron Kovács of the Tisza Party was elected representative.

Election	Member	Party	%	Ref.
2014	Péter Hoppál	Fidesz	36.27	
2018	Péter Hoppál	Fidesz	40.11	
2022	Péter Hoppál	Fidesz	44.41	
2026	Áron Kovács	Tisza Party	61.23	
