= Nagykozár =

- Village
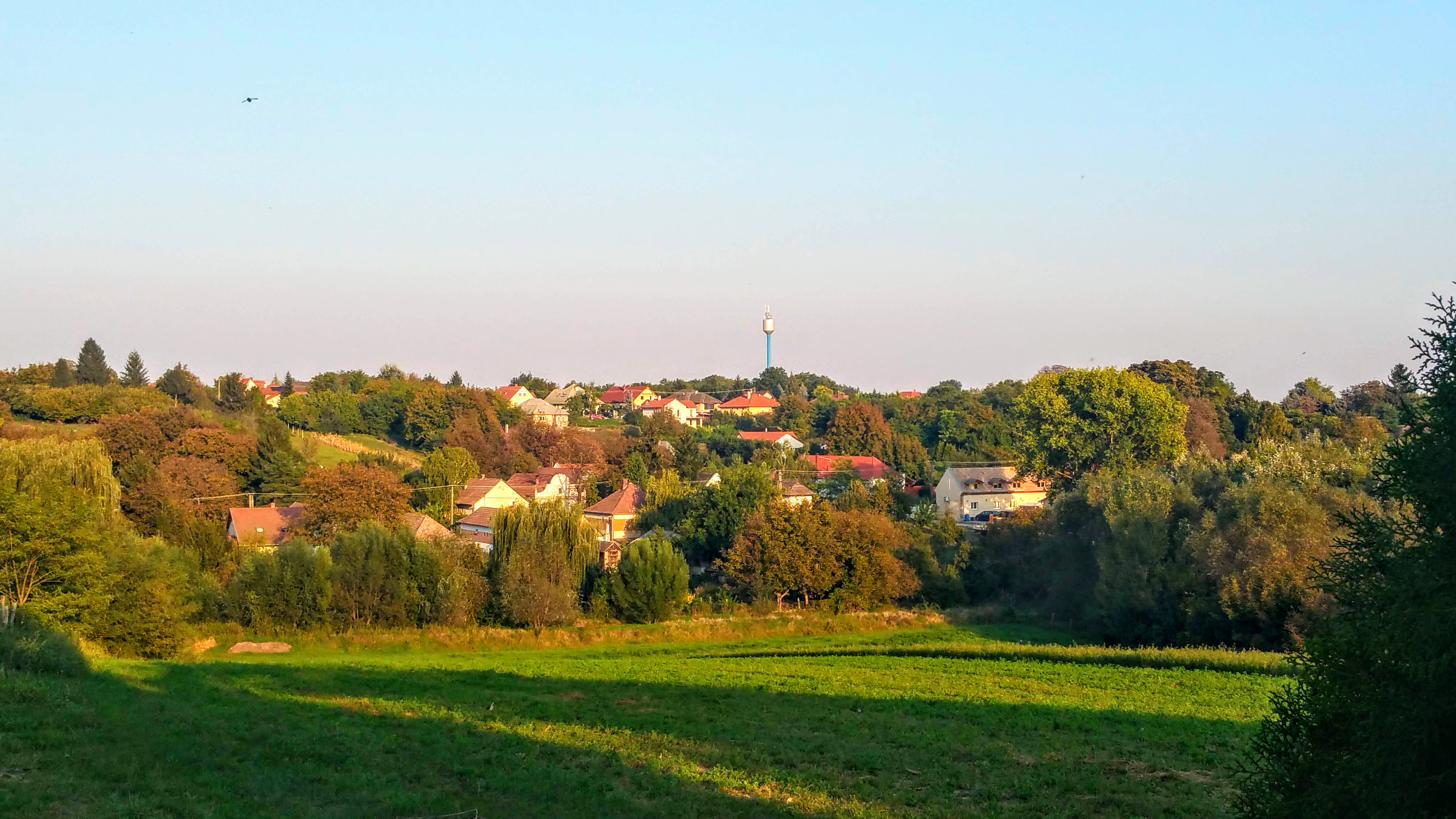
- Skyline in September 2018

- Flag Coat of arms
- Interactive map of Nagykozár
- Coordinates: 46°04′N 18°20′E
- Country: Hungary
- County: Baranya
- District: Pécs
- First attested: 1058
- Seal granted: 1796
- Named for: Khazars or Koazt fort

Government
  - Mayor: Dávid Radivojevics (Ind.)

Population (2025)
  - Total: 2,011
- Time zone: UTC+1 (CET)
  - Summer (DST): UTC+2 (CEST)
- Area code: 72

Nagykozár (historically spelled Nagy Kozár; Croatian: Veliki Kozar; German: Kosar or Kossar) is a village in Baranya County, Hungary, just west of Pécs, the county capital; its local council also represents neighboring Bogád and Romonya. Traditionally, most of the village inhabitants were either Croats or Danube Swabians, with Hungarians in the minority. The area entered history as a portion of the Hunnic and Avar domains, and, during the Hungarian conquest, was likely colonized by Khazars of the Kabar tribe, who may be the source of its root name (Kozár). The locality itself was reliably attested in 1332, only to be ransacked two centuries later by the Ottoman occupiers. The South Slavic population fluctuated during the Habsburg reconquest, when "Rascian" colonists gave way to Šokci, who came to view thelselves as a Croat subgroup. Later in the 18th century, Nagykozár was a target for Swabian colonization.

Within the Hungarian partition of Austria-Hungary, the village functioned as a hub of the Pannon wine region (though with fluctuations caused by pests), and also provided wagoners for coal extracted in the nearby Mecsek range. Baranya's minorities became exposed to Magyarization, either voluntary or state-enforced; Nagykozár had one of the few regional state schools, which acculturated Croats and Swabians into the mainstream. Upon the end of World War I, the entire region was under a Yugoslav occupation, then briefly administered by the left-wing "Baranya Republic", and finally recaptured by Regency Hungary. The latter conservative entity re-initiated Magyarization, while also repressing peasant unrest. The village surrendered to the Red Army during the Budapest offensive, with only some Swabian resistance; local Swabians were largely spared deportation during the mass expulsions of 1945–1948. The Croats, meanwhile, were closely supervised by the postwar communist regime during the Tito–Stalin split of 1948–1953.

Beginning in the 1960s, when Hungary took up "Goulash Communism", Nagykozár's co-operative was at the forefront of an agricultural boom, experienced throughout Baranya. Relative prosperity came with an increased drive toward assimilation, which the authorities hoped to discourage by financing Croat and Swabian cultural bodies. Voluntary Magyarization was enhanced upon the end of communism: by 1996, Nagykozár had begun functioning as a suburb of Pécs, with new arrivals vastly outnumbering the more established local families. Though Croats and Swabians, taken together, only account for a quarter of the resulting population, they continue to maintain a cultural profile, and have distinct political representation.

== Geography ==
Like Pécs, Nagykozár is located at the foot of the Mecsek. Actor György Barkó, who lived some of his final years in the village, selected it because it resembled his hilly birthplace in rural Transylvania, rather than the Great Hungarian Plain. The village is additionally close to the Villány Mountains (located to its south), and as such sits on a rhyolite unit named after its central spot, Vokány. Newer layers of soil belong to the "Cserdi Formation", presenting as Permian-era molasses with no known fossils.

The industry-adjacent area was traditionally supplied by a large number of springs, though most have dried up or were heavily polluted—requiring water to be brought in from the Danube and the Pécsi-víz. The Vasas-Belvárdi stream, which flows through that sector of Baranya, feeds into thermal waters and is thus protected from household usage. As such, in 2003 Nagykozár has asked Pécs municipality for additional water rights, in order to expand its own sewage system.

== History ==
=== Origins ===
According to archeologist Attila Kiss, the present-day locality may have had a Hunnic presence during the Migration Period. This hypothesis hinges on the notes left in 1900 by the engineer Antal Szinink, who discovered a trove and a burial ground (that he identified as "Turkic") on the village side that is closest to Uszög field, itself a known site for Hunnic finds. Nagykozár's site was briefly occupied by the Pannonian Avars: Pécs's Janus Pannonius Museum preserves Avar items found on village grounds, namely a golden fibula and silver earrings.

The village name is widely thought to derive from the Khazars, some of whom had joined in the 10th-century Hungarian migration to the region. Based on accounts in the 14th-century Chronicon Pictum, scholar Árpád Kerékgyártó proposes that Baranya region was settled by the Kabar tribe of Khazars; he also notes that the colonization is attested in local names, including those of Nagykozár and its southwestern neighbor, Kiskozár. The theory is questioned by historians Jeromos Balatinácz and András Csepely-Knorr: though they agree that Baranya was once in the Khazar domain, they describe the locality's name as inherited from the earlier Pannonian Slavs. These two authors suggest Nagykozár owes its name to the Slavic Koazt fort, located just outside its borders.

The existence of "Kozár" was probably first noted in 1058, during the during the Árpádian Kingdom, alongside a satellite hamlet known as Sevenye (or Zsiminye). This mention is preserved through the records of a 1402 dispute between the Diocese of Pécs and the Order of Saint Paul. According to historian Béla Németh, the mention is reliable, as is its description of Nagykozár as a royal estate of Peter Orseolo. Relying on copies purporting to be 11th-century doculents, Németh argues that both localities were at the center of life in the old Baranya county. In Németh's reading, they contributed to repairing Pécs Cathedral after a great fire in 1064. Nagykozár itself was also mentioned in the Angevin era: its name appears as Kozár in the tithe census of 1332. The place was conquered, then depopulated, during the period of Ottoman subjugation. The Ottomans brought in small groups of Serbs, known historically as "Rascians", with Nagykozár as the northernmost point of their colonization. In the tax registers (defterler) of the 1560s and 1580s, "Nagy Kozar" appears as attached to the Sanjak of Mohács, with some 20 households. Under foreign domination, the more radical currents of Reformation, fostered by the Transylvanian principality, could take hold in and around Pécs. During the 1570s, Nagykozár's population appears to have been won over by the Unitarian Church. In the late 17th century, during the final stages of the Sanjak's existence, Nagykozár and Újhegy formed an estate owned by Mostar Beğ of Pécs. He allowed the peasants to use his pastures and orchards, but forbade them from plowing. Koazt was meanwhile used by the Ottoman Army, and survived into at least the 1840s.

Habsburg Hungary took control of the area during the Great Turkish War. The Siege of Pécs was organized by Louis of Baden-Baden in November 1686, chasing the Ottomans from Transdanubia. Baranya remained secured as a Habsburg province during Rákóczi's War of Independence (1703–1711). It was frequently devastated by the Kuruc and the Imperial Army alike, which prompted several locals to declare their nostalgia for Ottoman rule. In that context, those inhabitants who claimed ancestral rights and privileges as Hungarian nobility engaged with the Habsburg government in peaceful litigation, rather than siding with the Kuruc in open revolt. At the general meetings of the nobility in and after 1710, Nagykozár was represented by János Bana; in 1717, he increased his possessions, and consolidated his political standing, by buying off much of the village's remaining land. At the time, Baranya and its neighbor county of Tolna were engaged in a territorial dispute over a strip of land that included Nagykozár.

Nagykozár's attested population c. 1700 was still "Rascian", but it is likely that the place was again empty after the Austrian war of 1716–1718. Upon the subsequent Habsburg consolidation, the area was resettled by other categories of South Slavs. The village, known in the 18th century primarily as Veliki Kozar or simply Kozar, had a Slavic majority, generally classified as Šokci, with a small Hungarian presence. The latter was marginally enforced in 1721–1722 by five families of settlers: Kovács, Berzencei, Tot, Szarvas, and Lukács. Germans arrived in the mid-18th century, during a state-sponsored colonization of "Swabian Turkey". In 1796, Nagykozár was granted its own seal, later used as the basis for its coat of arms.

=== Habsburg-era modernization ===
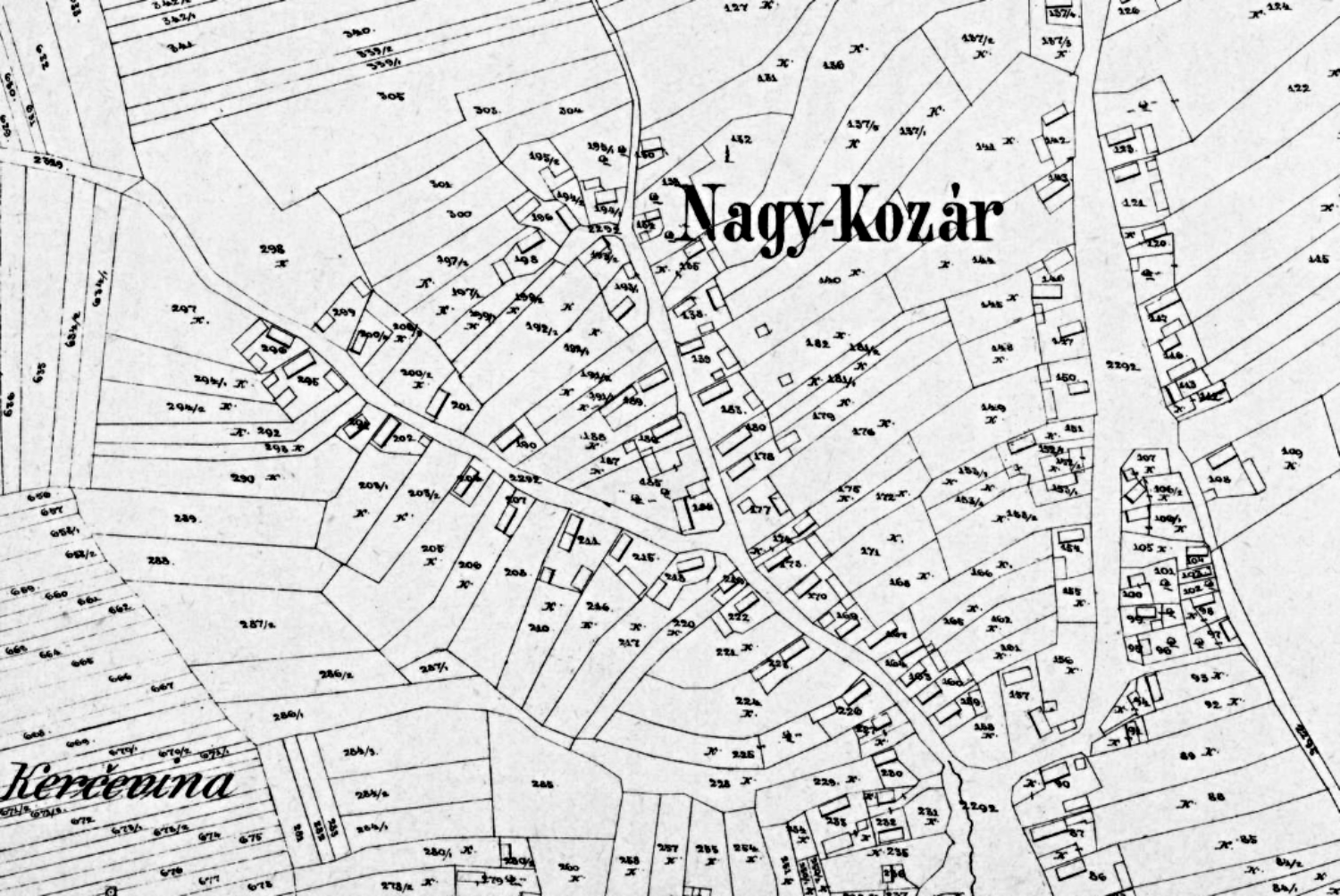
Cadastral map of "Nagy-Kozár" in 1865

The centralized Austrian Empire liberated the serfs of Hungary in the 1860s. In Nagykozár, the resulting land disputes were only resolved by a superior court ruling in 1862. After the self-governing Hungarian entity had been created within Austria-Hungary, the village had 931 inhabitants, the plurality of whom were Šokci or Croats. In 1886, they were visited by writer Nikola Tordinac from Croatia-Slavonia, who recorded their customs in a monograph and commented favorably on their high literacy rate (but also, more pessimistically, on their voluntary Magyarization). After the start of coal mining in the Mecsek range, the village Croats also went into the business of transporting and selling coal. Nagykozár participated to the economy with vineyards, included in the Pannon wine region. In 1876, its wine production suffered major destruction following infestation by moths (Sparganothis pilleriana), though it still large vineyards, alongside meadows, or csairék, during Tordinac's stays. Towards the end of the 19th century, grapes were still cultivated on the hills facing Uszög, but were later replaced with wattles. The fields extending between Nagykozár and Pécs's Luft-kolonia suburb was used for military exercises by the Common Army's 52nd regiment and the local home guard. In September 1892, these were personally reviewed by Franz Joseph I, the King of Hungary.

In 1884, Nagykozár's sixty-some schoolchildren were nominally enlisted at the village Catholic school, but no teachers were present. The situation was reviewed with indignation by Pécsi Figyelő newspaper, which noted that the village instead had four active taverns, since many landowners were putting to use their liquor licenses. An office of the Magyar Posta opened in Nagykozár in January 1898. In January 1902, the local agriculturalist Béni Liebbard reported that wine production was improving for the first time with the planting of American rootstock. From 1900, Nagykozár was one of only five villages in Baranya to have a non-religious, state-sponsored school. The choice is explained by historian László Szita as having to do with its multiethnic population, which government intended to fully Magyarize, but also as doing little to overcome the "backwardness" of the place. Nagykozár made the national news in early 1904, when a local man, Stipo Brandic, roasted his infant child on an open flame, before being seized by other peasants.

Also in 1904, the Interior Ministry changed the locality's official name into Nagykozár, declaring that variants such as Nagy Kozár were obsolete. A portion of the village Hungarians was by then seeking new social and economic opportunities by emigrating to the United States—and thus ignoring warnings from Hungarian nationalists. These argued that the New World was a mirage propped up by political agents, and that: "in Hungary and especially in Baranya, the diligent, hardworking, thrifty person can still make a living." Nagykozár and Romonya were only served by a dirt road leading to Kiskozár. Its maintenance was a point of contention with Baranya's county officials, who refused to finance the project (while observing that Nagykozár's inhabitants had no money to spare on such works). Nagykozár was considered as a station on the 1905 blueprint of a state railway linking Pécs to Pécsvárad and Bátaszék. By 1909, the project had been altered, with the planned station moved north, to Hosszúhetény.

In 1908, the village was recognized by the Interior Ministry, which transferred here the Pécs District notary and archive; these had been originally housed in Pőspökbogád. On 29 December 1910, landowner István Muszti and schoolteacher Lajos Csernyánszky co-founded a Catholic reading circle, which aimed to unify the various ethnic groups in the village, while also keeping socialist propaganda in check. Tensions between ethnic groups still flared up following 1911 elections for the position of village judge, when only German candidates qualified. As reported by the journalists at Pécsi Napló, "constant unrest" spread among the local Croats, whose hostility was only quelled in January 1914, when a man named Márk Novákovics was elected as chief justice. Other ethnic disputes followed. As claimed in February by the Budapesti Hírlap, a local German notability, Jakab Schváb, interrupted a social event and "suddenly declared that all Hungarians should be expelled from the restaurant."

In May 1916, at the height of World War I, Nagykozár's food storages were raided by burglars. The Gendermerie placed the blame on a group of nomadic Romanies, led by Mózes Kovács. During the subsequent chase, Kovács and his followers escaped into the woods of Magyarsarlós. Ethnic clashes resumed around the same time, when the new Swabian judge, Antal Müller, was mocked and assailed by two Croatian nationalists (one of whom was a Hussar on leave). Acting in self-defense, Müller eviscerated them with a sword. In August 1917, Hungarian wagoner István Szemes, who had stood by as one of his colleagues had verbally abused Šokci boys, was killed in retaliation by the latter.

=== Yugoslav interval and 1921 restoration ===
In 1914–1918, Nagykozár provided 250 inhabitants as soldiers, of whom 48 died on the battlefield. The civilian villagers were meanwhile struggling to make ends meet. During a Catholic festival held in June 1917, Pécsi Napló's local envoy reported that Nagykozár's Croat and Hungarian elders were feeling pessimistic about material conditions; patriotic sentiment was maintained by the new local priest, János Novákovics. The end of war and the dissolution of Austria-Hungary rendered uncertain the fate of Baranya as a whole. At the time, Hugh Seton-Watson, the British political scientist, argued that the region was in a "gray zone" of territories that could be just as likely be assigned to the Hungarian Republic or to the emerging Kingdom of Yugoslavia.

In November 1918, as per the Armistice of Belgrade, the Royal Serbian Army, soon after transformed into the Royal Yugoslav Army, moved into the county, placing it under a temporary occupation. The Hungarian population was initially welcoming or indifferent, but turned to rioting upon being notified that Yugoslavia was moving to annex the province. From March 1919, following the establishment of a Hungarian Soviet Republic in Budapest, Baranya as a whole experienced a surge of leftism, which was nonetheless anti-Yugoslav and tinged by nationalism. Nagykozár itself was a local hub of the National Smallholders and Agrarian Workers Party (OKGFP), which espoused an anti-communist platform. In May 1919, the group set up its Baranya branch, electing Nagykozár's István Muszti as its provisional chairman. In August, the OKGFP held one of its rallies in the village. Speakers included Mihály Mihalics, who addressed the Croats in "Šokac".

While the Treaty of Versailles and the Treaty of Trianon both recognized Pécs and most of Baranya as rightfully Hungarian, the Yugoslavs considered creating a "Baranya Republic", to function as a buffer zone. By July 1920, this concept had earned backing from the Socialists of Pécs, who feared that the ultra-conservative Regency regime, which had toppled the Soviet government, would destroy their gains. On 14 August 1921, as Yugoslav forces were evacuating, artist Petar Dobrović established a leftist "Serbian–Hungarian Baranya–Baja Republic", which nominally included Pécs and its periphery. That regime only lasted five days, being taken down by the Regency, which thus secured its southern border.

The conservative restoration was welcomed by the OKGFP, with Muszti claiming that he had served in the resistance against "Serbian occupation and communism". In June 1922, the same politician, who represented Baranya in the Diet of Hungary, organized the unveiling of a commemorative monument to villagers killed in World War I—a Pietà, done in white marble by Jenő Vogl. Reporting on this display of loyalism, Dunántúl paper claimed that the locality as a whole had a "linguistically mixed, but Hungarian-feeling, population", also noting that one of the speeches had to be delivered in Croatian for "those who do not only speak Hungarian." Around then, Nagykozár had 1,010 inhabitants, and its own telegraph station.

=== Interwar and World War II ===
In the following two decades, the Regency dealt with acts of peasant unrest, including at Nagykozár. In August 1927, Muszti witnessed as his and his neighbors' property caught fire; the villagers had to be forced by the Gendarmerie into putting it out. The regime also reimposed unpopular parish taxes in support of the Catholic diocese. In 1930, Baranya's chief justice ordered the peasants of Nagykozár, Romonya and Magyarsarlós to pay up their accumulated taxes in manual labor.

The village was still home to socialists. It sent one delegate to the Baranya congress of the Social Democratic Party, which was held in May 1928. One of the local leftists, Márk Czinkovics, had returned with his family from the Soviet Union. The authorities reportedly harassed and humiliated him, refusing to recognize his Russian wife. The regime also embarked on a stated mission to Magyarize the Swabians and Šokci. Until 1937, the effort was led by a local school principal, who was nonetheless denounced by Muszti for alleged irregularities (and then cleared of the charges by the local inspectorate). The school was beset with problems into the next decade. A public audit of May 1940 found that "the constant changes of teachers" had left these unresolved, with the headmaster's lounge being "completely uninhabitable from a public-health point of view".

Nagykozár's population, as recorded in the 1930 census, was made up of 462 Germans and 395 South Slavs, all but one of whom declared themselves "Šokci" rather than Croats; there were also 144 Hungarians. The village Swabians remained active culturally and politically under the protection of Nazi Germany: in February 1939, Jakab Schváb set up a local chapter of the German Folk Culture Association. At the height of World War II, on 26 June 1943, Nagykozár, officially described as a "Croatian-German-speaking commune", inaugurated a monument to the Levente. The event was attended by peasants from across the area and by county notabilities; it also witnessed a football match between the local team, Nagykozári LE, and the weaker Pécsi LE, unexpectedly ending in a draw. Accepted into the Unity Party, Muszti was still a player in regional politics, and in January 1944 was representing landowners within Baranya county assembly.

During June 1944, Nagykozár and other Swabian communities were included on a fund-collecting tour for the Waffen-SS. The village population lived through the first weeks of a Nazi-controlled regime, established in October 1944. This was just ahead of the Soviet advances into Hungary. On 26 November, the 57th Army was outside Pécs, having chased out the Brandenburgers; the 6th Guards Rifle Corps took Nagykozár on the 28th.

Czinkovics's son Ede Csabai personally welcomed the Soviets into the village and joined their command post in Rédics. On the other side, Baranya's Swabians were being trained by the paramilitary Volksbund, and made to fight the advancing Soviets. Nagykozár provided only three such recruits. One of them was captured and charged with war crimes in 1945, whereupon he stated that he and the other "uneducated farmers" had been cinically manipulated by the Nazified elite. During April 1945, Baranya came to be raided by Yugoslav Partisans, who often imposed their will on the local units of the county police officers. One of the latter reported that the visitors were terrorizing Nagykozár's population, seeking to annex it and other such localities, including Pécs, to their Democratic Federal Yugoslavia.

=== FKgP rule and early communism ===
Upon the war's end, the Regency was democratized, and then replaced by the Second Hungarian Republic. From April 1946, Baranya's schools, including Nagykozár, could hold classes in native Slavic tongues. Within this new setting, Muszti was accepted into the dominant Independent Smallholders' Party (FKgP), but then purged from it in December 1948. The newly established Socialist Federal Republic of Yugoslavia continued to exercise influence over regular citizens. According to a May 1947 report by Pécs's city hall, Nagykozár was the main center of Yugoslavism. Its Croat villagers were refusing to pay their share of the war reparations, "since Slavs are among the winners".

Under FKgP supervision, the locality was receiving Hungarians expelled from Czechoslovakia. The first of these to arrive reportedly met with stiff opposition and sabotage actions from the Yugoslavist Croats. The refugees were also caught up in a land dispute with Romonya: government ordered Nagykozár to hand its neighbors an agricultural reserve that Romonya was to distribute in the land reform; Nagykozár refused, even when taken to court, arguing that the land was being used to feed its new population. Several "Czechoslovak" arrivals, adhering to the Reformed Church, became a "scattered congregation" of the Pécs pastors. In time, they constructed their own church building, in Bóly.

Throughout Hungary, many of the former German settlers were expelled to Germany and Austria in 1945–1948, following the Potsdam Agreement. It is not known how many of the Nagykozár Swabians were deported or imprisoned by the Soviet occupation forces, beyond the fact that the village authorities requested for 15 of its Germans to be returned home as proven Hungarian loyalists. In absolute terms, Nagykozár's population had dropped to 744 around 1950. By June 1953, however, the Hungarian People's Republic was still viewing it as a mixture of Hungarians, Germans and Croats; its official newspaper, Dunántúli Napló, reported that communism had improved the peasants' lives, with many youths attending schools in Pécs, but also noted that the ethnic communities were largely self-segregated.

After the start of mandatory collectivization, Nagykozár had a small-scale, state-sanctioned co-operative, recognized as one of the county's Slav-dominated enterprises in the agricultural field. Its founder was József Lukics, who left soon after to engage in regional-level politics within the Working People's Party and its trade union, MÉDOSZ. In June 1949, with encouragement from the regime, Pécs's credit union expelled from.its ranks "enemies" and "kulaks"—examples included Muszti and another Nagykozár landowner, Péter Lenkei. Most resources in Baranya continued to be held by individual farmers, which caused frustration in politival circles. The task of changing this pattern fell primarily on the new state farm, Pécsi Állami Gazdaság (PÁG); by 1955 it had more land than all of the Pécs-area co-operatives combined, including plots in Nagykozár.

Hungarian communists also followed Soviet commands in respect to the Tito–Stalin split of 1948–1953. The country welcomed in pro-Soviet Yugoslavs, including Lazar Brankov, on whose proposal Pécs became a logistical hub for anti-Tito propaganda in South Slavic languages. During elections for the Hungarian Alliance of South Slavs in July 1948, Nagykozár's peasants were enouraged to swear off Titoism. In 1953, a "South Slavic cultural group", formed by the Budapest Croatian School, visited the village and performed a bilingual program, in at attempt at fostering integration. In early 1956, singer Eva Selej established Nagykozár's own cultural society of Croats.

=== Entering "Goulash Communism" ===
Pécs and its satellites experienced some unrest during the first stages of the Hungarian Revolution of 1956, with local branches of the Petőfi Circle and the MEFESZ student union established in early October. This episode was ended by the Hungarian People's Army, whose 14th Rifle Regiment entered the area on 26 October. It shot on protesters in Pécs, disarmed anti-communists guerrillas moving in from Bonyhád, and finally hunted down dissidents hiding out in the Mecsek. A more serious workers' revolt followed, resulting in Pécs being entirely autonomous, as an experiment in direct democracy and workers' self-management. As writer László Németh informs, it and other such imdustrial regions were effectively independent "republics". On 28 October, Baranya's revolutionaries voted in a "Workers' National Council", which acted as a government body. Despite its name, it was dominated by the reestablished FKgP and other conservative factions.

Self-government was ended by the Soviet Army, which took Pécs on 4 November. Armed resistance to the invasion was carried out by Mecsek partisans, who managed a successful attack on the people's police station in Pécsvárad before escaping into Yugoslavia. Authoritarian control was then handed by the Soviets to János Kádár's Socialist Workers' Party (MSZMP): on May Day 1957, it signaled its strength by organizing a set of workers' rallies, with some 60,000 showing up in Pécs.

From September 1959, the road linking Nagykozár to Pécs was paved in stone, with funds provided by the District Renovation Scheme. State and local resources were also being invested in culture and sports. During early 1959, the village was one of several Baranya localities to host a workers' club, within an MSZMP pilot project designed to "help disadvantaged workers who live in the countryside." Former Pécsi Vasutas SK goalkeeper Sándor Rácz arrived in Nagykozár as a schoolteacher. Ahead of a Hungarian "Spartakiad" in June 1959, he was reorganizing the village football club, and also setting up a women's volleyball team. In 1962, Nagykozár still held a sizable Swabian community, which attended shows put on by the German Culture Group of Pilisvörösvár.

In 1964, Nagykozár was highlighted as a possible suburb of Pécs, where land for new housing estates was in extremely short supply. As part of an administrative reorganization in February 1966, Bogád and Romonya's village councils had been merged with Nagykozár's. Although the PÁG maintained its overall dominance, structural reforms were introduced c. 1957, when it was divided into "self-accounting economic units". Baranya as a whole began experiencing growth with Kádár's application of "Goulash Communism". The county co-operatives were liberalized, then allowed to engage in agricultural marketing. The village integrated with the new trend: in 1967, the co-operative was enlarged by annexing similar businesses in Romonya and Bogád, and had 430, mostly female, participants. It was housed in the former hunting lodge, and sold its own brand of fruit preserves in the supermarkets of Pécs. The unit also pioneered canned sorbet, made using fruit syrup and iced water, but the product was disliked by many would-be consumers.

By 1968, the co-operative was officially ranked as Baranya's strongest, engaged in socialist competition for national honors. Upon visiting Nagykozár to document its success in January 1969, reporter Christine Merly came to view it as "one of the most beautiful villages in Baranya County", with "uniform white houses and a great number of fir trees". Commercially known as Zengő Gyöngye ("Zengő's Pearl"), the co-operative continued to absorb smaller ones. By 1981, it had 1,300 workers; its land had streched into Berkesd, Hosszúhetény, Kisújbánya, Pereked and Szilágy. Although facing tougher regulations which reduced its profit margin, and incorporating localities that were largely industrialized, it was still a highly successful enterprise, and was investing in additional expansion. The co-operative had adopted an autonomous plan for encouraging youths to take up agriculture: on their wedding day, young employees were guaranteed industrial goods worth 1,000 forints, as well as a calf.

=== Democratization and final assimilation ===
Following local elections in 1971, Antun (Antal) Crnković, who was already serving as head of the village council, was elected to Baranya's county assembly. A village community center, featuring a cinema, was being built in Nagykozár in 1969. In mid-1970, after an agreement between Zengő Gyöngye and the Pécs consumers' co-operative, a new village restaurant was also being constructed. It only opened in summer 1978, with one reviewer praising its "exemplary cleanliness" and "delicious" specialty food, namely stuffed leaves. The same journalist noted that the enterprise could not count on either local customers or tourists, having to organize events in order to survive on the market. At around the same time, Mecseknádasd Savings Cooperative began operating a general store in Nagykozár.

In 1979, the dissolution of Pécs District was being considered, through a series of consultative referendums. One of these was also set to decide on whether Nagykozár should be merged with Magyarsarlós. However, the plan had still not been enacted in 1988, by which time any local referendum would have been legally binding. In 1983, the villagers asked that their homes be connected to the natural gas network, but the community could not provide its required share of the investment. The local council placed blame on the Bogád community, which was significantly poorer but could not be omitted from the contract.

Around 1972, Nagykozár housed 916 inhabitants, of whom 790 were Slavic. By then, the Democratic Association of South Slavs had declared Nagykozár as one of thirteen Šokci villages, within the larger Croat community. The native population was supplemented by new arrivals from Pécs—in 1974, Nagykozár became home to another football goalkeeper, Béla Katzirz. It was here that he raised his handballer son, Dávid Katzirz. In 1987, over 70% of the village population belonged to either Croat or German cultural bodies, but complained about the likelihood of language death, with many children speaking only Hungarian, including at home. According to Crnković, many locals were in mixed marriages with Hungarians, and such households never selected Croatian as their everyday language.

Also in 1987, the village welcome sign had been modified to include "Veliki Kozar". It was soon after vandalized, with Veliki (lit. 'Great') painted over, as a likely political statement about cultural decline. Just shortly after, the communist regime ceded power. A new village council, presided upon by János Bakonyi, obtained an OTP Bank loan, vouched for by Zengő Gyöngye, that allowed for a gas pipeline to be built in mid-1989. During 1991, Nagykozár, Bogádés and Romonya jointly set up a retirement home in the former school complex. Called Geront Hotel, it was meant to cater to the aging population; according to estimates from that period, one fifth of Nagykozár's residents were of retirement age.

According to a 1992 count, the locality was 40% South Slavic, 31% German, and 29% Hungarian. The recorded total was 989 in 1994. Around 1996, the demographic landscape in Nagykozár was changed by new arrivals from Pécs. A new row of houses had been built on the border between Nagykozár and Pécs's Újhegy neighborhood, by urbanites seeking to reduce their living expenses. The post-communist transition also resulted in changes to the agricultural economy. In 1992, Zengő Gyöngye was seeking to maintain a market presence with quince-flavored ice cream. The enterprise as a whole was failing: in April 2000, after its budget had been halved, it was declared insolvent by the Baranya County Court. All its five farms up went for public auction.

== Demographics and economy ==
Nagykozár's population effectively doubled between 1993 and 2008 (when it was recorded as 1,765 inhabitants); 14 new streets appeared, in a horseshoe shape, around the old core of seven streets. The proportion of traditional ethnic groups was by then greatly reduced: in 2008, Croats and Swabians together were only 25% of the total population. In the new context of the 2000s, the village reported full employment, with no locals being available for manual labor on public projects. It nonetheless continued to meet some financial hurdles, with the public budget spent largely on better sewage, at the expense of road-repair. A "Pécs Micro-Regional Association Council" was established in late 2010, with the goal of coordinating public services in and around the city. Thirty-nine localities were represented, with Nagykozár's mayor, Mária Szentirmayné Kiss, voted in as head of the social works committee. In 2012, Szentirmayné Kiss raised housing taxes to 12,000 forint per year, in an effort to reduce perennial deficits.

The population continued to grow due to migration from Pécs, surpassing 2,000 people in 2017. Properties other than residential were also acquired by these new arrivals. In February 2017, Bertalan Tóth, a leader of the Hungarian Socialist Party, declared ownership of a forest located within Nagykozár's borders. The then-mayor, György Selmeczi claimed at the time that Nagykozár was also leading Baranya's villages in terms of purchasing power, at 3 million forint per capita. A sewage system had been built at a cost of 600 milion forint, while local roads had been repaired. In 2025, alongside Bogád and six other localities, Nagykozár applied for a state grant of 31,502,180 forint, in hopes of acquiring a system of LED street lights.

== Culture ==
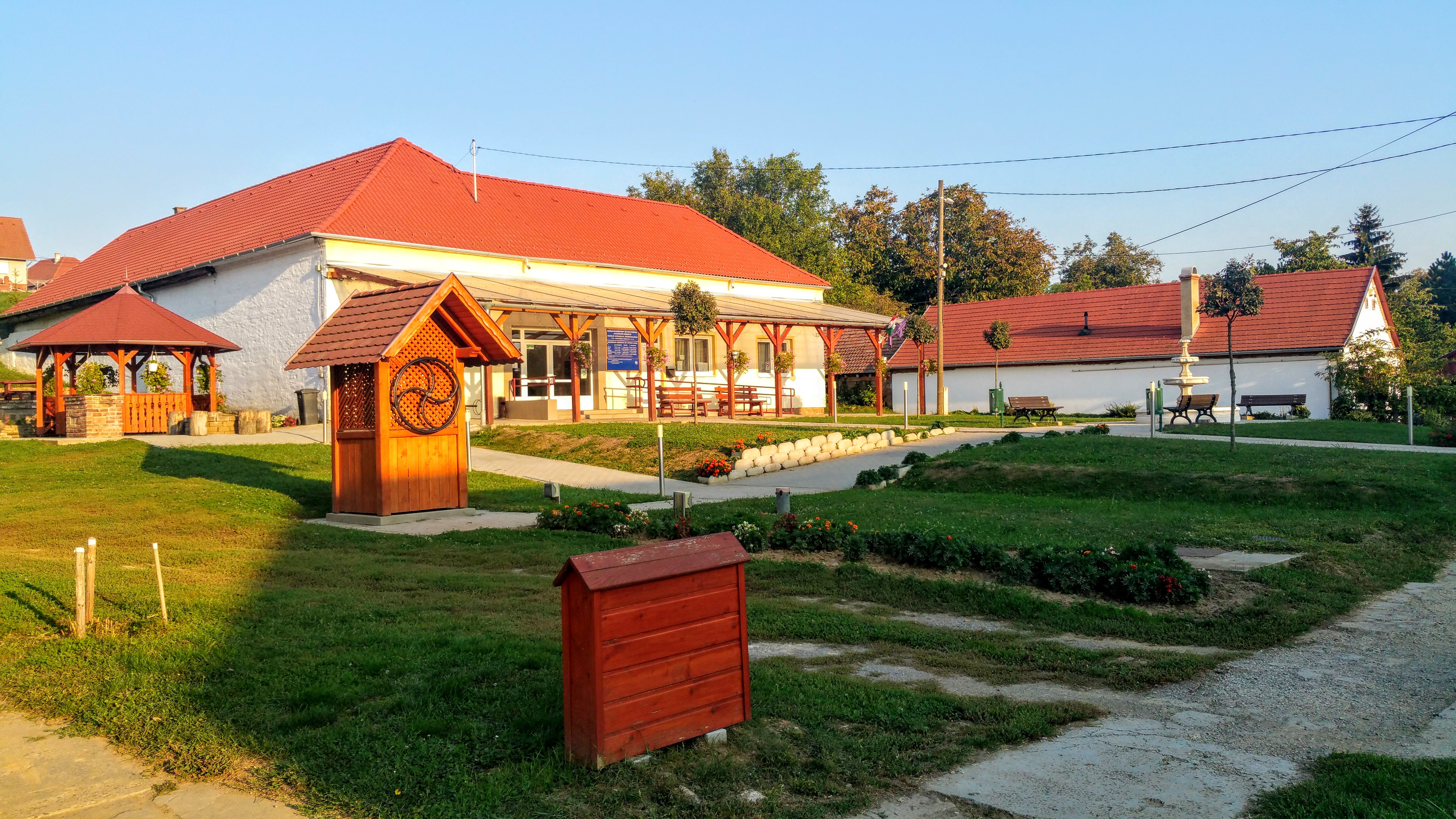
Nagykozár's community center in 2018

Croat and Hungarian Catholics view the Nagykozár as dedicated to John the Baptist, whose feast day was also a main holiday in the village calendar. As a traditionally Šokci place, Nagykozár had distinct traditions, such as a female-dominated Carnival called "Shameful Monday" (Sramotno Ponedjeljak). In this setting, women were recognized by men for their year-long labor, and allowed to go a full day "without even picking a needle". In addition to forming their own Carnival "army" with its own "banner", women spent the holiday eating, drinking, dancing, and jumping over fires. The local Croats' ballads and sayings were catalogued by Nikola Tordinac in 1886, though his book was only published exactly a century later.

There was no longer a village school by 2008, with most children being sent to Pécs; a kindergarten was active, for toddlers in both Nagykozár and Bogád. Despite the drop in percentages for the two historically dominant ethnicities, the village established a German self-government unit in 2005, and a Croat one in 2006. Both became mainly preoccupied with preserving their respective cultural heritage, and together have organized Nagykozár wine competitions. By 2025, during Dávid Radivojevics's term as village mayor, Nagykozár was also hosting an annual culinary festival dedicated to stuffed cabbage.

As part of the post-communist migration wave, Nagykozár became the primary home of senior actor György Barkó. He purchased a family farm that he decorated in the style of Csángó dwellings (reflecting his own origins in present-day Romania). He was still mainly residing in the village in 2014, after the death of his actress wife, Julia Bereczky. The village hosts ERLA Studios, which is used as a television set by the National Theatre of Pécs. Production of such shows peaked in 2020, at the height of the COVID-19 pandemic.

== Notable residents ==
- György Barkó (1931–2024), actor
- Béla Katzirz (born 1953), football player
- Dávid Katzirz (born 1980), handball player
- Bertalan Tóth (born 1975), politician
