= Hoppál =

Hoppál is a surname. Notable people with the surname include:

- Bulcsú Hoppál (born 1974), Hungarian theologian and philosopher
- Péter Hoppál (born 1972), Hungarian politician
