= György Barkó =

Romanian and Hungarian actor (1931–2024)

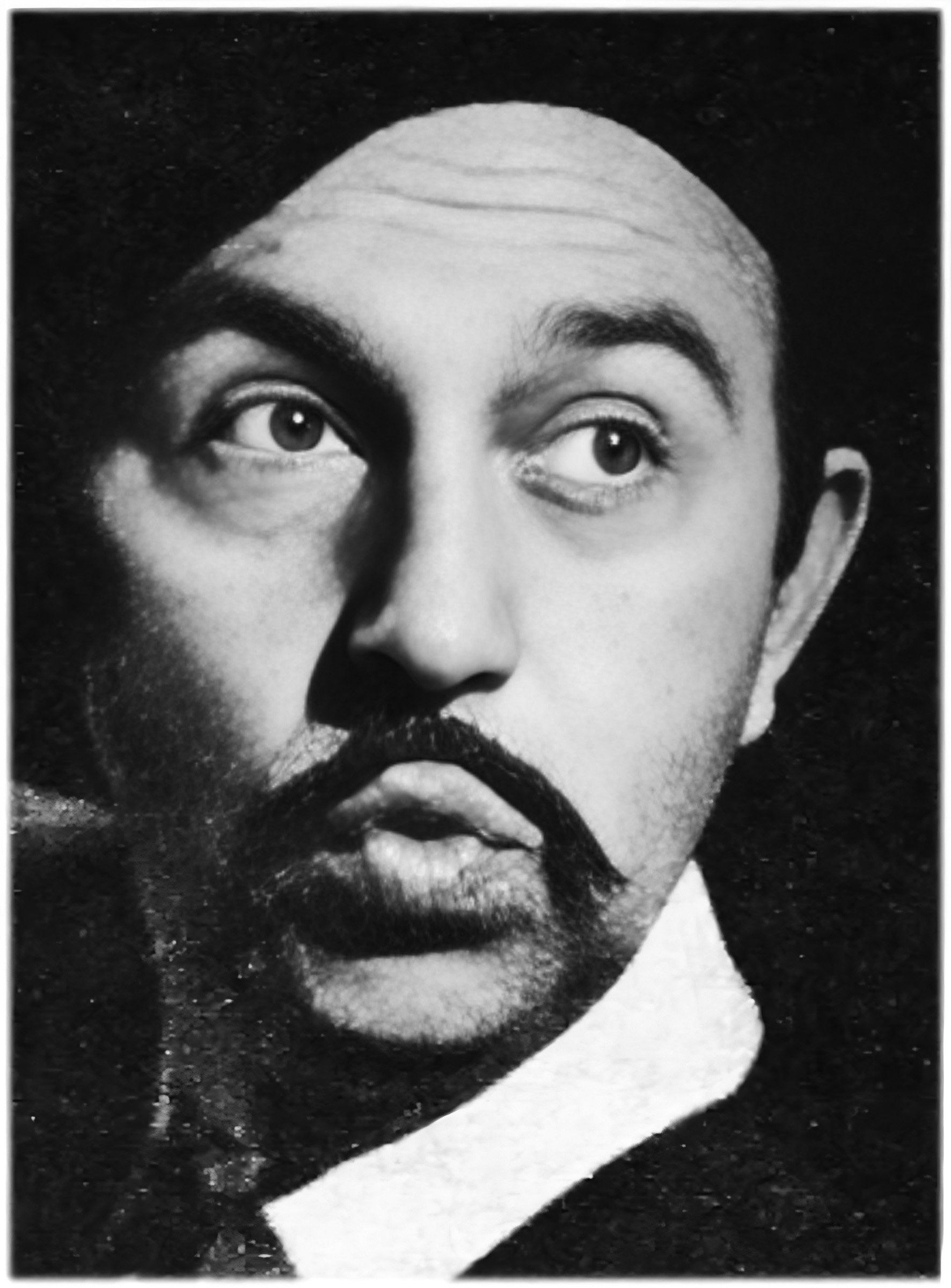
- Barkó in 1976
- Born: 18 July 1931; Purcăreni, Brașov County, Kingdom of Romania
- Died: 30 January 2024 (aged 92); Pécs, Hungary
- Occupations: Comedian, actor, farmer
- Years active: 1950–2014
- Spouse: Julia Bereczky
- Children: 1
- Awards: Pécs City Arts Award, 2006; Hilda Gobbi Lifetime Achievement Award, 2014

György Barkó (18 July 1931 – 30 January 2024) was a Romanian and Hungarian actor. Born to Csángó parents in the Kingdom of Romania, he joined his father in Northern Transylvania during World War II, becoming a subject of Regency Hungary. He spent much of his childhood in the Curvature Carpathians, before completing his secondary education in Sepsiszentgyörgy. During the late 1940s, the area was re-annexed by Romania, and Barkó reverted to his original citizenship; he began studying drama in Cluj in 1950, just shortly after the country had been turned into a communist republic. He found permanent employment at Cluj State Hungarian Theater, where he came to be used extensively in plays directed by György Harag and Gábor Tompa. Barkó developed as a character actor, achieving fame within the Hungarian community, and in Romania as a whole, for his roles in András Sütő's comedies and dramas.

Barkó and his actor wife Julia Bereczky resettled in the Hungarian People's Republic in 1989, at the same time as their colleague Sándor Héjja; they settled in Pécs, as employees of that city's own company. The decision was taken after the consolidation of national communism in Romania, which had encouraged anti-Hungarian sentiment, and followed incidents in which Barkó had been brutalized by agents of the Miliția. He stayed in Pécs, and later in Nagykozár, after the end of communism in Hungary and in Romania, only making sporadic returns to Cluj. In his new country, Barkó was appreciated for his diction and his understanding of peasant psychology, and enjoyed portraying rustic storytellers such as Kálmán Mikszáth. He had numerous film roles during his senior years, appearing for instance in Béla Tarr's Sátántangó (1994).

== Biography ==
=== Origins and early life ===
Barkó was born in Purcăreni, Brașov County, on 18 July 1931. He was of Csángó background, specifically from the portion of that ethno-religious community which identifies as Hungarian. He had a slightly older brother. Their mother was a homemaker, whereas their father, who took György on trips around the area, was a teacher and cantor for the Evangelical Lutheran Church. The future actor was born a citizen of the Romanian Kingdom, and his early education was in a Romanian school, since his church school had closed down; as a child, he regularly worked on the family farm.

By the time of World War II, Barkó's father had been conscripted for labor service, and sent into Bessarabia. In August 1940, following the Second Vienna Award, Northern Transylvania was assigned to Regency Hungary, moving the Hungarian–Romanian border just north of Purcăreni. Barkó Sr deserted and defected, then sent for his family to join him in Hungary. The Barkós lived for a while in Komandó, Háromszék County, where Barkó Sr had a teaching job. The spot was high up in the Curvature Carpathians, and only reachable by funicular, the functioning of which fascinated György. He was sent to Hungarian schools, including, from 1942, the Reformed College in Sepsiszentgyörgy.

In 1944, the area was retaken by Romania, which became a communist-style republic in 1948. Barkó still resided and studied in Sepsiszentgyörgy—now known again under its Romanian name of "Sfântu Gheorghe". He finally graduated in 1950, and began considering a career in acting—dashing his father's hopes that he would go into engineering. He auditioned for the István Szentgyörgyi Theater Institute in Cluj. He did not expect to pass the entry exam (having been asked to refrain from reciting the poem he had prepared, and to tell instead ethnic jokes about the Székelys), but found out from the newspapers that he was admitted. His teachers and mentors included Ernő Szabó, Nóra Tessitori, and Lili Poór, all of whom reportedly saw in him "the actor who never spoils a role."

Upon his graduation in 1954, Barkó was employed by the People's Hungarian Theater in Sfântu Gheorghe. He gave a celebrated performance as Tulipán, in Gergely Csiky's A Proletárok. Shortly after, he became a member of the Cluj State Hungarian Theater. In 1955, he appeared there in Jenő Heltai's Silent Knight; he was panned by Tamás Deák in Útunk journal: "There is no excuse for the tasteless comedy of György Barkó in the role of the cleverly politicized court jester". As one of the guards in the 1960 production of Antigone, he was commended by Új Élet magazine for "the excellent effect [he achieved] by identifying with the role".

=== With Harag ===
In time, he emerged as a favorite of director György Harag—for long, he only took "episodic roles" in Harag productions, stating that he actually preferred them to leads. One of their early collaborations was on Ștafeta nevăzută, a communist work by Paul Everac. Presented by the Cluj troupe in homage to Liberation from Fascist Occupation Day 1964, it had Barkó as one of the antagonists (an industrial foreman who devises methods of slacking off). He and the rest of the Cluj troupe were co-opted by János Márton's folk-theater company, with a production of Énekes madár. Unusually, the play was not attributed to its known and modern author, Áron Tamási, but rather presented as ancestrally Székely.

Barkó himself noted having had great success in András Sütő's Palm Sunday of a Horse Dealer, which ran for eleven seasons. The role of an "eternal servant" gave him trouble, since Harag expected "something new". As writer Lilla Szépréti observes, he ended up creating "the oppressed, humiliated and saddened man of all times, one of the most authentic figures in the performance." His contributions as a character actor were positively covered by Teatrul magazine of Bucharest: in 1973, it commended Barkó for the "very good moments" he provided in I Choose the Tower, adapted by Harag from a text by Géza Páskándi. In 1976, the director staged one of Sütő's tragedies, Star at the Stake, with Sándor Héjja in the main role—as Michael Servetus. Harag was praised by columnist Lajos Kántor for his casting choices, including Barkó as Nicholas de la Fontaine.

Barkó's 125th role came later in 1976, when he was one of the sons in Desire Under the Elms, by Eugene O'Neill. As part of Cîntarea României festival in mid-1977, the Harag–Barkó team staged Mihnea Gheorghiu's Patetica '77. This was a large-scale production dramatizing events from Romanian War of Independence (marking its centennial); according to reviewer Aurel Bădescu, Barkó's interpretation was highly memorable, standing out even when a hundred other actors were parading on the stage. Later in 1977, Barkó appeared in György Kovács' last directorial effort, as Giovanni in Luigi Pirandello's Henry IV. According to critic Ileana Berlogea, Kovács's vision was to have him and other protagonists (including Héjja as Landolfo) as the modern answer to a Greek chorus, the "emotional but powerless witness to the destiny of a tragic hero." Harag used him in One Terrible Sunday Afternoon, filmed for the Magyar section of the Romanian state television in 1975. Described by Szépréti as a straightforward performance, it made him instantly popular with the whole of Romania's Hungarian community; Romanian critic Ioana Mălin was also impressed by the production, including by Barkó's "masterful acting". It was followed shortly by a similarly popular televised version of Sütő's Palm Sunday. The director also took him on for a series of short films, and he was asked to do screen tests in the Hungarian People's Republic. Though he was promised a role in a feature-length production by László Vitéz, the entire project was shelved by the Cluj section of the Romanian Communist Party.

Barkó's focus on small parts postponed his breakthrough to 1979, when he became widely celebrated as Bubnov in The Lower Depths. During the same season, János Márton directed him as the public-bath owner in Ödön von Horváth's Dorf ohne Männer. With this comedic contribution, Barkó's received praise from critic Constantin Cubleșan. The following year, he was Spirache Necșulescu in a havily modified version of Tudor Mușatescu's Titanic Waltz, done at the Hungarian Theater by Aureliu Manea. Reviewer Doina Modola observed that he played Spirache as appropriately "faint, subdued by the female cast." He also returned on television in Gábor Dehel's play, Időzavarban, which had Dehel himself as a Gestapo officer. Barkó starred as a heroic prisoner, who pretends to be an underground communist in order to save the real culprit. In 1981, he drew praise for his on-stage role as András, a personification of the people, in Sándor Csép's Mi, Bethlen Gábor. Also then, he worked with director Gábor Tompa, who cast him as both the house inspector and Ivan the Terrible in Mikhail Bulgakov's comedy, Ivan Vasilievich. His twin role was well-received by reviewer László Lázár, who called him "irresistible". The 1984–1985 season premiered Tompa's version of Anton Chekhov's Three Sisters.

=== Repatriation ===
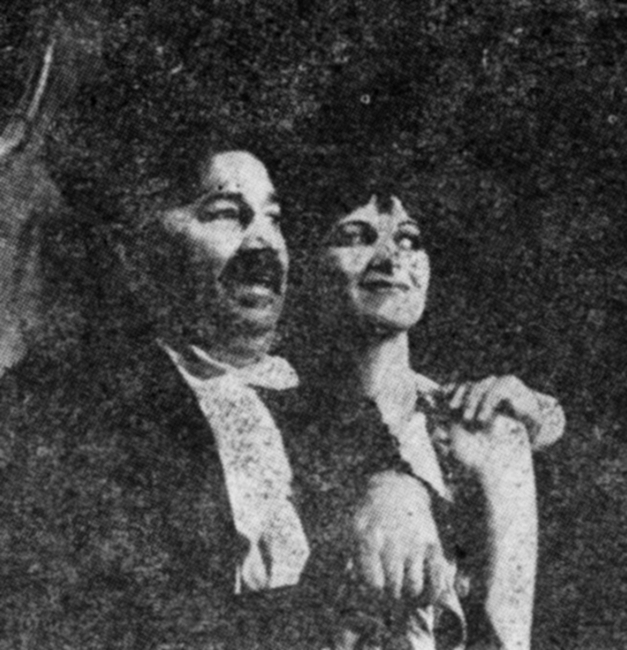
Barkó (Eugeniusz) and wife Julia Bereczky (Eugenia) in the 1985 staging of Tango

Barkó described himself as a victim of anti-Hungarian discrimination, which he saw as actively encouraged by the Romanian communist leader, Nicolae Ceaușescu. According to reports in the Hungarian American paper Katolikus Magyarok Vasárnapja, by December 1984 the communist Miliția was proclaiming arbitrary curfews in Sfântu Gheorghe, and imposing them with brutality. Barkó was caught up in the events: in June 1985, after performing in the city and going out for drinks, he was reportedly detained and beaten up by the police force, who broke three of his ribs and both of his arms. This was partly confirmed by Barkó in a 2014 interview: "during a tour of Székely Land in 1989 [sic], four Romanian policemen stopped me on the street and beat me for no reason, breaking both my arms." He reported the matter to the local party man, who was a Hungarian from Purcăreni; when this potentate shrugged off his complaint, the actor angrily stated that he regretted ever having known him. In the late 1980s, he submitted an application to emigrate into Hungary.

Barkó still accepted significant roles at Cluj-Napoca (as the city was known by then). He was Eugeniusz in Sławomir Mrożek's Tango (directed by Tompa in 1985), and, as scholar Mircea Ghițulescu writes, showed "a perfect expressiveness of decrepit cowardice". By 1988, he had been cast as one of The Gravediggers in Tompa's version of Hamlet—the characters were re-imagined as "almost constant companions, assistants, agents, props, and loyal partners of Hamlet". He was also cast in Tompa's version of Sütő's Happy Lament for a Wandering Speck of Dust; according to reviewer István Nánay: "[Tompa added] dominant character traits that made the work itself deeper and more metaphorical. [...] György Barkó plays Fügedes' blindness, his deception, his domination over his family, but above all his tragedy, with poignant power." A representative of the Pécs National Theater (PNSz), Róbert Nógrády, happened to see the Hamlet show, and was impressed, offering Barkó a permanent job and an apartment.

The actor and his wife eventually took up the Hungarian offer, leaving for Pécs in February 1989. They were joined by Héjja and his wife Klára Sebők, who similarly complained of constant harassment by Romanian government officials. According to Barkó, the Romanian border guards made a point of humiliating him with a strip search, and also confiscated his luggage. Despite his departure, Barkó remained fond of his native Transylvania, and, while at Pécs, sought out landscapes that reminded him of his home. Shortly after his integration with the new troupe, he starred in Galsaláda, adapted by Károly Szakonyi from various texts by Pongrác Galsai. He was cast as Galsai himself. As the Népszabadság columnist wrote, "[he] does not resemble Galsai in the least. However, [...] some of the physical challenges that evoke Galsai will also be presented to the audience." As noted by Szakonyi, he and Héjja came in with a "beautiful diction" that had been the staple of Transylvanian theaters. Barkó also won praise as Pavel in Szakonyi's (otherwise panned) adaptation of Ivan Turgenev's Fathers and Sons.

The relocation was part of a larger phenomenon. Writer Éva Váli argued in 2008 that: "After 1985, almost half of the [Cluj] company [of actors] moved to Hungary, [but] never found their place there, in the vastly different acting style and hierarchy." In late 1989, Barkó celebrated as Ceaușescu's regime crumbled in December 1989, giving optimistic speeches at the Pécs debate club. As he put it: "When I returned to Cluj as a tourist, I almost burst into tears because several people stopped me and quoted from my former roles."

=== Success in Hungary ===
Despite the difficulties in adaptation, Barkó opted to stay in Hungary, where he found additional success before and after that country's own transition to democracy. In 1990, he was directed by Menyhért Szegvári in Don Carlos, as The Inquisitor, and was remarked by critic István Szilárd for his "terrifying" realism. Barkó also satisfied his desire to act in Hungarian films. He had thirty such credits, beginning with a noted performance in Béla Tarr's Sátántangó (1994). In 1997, while filming on Dezső Zsigmond's Blood of the Rose, he traveled about the Tiszahát region. Using his peasant-and-Csángó background, he befriended and coached his debuting co-star, the real-life shepherd András Szim.

Despite offers to join the more prestigious National Theater Budapest, Barkó remained loyal to Pécs. However, by 1995 he had left the PNSz and was mainly active with the city's Third Theater. Until his retirement at age sixty-two, he gave some 300 performances on those two stages. He continued to act sporadically after that moment. In 1999, he appeared as the narrator, Kálmán Mikszáth, in an adaptation of St. Peter's Umbrella for the Eger Lyceum. For that role, he turned to his childhood experiences:

Playing Mikszáth is like going home to Transylvania and drinking from the purest spring water. I have the feeling that we have brought too much evil onto the stage in recent decades, an evil that is foreign to us, Western, and which we cannot even play from the heart. We have never needed Mikszáth's beautiful language, his Hungarianness, as much as we do now, when a dozen foreign things have stuck to us. I am a Csángó, so my life is a fairy tale. Life has taught the Csángó man two things the hard way: storytelling and hard work.

Cast by Frigyes Gödrös in the 2000 film Glamour, Barkó was, according to author István Szilágyi, the only member of the ensemble to impress, in what was overall an unintentionally "grotesque allegory" of the Holocaust in Hungary. A similar point was made in relation to Man with the Golden Touch, a Mór Jókai novel adapted for the PNSz by Tibor Csizmadia in early 2001. Dramatist Barbara Ary-Nagy argued that Barkó (as Ali Csorbadzsi) provided one of two actors who "work[ed] cleanly", without "false overtones". Later that year, he was used for another production of The Lower Depths, as Luka the pilgrim—redone as a Székely man, with the entire play reset in Central Europe. Theatrologist Imre Nagy calls his moments on stage the "crowning achievement" of László Bagossy Jr's directorial work. For the 2002 season, he was Mr Bódog in Szakonyi's Adáshiba. It was poorly received by Melinda Sőregi of Criticai Lapok journal, largely because the text seemed antiquated and conventional play, allowing only for "the usual actors with their usual gestures." A similar critique came from columnist László Zappe, regarding a new production of Hamlet, done by Iván Hargitai in 2003. Barkó reappeared as a Gravedigger, but was also The Player King and The Ghost; according to Zappe, only the first role matched his talents, whereas his decision to play The Ghost as "decrepit" was both conventional and questionable.

In 2005, Barkó also appeared on national television's Big Read, which promoted classical books. According to critic Klára Varga, he was the only contributor to that campaign who fit in with his role—namely, as Tüskevár's Uncle Matula. At the PNSz, he was used by director János Vincze in a critically acclaimed rendition of Samuel Beckett's Endgame (as Nagg). After a sabbatical caused by health issues, Barkó also made returns to Cluj's Hungarian Theater, and to post-communist Romania: in 2008, he was cast in Tompa's Three Sisters, which was again in production after a 23-years hiatus; the institution offered him benefits as a lifelong employee. In April 2014, after filming had ended on Zolatan Bičkei's Snevani snegovi, Barkó announced that he was no longer going to appear in any other production. By his count, he had had 5,422 performances in his career.

== Personal life ==
In addition to his acting, Barkó was recognized for his horseshoe moustache, which he only shaved once in his entire career. He was married to the actress and director Julia Bereczky (1928–2007), who helped him decide in favor of emigrating. They only had a son, also named György, who fathered four children of his own. By 2006, Julia and György Sr lived on a farm in Nagykozár, where the latter was treating his undisclosed illness. The aging actor remained on that property as a widower, and was still living there in the 2010s. He died in Pécs on 30 January 2024, at the age of 92.

== Awards ==
- Third Prize for Acting, Cîntarea României festival, 1981
- Pécs City Arts Award, 2006
- Hilda Gobbi Lifetime Achievement Award, Hungarian Ministry of Culture, 2014
