= Áron Kovács =

Hungarian politician (born 1979)

Member of the National Assembly
- Assuming office 9 May 2026
- Succeeding: Péter Hoppál
- Constituency: Baranya 2nd

Personal details
- Born: 1979 (age 46–47)
- Party: Tisza

Áron Kovács (born 1979) is a Serbian-born Hungarian politician who was elected member of the National Assembly in 2026. He has been a lecturer in economics at Milton Friedman University since 2019.
