= Szemely =

- Village (Falva)
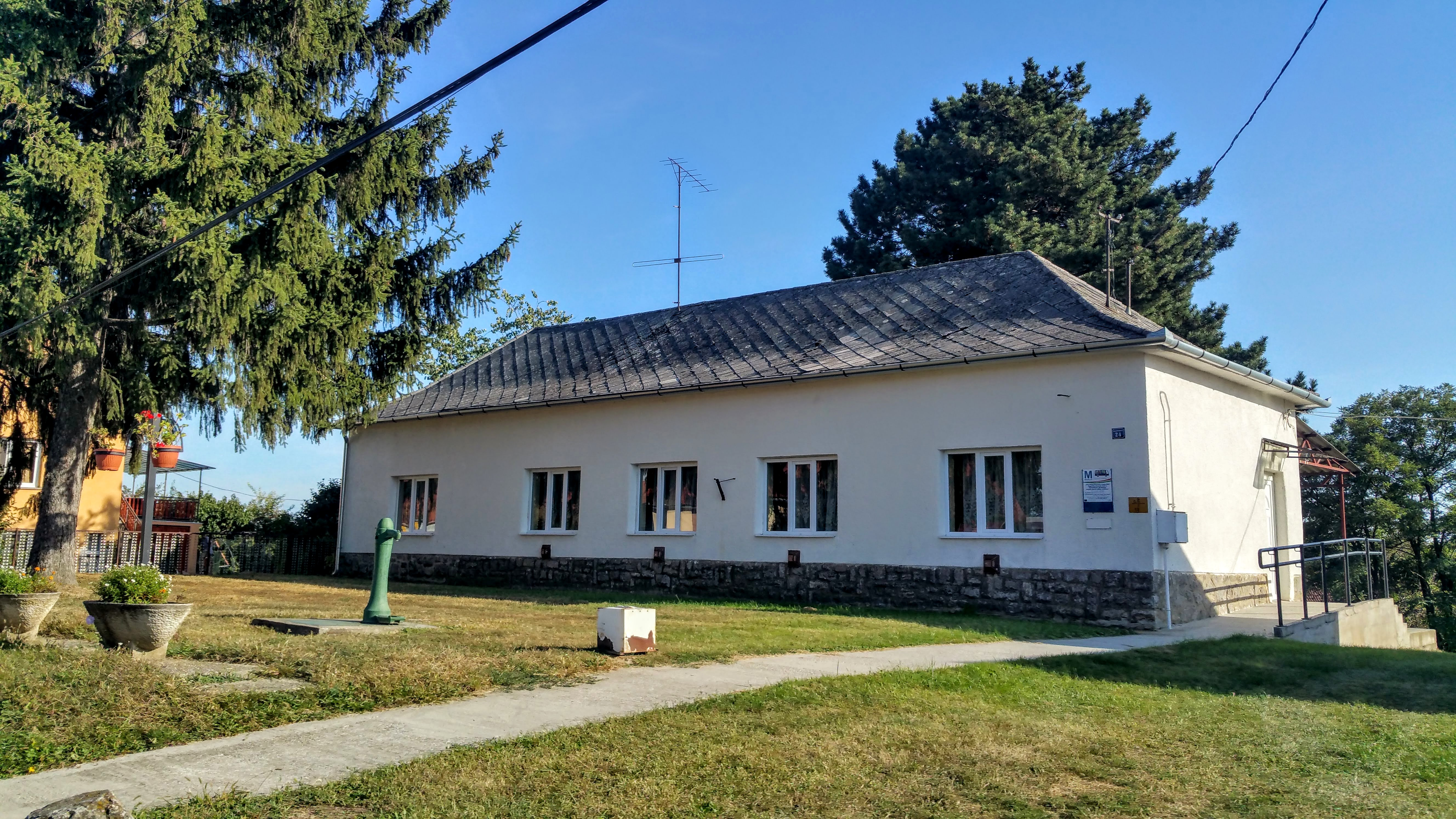

- Location of Baranya county in Hungary

- Location of Szemely
- Coordinates: 46.00895°N 18.3272°E
- Country: Hungary
- County: Baranya

Area
  - Total: 9.47 km^{2} (3.66 sq mi)

Population (2004)
  - Total: 442
  - Density: 46.67/km^{2} (120.9/sq mi)
- Time zone: UTC+1 (CET)
  - Summer (DST): UTC+2 (CEST)
- Postal code: 7763
- Area code: 72

Szemely is a village in Baranya county, Hungary. It is south-east of the city of Pécs and the town of Kozármisleny.
