= Tango (play) =

Play by Sławomir Mrożek

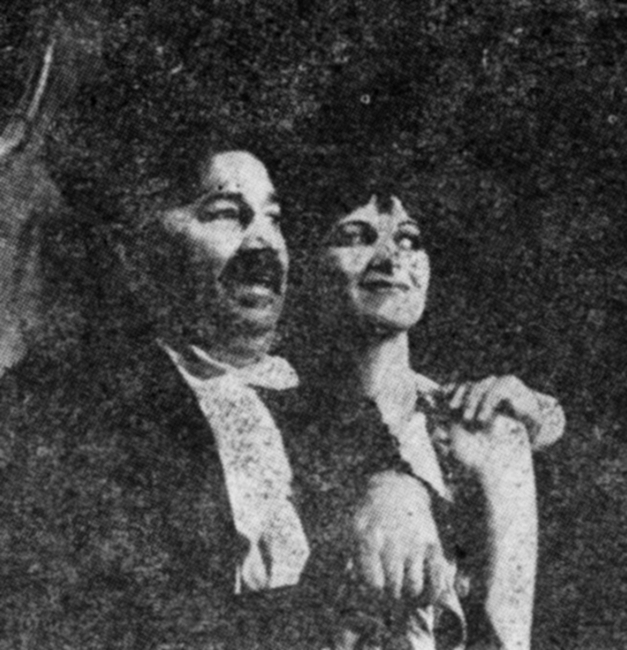
- Julia Bereczky (Eugenia) and György Barkó (Eugeniusz) in a 1985 staging (directed by Gábor Tompa at the Hungarian Theatre of Cluj)
- Original language: Polish
- Written by: Sławomir Mrożek
- Characters: Artur; Ala; Edek; Eugeniusz; Eugenia; Eleonora; Stomil
- Genre: drama

Premiere
- Date: 21 April 1965
- Place: Bydgoszcz, Poland

Tango is a drama written by Polish writer, dramatist and cartoonist Sławomir Mrożek (1930–2013). It is the playwright's longest work, and was first published in the literary magazine Dialog (Dialogue) in 1964. In Poland, Tango was staged for the first time in Bydgoszcz in 1965. The drama has been translated into English, Italian, Japanese, French, Danish, Hebrew, Czech, Greek, Slovenian, Dutch, Estonian, German, Spanish and other languages.

== Plot ==
The play is set in a non-defined time in the home of Stomil and Eleonora, parents of Artur (student of medicine). The home is disorganized, not only because of the way it is furnished, but also through the complete lack of house rules and common values; everyone can do whatever they want. In addition, many unneeded objects like a baby carriage, an old wedding dress, and a catafalque after Artur grandfather's death, can be found in there. It seems that "perplexity" may be the word that describes their lives best. Despite Artur’s attempts being bound to fail, he tries to make rules and grant some things meaning. Artur tries to coax his grandmother to use the catafalque, revolts against his father's slovenliness and his mother’s double standards of morality. He himself wants to have a traditional wedding, however he fails. Artur, while organizing the reception, forgets to declare his feelings toward his fiancée, causing her to think he’s indifferent to her and, in consequence, she claims to have an affair with Edek. Furthermore, his grandmother dies, and Artur is killed by Edek. The drama ends with a tango dance, symbolizing simplicity, primitivism, and mass culture; meaning those "values" won. Edek announces that he is taking control over the home and that everyone must listen to him and follow his rules from now on.

== Themes ==
"Tango" tells the story about generation gap in contemporary society and how conformity, anarchy, entropy and formalism come into conflict between generations. It tries to focus on finding the answer whether there is any space for an intellectual in such community.

== Characters ==
- Artur – Stomil and Eleonora’s son
- Ala – Artur’s cousin and fiancée
- Edek – "a man with a moustache", Eleonora’s lover, regular visitor to Stomil family house
- Eugeniusz – Artur’s uncle and Eugenia’s brother
- Eugenia – Artur’s grandmother
- Eleonora – Artur’s mother
- Stomil – Artur’s father

== See also ==
- Theatre of Poland
