= Zobak coal mine =

Coal mine in Zobák, Baranya County, Hungary

Coordinates: 46.189815604264666°N 18.289101873252065°E

Zobak Coal Mine
- Interactive map of Zobak Coal Mine
- Location: Baranya County, Hungary
- Products: Lignite

The Zobak Coal Mine is an abandoned coal mine located north of the city of Pécs, Baranya County, Hungary. The mine had coal reserves amounting to 199 million tonnes of lignite, one of the largest coal reserves in Europe and the world and had an annual production of 300,000 tonnes of coal. It was closed on 31. of January 2000, and has since been unused by its current owner.
