= Bulcsú Hoppál =

Hungarian theologian and philosopher

Bulcsú Kál Hoppál (born 24 September 1974) is a Hungarian theologian and philosopher.

== Biography ==
In 1999 he received a Bachelor's degree in Sacred Theology at Pázmány Péter Katolikus Egyetem in Budapest. In 2002 he received a Licentiate there in the same subject—the equivalent of a Ph.D. In 2003, he received the degree of Magister der Philosophie from the International Academy for Philosophy in the Principality of Liechtenstein. He is one of the vice-presidents of the Hungarian Association for the Academic Study of Religion.

== Publications ==
=== Books ===
Hoppál has written or edited several books, mostly on the subject of Saint Thomas Aquinas; most of them have been published by France-based international academic publisher L'Harmattan.

- Hoppál, Bulcsú Kál, ed. (2006). Hittel a nemzetért. Hívők helytállása az 1956-os forradalomban és szabadságharcban [Faith in the nation. Believers in the Steadfastness of the 1956 Revolution and Fight for Freedom] (in Hungarian). Budapest: Patrióta Média.
- Cselényi, István; Hoppál, Bulcsú Kál; Kormos, József, eds. (2007). Aquinói Szent Tamás nyomán. A Magyarországi Aquinói Szent Tamás Társaság konferenciái 2004-2005 [Following St. Thomas Aquinas. The St. Thomas Aquinas Society conferences held in Hungary 2004-2005] (in Hungarian). Budapest: Mozaik Nyomda.
- Hoppál, Bulcsú Kál, ed. (2007). Előadások a vallásról [Lectures on religion] (PDF). Vallástudományi Tanulmányok 7-8 [Religious Studies 7-8] (in Hungarian). Budapest: Mozaik Nyomda. Archived from the original (PDF) on 2012-04-26.
- Cselényi, István; Hoppál, Bulcsú Kál; Kormos, József, eds. (2009). Aquinói Szent Tamás párbeszéde korunkkal [St. Thomas Aquinas dialogue] (in Hungarian). Mozaik Nyomda.
- Hoppál, Bulcsú Kál, ed. (2010). Aquinói Tamás és a tomizmus ma. Thomas Aquinas and Thomism Today (in Hungarian). Budapest: L’Harmattan. ISBN 978-963-236-285-4.
- Cselényi, István; Hoppál, Kál Bulcsú, eds. (2011). A Magyarországi Aquinói Szent Tamás Társaság Közleményei [The St. Thomas Aquinas Society Publications of Hungary] (in Hungarian). Budapest: Mozaik Nyomda.
- Hoppál, Bulcsú Kál; Szilágyi, Zsolt; Vassányi, Miklós, eds. (2011). Áldozat és ima [Sacrifice and Prayer] (in Hungarian). Budapest: L’Harmattan.

=== Other publications ===
- Hoppál, Bulcsú Kál (2009). "Mi köze a filozófiának a vallástudományhoz? Egy vallástudományi kísérlet Pauler Ákos bölcselete alapján". In Hoppál, Mihály; Kovács, Ábrahám (eds.). Tanulmányok a magyar vallástudomány történetéről [Studies in the History of Hungarian Theology] (in Hungarian). Budapest: L’Harmattan. pp. 19–27.
- Hoppál, Bulcsú Kál (2010). "Rendszerbe zárva – a magyar katolikus teológia helyzete a hetvenes években Nyíri Tamás munkásságának szempontjából [Closed System - the Situation of the Hungarian Catholic Theology of the Seventies in the work of Tamás Nyíri]". In Boros, Gábor (ed.). A hetvenes évek filozófiai lehetőségei és valósága [The Philosophical Possibilities and Realities of the Seventies] (in Hungarian). Budapest: L’Harmattan. pp. 187–202.
- Hoppál, Bulcsú Kál (2010). "Szerkezet nélküli kultúra [Structure without Culture]". Kapu (in Hungarian). XXIII (4): 23–25.
- Hoppál, Bulcsú Kál (2010). "Betekintés a mai vallástudományba [Insights into contemporary Theology]" (PDF). Vallástudományi Szemle (in Hungarian) (3): 213–215.
- Hoppál, Bulcsú Kál (2011). Hoppál, Mihály; Szabó, Péter S. (eds.). "The Minimum Phenomenology in Religious Studies" (PDF). Vallástudományi Szemle (Science of Religion in Hungary, special issue). Budapest: King Sigismund College and the Hungarian Association for the Academic Study of Religions: 62–69.

== Filmography ==
Hoppál is also a film-maker, and has been involved in the following productions:

- …s mondják neki, csángó… (with Péter Csabá Kocsis); director, 2005. Presented at: Magyarkanizsa, Cnesa Kulturális Központ (SCG)
- …visszafelé csak az Isten tudja… Gyón – 1956 (with Péter Csabá Kocsis); director, 2006. (supported by Hungarian Historical Film Foundation); MADE Festival 2006, winner.
- …jó volt, hogy volt… Magyarfalusi Napok 2006., co-director. Subregional and Small Community Television, IX. Film Festival in memory of Geza Radvanyi: winner; Folk art film festival, 2007; Rákóczifalva, 2007: 3rd place). With Péter Csabával Kocsis.
- Gáborok, experimental documentary, director. IV. National Independent Documentary History Review 2008: winner.
- Volt az a pár nap…, director. With support of Újbuda XI. kerületi Önkormányzat.
- Szadduceus (with Dániel Havasi), director, 2009. Faludi Akadémia "Csoda" Film Festival: winner.
- Tamási, 1956 (with Dániel Havasi and András K. Németh), director, 2010.
- Cigányok az 1956-os forradalomban [Gypsies of the 1956 Revolution]. (with Dániel Havasi), director and scenario, 2011.
