= Socialist Party of the autonomous region of Fünfkirchen =

Political party in the Fünfkirchen/Pécs region

The Socialist Party of the autonomous region of Fünfkirchen was a political party in the Fünfkirchen/Pécs region, during the Serbian occupation period after World War I. The party broke away from the Social Democratic Party of Hungary in 1920. The new party name was adopted on June 12, 1920. The party organ was the newspaper Munkás ('Worker'). The party was linked to exiled Hungarian socialists in Vienna, the group of Vilmos Böhm and Zsigmond Kunfi. Key leader of the party included Gyula Hajdu and Sándor Haraszti was a member of the party.

The party favoured keeping the region under Serbian protection until the regime of Miklós Horthy had been overthrown in Hungary. The Socialist Party won the local National Council elections held in August 1920. Béla Linder became the National Council chairman. In October 1920 The party declared it wanted to join the Communist International.

The party held its 1st congress in May 1921, with the inaugural session being held in the city hall on May 29, 1921. The congress approved a list of people nominated for leadership bodies, to be voted by party members on June 19, 1921;

- Members of the Party Committee: Ferenc Fekete, György Gasztner, László Haász, Ferenc Hoffmann, János Hock, József Kollmann, Imre Kovács, Erzsébet Kovács, Ernő Lefkovics, Gusztáv Marczin, József Mattenheim, József Orgovány, Árpolt Pázmányi, Ferenc Schneider, István Schejermann, János Tóth, János Udvardi, Sándor Weisz, Gyula Zelenka. (Alternate members: Sándor Avas, János Akkermann, József Gallai, Ferenc Gyenis, Sándor Jagados, Mihály Kübler)
- Party Supervisory Committee: Ferenc Bein, Sándor Doktor, György Imrő (Alternate members: Mátyás Ferics, József Horváth, András Zsifkovics)
- Party Executive: György Berki, Ferenc József, Ferenc Gyurákovics, Ádám Hahn, József Heim, Mihály Hoffmann, Péter Storcz, István Szabó, József Tóth, Mihály Tóth, Gyula Vörös.

The party sent three delegates to the 3rd World Congress of the Communist International. The delegation of the party included Richard Friedl and Gyula Hajdú.
