= Swabian Turkey =

Ethnically-German region of Hungary

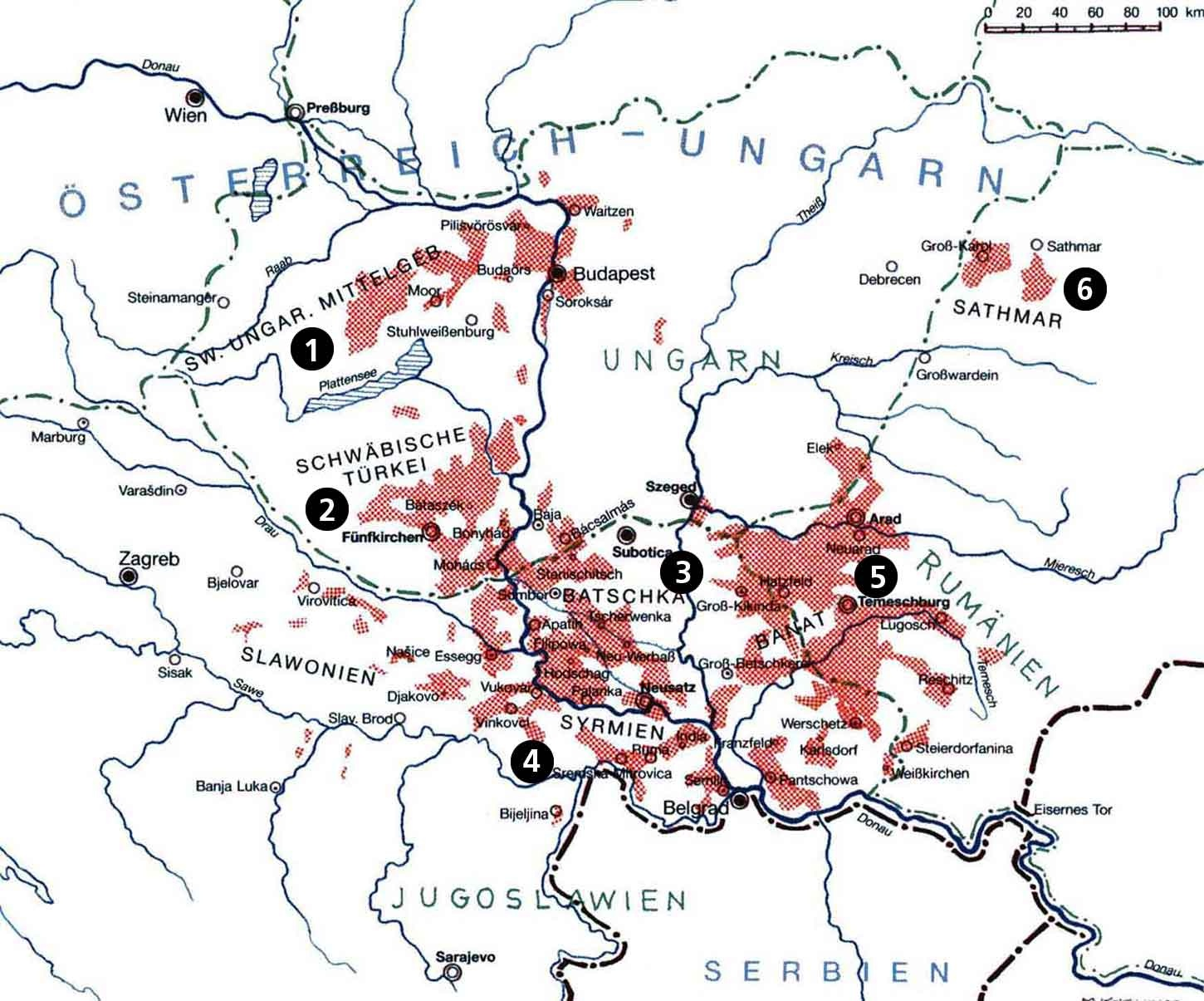
Map of the settlement areas of Swabian Turkey

Swabian Turkey (German: Schwäbische Türkei; Hungarian: Sváb-Törökország; Serbian: Švapska Turska) is a term describing a southwestern region of Hungary delimited by the Danube (Donau) and Drava (Drau) rivers, inhabited by the Germans of Hungary, an ethnic German minority. This modern-day minority, the largest German-speaking one in Hungary, primarily lives in the counties of Tolna (Tolnau), Baranya (Branau), and Somogy (Schomodei), and is the largest population of the Danube Swabians (Donauschwaben). Despite the name, virtually no ethnic Turks live in the region; rather, the name refers to the area being formerly "Turkish" (i.e. Ottoman) territory before being repopulated by Germans ("Swabians").

== Background ==
After the Ottoman Empire was defeated in the Second Battle of Mohács in 1687, the Habsburg monarchy forced the Ottoman Turks to leave the Kingdom of Hungary. Because much of the Pannonian Plain had been depopulated during the Ottoman wars in Europe, the Habsburgs began to resettle the land with Germans, especially from Swabia.

=== Settlement ===
German colonization in southeastern Transdanubia began in 1689. While many came from Swabia, the German settlers also came from the Rhenish Palatinate, Hesse, the Westerwald, Fulda (district), Mosel-Saar-Ruwer, Electorate of Trier, Electoral Palatinate, Bavaria, and throughout Franconia. Because of the many Swabian colonists from Upper Swabia, northern Lake Constance, upper Danube, Southern Black Forest and Principality of Fürstenberg settling on land previously controlled by the Turks, the region of Tolna, Somogy and Baranya counties became known as Swabian Turkey. The settlers were often induced to immigrate to Hungary with the promise of three years without taxes. The vast majority of German settlement was organized by private ventures run by the nobility or the Roman Catholic Church. Most of the German settlement was in pre-existing Slav- or Magyar-inhabited villages, but some new villages were also founded by Germans. The only two German-founded villages remaining in Swabian Turkey that were established by state ventures were Dunakömlőd (Kimling) and Németkér (Deutsch-Ker). Germans also settled extensively in the major towns of Pécs (Fünfkirchen) and Mohács (Mohatsch). Swabian Turkey is also referred to as Little Hesse, because many of the Germans settlers in the Baranya were from Hesse, especially from Fulda. Their descendants are called Stifolders.

== Post–World War II ==
During the expulsion of Germans after World War II, many Germans from Swabian Turkey were expelled from their homes and replaced with Hungarians evicted from Czechoslovakia; the remaining Germans were often persecuted by the communist government. After the Fall of Communism in 1989, the Danube Swabians received minority rights, organisations, schools, and local councils and maintained their own regional dialect of German. However, the Germans are gradually being assimilated.

== See also ==
- Danube Swabians
- Volksdeutsche
