= Pannon wine region =

- Wine region
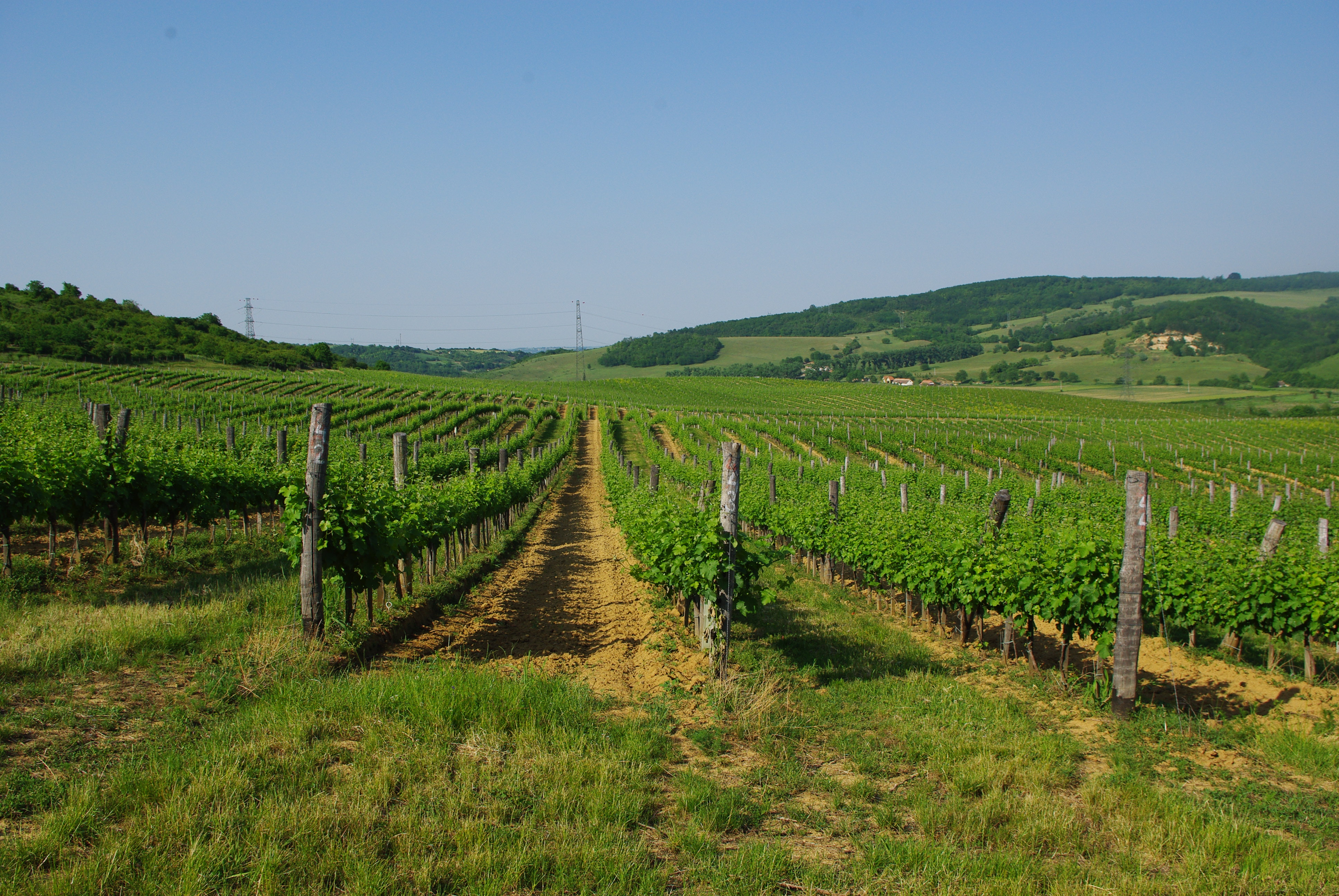
- Official name: Pannon borrégió
- Country: Hungary
- Sub-regions: Pécs, Szekszárd, Tolna, Villány
- Total area: 28822 ha
- Size of planted vineyards: 8902 ha
- Official designation(s): Szekszárdi Bikavér

Pannon wine region is one of the seven larger wine regions of Hungary. It consists of four wine regions: Pécs, Szekszárd, Tolna and Villány. Its soil is mostly loess. Wine production started in the Roman ages. Both red and white wines are produced, but the former are more significant. International varieties, especially Cabernet Sauvignon, Cabernet Franc and Merlot have gained ground in the region. The best known product of Szekszárd is Szekszárdi Bikavér, while Villány is known for its full-bodied Bordeaux style red wines.

== Wine regions ==
Wine region	Area		
Wine region	Total	1st class	Planted
Pécs wine region	7000	6416	823
Szekszárd wine region	6000	3789	2633
Tolna wine region	11300	7362	2900
Villány wine region	4522	2911	2546
