= Kozármisleny =

- Town
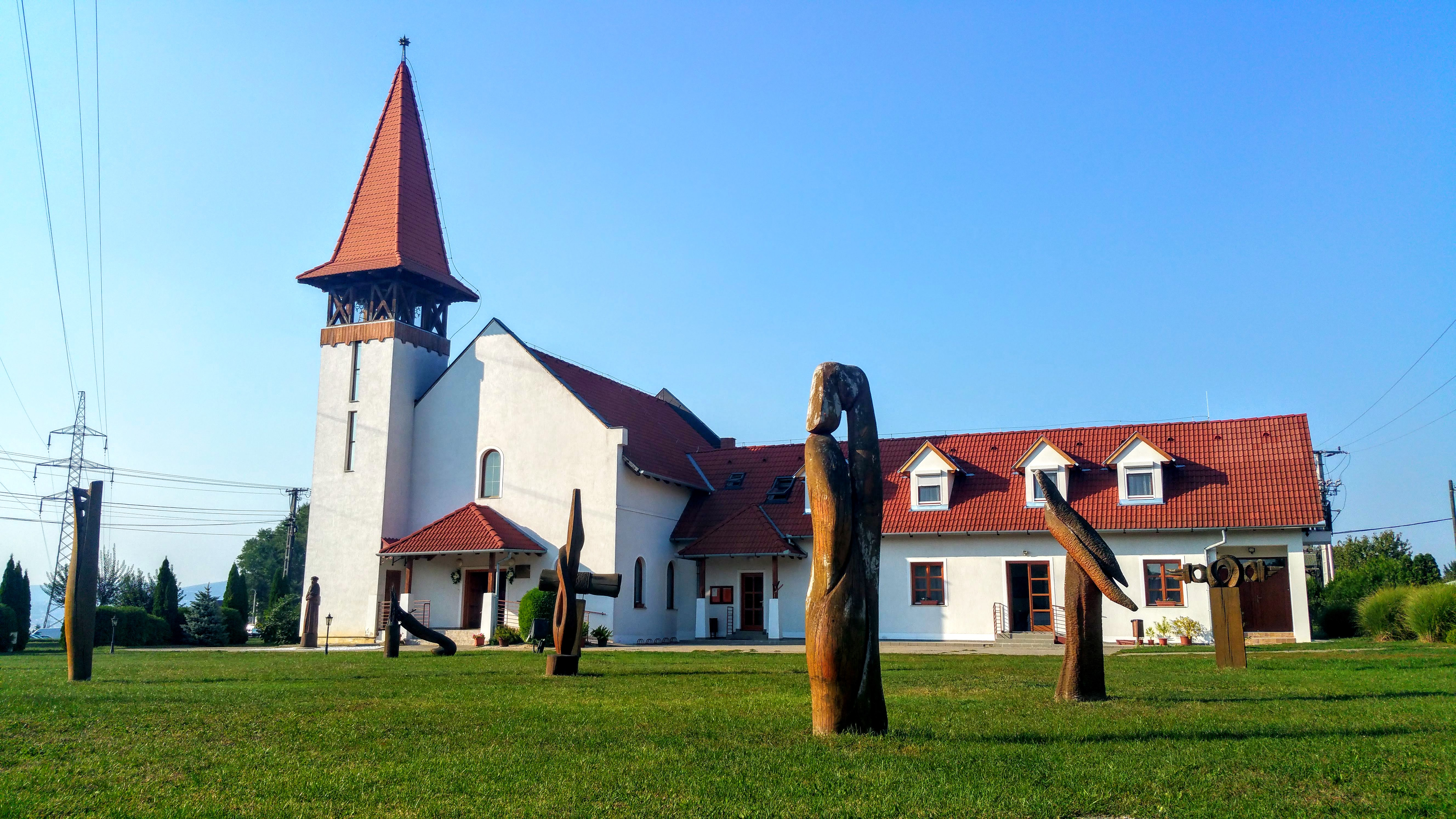
- Reformed church in Kozármisleny

- Flag Coat of arms

- Location of Kozármisleny
- Coordinates: 46.028°N 18.292°E
- Country: Hungary
- County: Baranya
- District: Pécs

Area
  - Total: 14.45 km^{2} (5.58 sq mi)

Population (2009)
  - Total: 5,802
  - Density: 392.35/km^{2} (1,016.2/sq mi)
- Time zone: UTC+1 (CET)
  - Summer (DST): UTC+2 (CEST)
- Postal code: 7761
- Area code: (+36) 72
- Website: www.kozarmisleny.hu

Kozármisleny (Croatian: Mišljen; German: Mischlen) is a town in Baranya County, southern Hungary. It is south-east of the city of Pécs.

== History ==
The history of Kozármisleny is rooted in the early Bronze Age, as indicated by archeological findings. Roman remains have also been found in the area. The transcontinental military road connecting Sremska Mitrovica-Pécs-Szombathely-Sopron led not far from the place. The Avars living here between the 6th and 9th centuries also left some relics behind. Several tombs have been found dating back to the time of the Hungarian conquest.

The village got its present form when two smaller settlements, Kiskozár and Misleny, were united in 1928. The name of Kozár was first mentioned in documents in 1332-1335, in the papal tithe registers, in the form Kosar. Misleny was first mentioned in a document dating back to 1266, as Myslen. The place played an important role in the development of Baranya County. Originally there were two areas, each governed by a castle built in their centers. One of them was Baranyavár, the other Koaszt with its center somewhere between Kozármisleny and Nagykozár. Baranya county developed out of these two areas.

Kiskozár was inhabited continuously, even under the Turkish rule. In the 17th and 18th centuries South Slav families settled next to the Hungarian population. Some of them got assimilated, others moved away after some time. Around 1760, German settlers came and by the middle of the last century they were in majority. Misleny was inhabited under the Turkish rule, and in the 17th and 18th centuries its population was partly Hungarian and partly Slav. After the war of independence (1703–1711), only the Hungarians remained.

== Present ==
Kozármisleny is currently going through a period of growth and development of infrastructure. The town has restaurants, pension lodgings, two confectioneries, two bakeries and SPAR shops, two pharmacies, as well as dentists and adult and children doctor's offices. The population has also grown. In the 1970s there were 2000 people living in Kozármisleny, now the population is 5579. The President of the Republic of Hungary declared it a town on 1 July 2007, becoming the 13th town of Baranya County.

The town has a community centre. The Janikovszky Éva General Community Center came into existence with the unifying of the nursery, the kindergarten, the primary school, and the library.

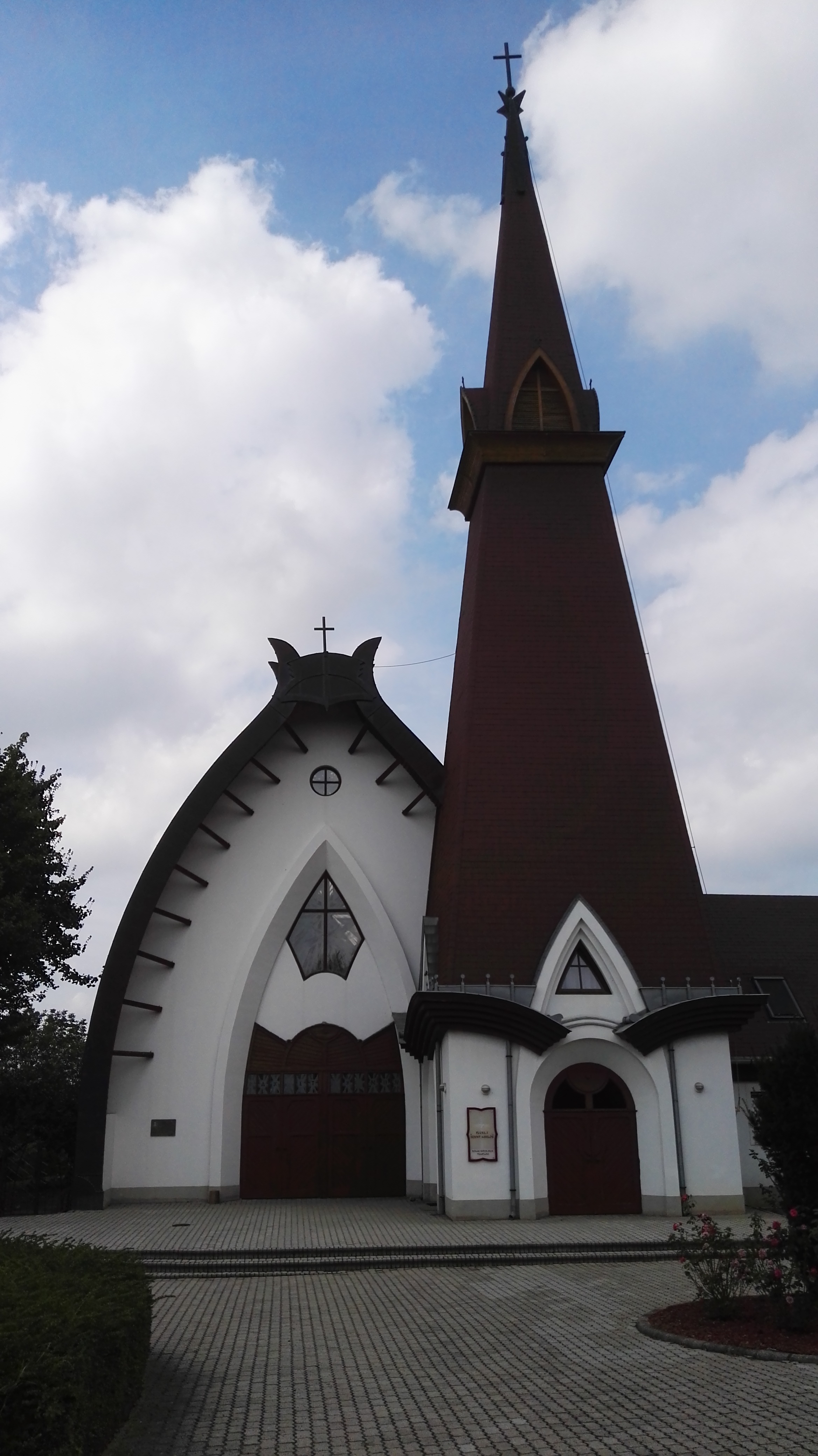
Nicholas of Flüe Church

In the town there are two Catholic churches and a Reformed church. The original Roman Catholic church of the village was consecrated in 1971. Inside this church is a statue of St Margaret of Scotland. The second Roman Catholic church, built as a part of the convent, belongs to the St Francis of Assisi Sick Nurses. Its construction began in 1993 and was consecrated on 31 March 1997, to Nicholas of Flüe (Brother Klaus, patron saint of Switzerland). The designs were made by Ottó Vince, an architect living in Pécs.

Several local associations and civil organizations work in Kozármisleny. These are active in organizing the town's feasts, competitions and folk dance meetings.

The town celebrates its day on 6 September. Awards are given on this day.

East of Kozármisleny, there is a medium wave broadcasting station working on 873 kHz with 20 kW using a 133 metres high guyed mast radiator as antenna.

== Demographics ==
As of 2022, the town was 90.2% Hungarian, 4.6% German, 1.9% Croatian, and 3.7% of non-European origin. The population was 32.5% Roman Catholic, 5.7% Reformed, 1.5% Lutheran, and 18.0% nondenominational.

== Twin towns – sister cities ==
Kozármisleny is twinned with:

- Kopačevo (Bilje), Croatia
- Ocna Mureș, Romania
- Orimattila, Finland
- Pag, Croatia
- Sezze, Italy
- Várda, Hungary

== Sport ==
Kozármisleny has a sports hall, an indoor football field with artificial grass, fish pond, fitness centre, and riding school.

The town's football club is Kozármisleny SE, which is currently in the second tier of Hungarian football, NB2. The town is also involved in rhythmic gymnastics, basketball, handball and table tennis.
