= Péter Hoppál =

Hungarian politician

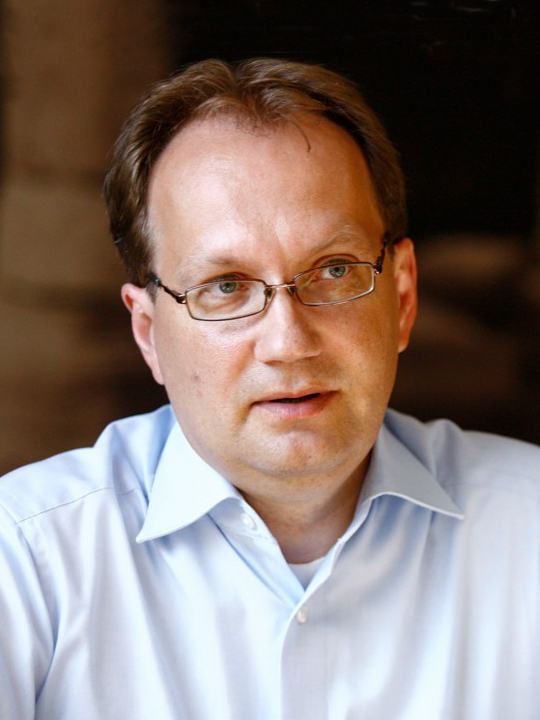

Secretary of State for Culture of the Ministry of Human Resources
- In office 15 June 2014 – 17 May 2018
- Minister: Zoltán Balog
- Preceded by: János Halász
- Succeeded by: Péter Fekete

Member of the National Assembly
- In office 30 March 2009 – 8 May 2026

Personal details
- Born: 1972 (age 53–54) Budapest, Hungary
- Spouse: Dr Judit Hoppálné Erdő
- Children: Hunor; Botond; Anilla
- Profession: politician

Péter Hoppál (born 1972) is a Hungarian politician, who was a member of the National Assembly (MP) for Pécs (Baranya County Constituency I then II) from 2010 to 2026. He was also a Member of Parliament from the Fidesz Baranya County Regional List between 2009 and 2010. He served as Secretary of State for Culture from 15 June 2014 to 17 May 2018.

== Career ==
He served as General Director of the Calvinist College in Pécs between 2002 and 2010. He also taught in the University of Pécs from 2001 to 2009.

Hoppál became a member of the Pécs General assembly in 2006 where he participated in the running of programs of European Capital of Culture as a member of the Committee on Culture. He was appointed deputy group leader of Fidesz in 2008. He was elected to the National Assembly on 30 March 2009 from Baranya County Regional List in the place of Pál Aszódi who died on 27 February 2009. He became a member of the Committee on Youth, Social and Family Affairs.

During the parliamentary election in 2010, he was elected MP for Pécs in the first round. He is a member of the Committee on Education, Science and Research since 14 May 2010 and of the Committee of National Cohesion since 1 January 2011. And he was also member of the Hungarian Parliamentary Delegation of the Council of Europe (Strasbourg). Hoppál became a member of the Pécs General assembly in 2010 as Head of the Committee on Education and Culture. After losing his seat in the Parliament, he retired from national politics.

== Personal life ==
He is married. His wife is Judit Hoppálné Erdő. They have a daughter and two sons.
