= A Stormy Night =

1878 play by Ion Luca Caragiale

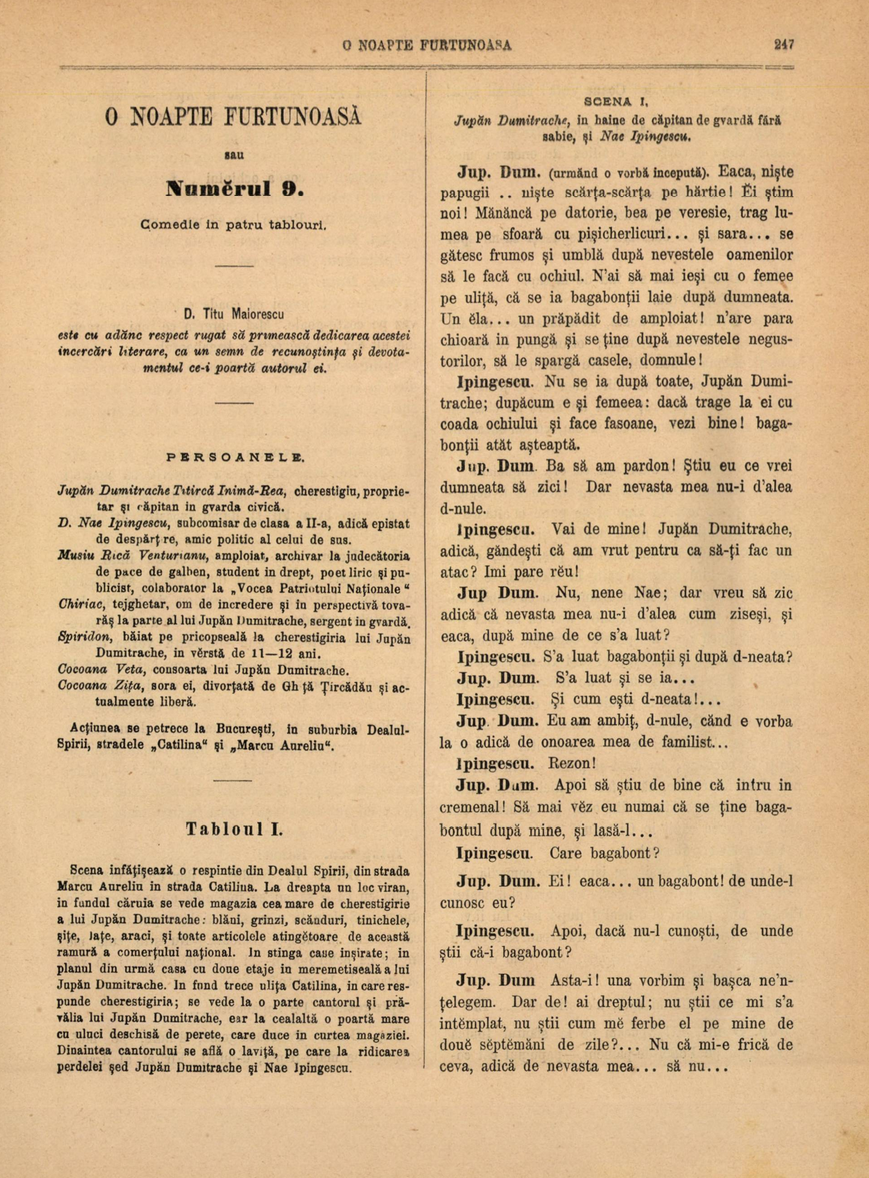
- First page of the play as published in Convorbiri Literare, October 1879
- Original title: O noapte furtunoasă sau Numĕrul 9
- Original language: Romanian
- Written by: Ion Luca Caragiale
- Characters: Dumitrache Titircă; Nae Ipingescu; Chiriac (Sotirescu); Spiridon; Veta (Titircă); Zița (Țârcădău); Andrei "Rică" Venturiano
- Genre: Farce; Sex comedy; Political satire
- Setting: Dealul Spirii, Bucharest, c. 1877

Premiere
- Date: 18 January 1879
- Place: National Theater Bucharest

A Stormy Night (Romanian: O noapte furtunoasă, originally O noapte furtunoasă sau Numĕrul 9) is an 1878 comedy play by Ion Luca Caragiale, and widely seen as a major accomplishment in modern Romanian humor. It was Caragiale's debut as a dramatist, at age 26, after a period of writing for various newspapers—the same age and profession as those associated with the play's protagonist, Rică Venturiano. The work combines elements of farce, sex comedy, and political satire, being a public gesture whereby Caragiale emphasized his break with Romanian liberalism, which was at the time dominant in local political culture. Set in Dealul Spirii neighborhood (mahala), south-central Bucharest, A Stormy Night focuses on the nighttime intrusion of Venturiano, a liberal demagogue employed as a government clerk, into the townhouse of Dumitrache Titircă, embodying the more commercially successful layers of the liberal-voting petty bourgeoisie. Titircă's home is revealed to be the scene of an adulterous affair between his wife, Veta, and his assistant, Chiriac—though Caragiale scholars remain divided as to whether Dumitrache is entirely oblivious or a willing cuckold.

The play is rich with symbolism and comedy of language, aligned with the aesthetic values promoted by Junimea literary society and its conservative counterculture. Through Venturiano's lines, the author parodies republicanism and Romantic nationalism, while also taking on, and rendering ridicule, the Latinate spelling norms favored by extreme liberals; through Titircă and his henchmen, he settles scores with the Civic Guard, which he had come to see as a parasitical institution of the liberals' spoils system; through Veta and her sister Zița, he mocks the romantic-themed daydreaming and kitsch aspirations of middle-class housewives. A Stormy Night was first performed at the National Theater Bucharest, in January 1879, becoming extremely successful on its premiere. The original text, used for that production, had four acts; it was later shortened and modified by Caragiale (who probably maintained some of the changes operated, without his consent, by manager Ion Ghica).

Both the original version and the definitive text were topics of enduring controversy, which began violently, on the play's second performance, when the Civic Guard sought Caragiale to have him beaten up; more lenient liberals preferred to ignore it as a harmless farce, while others, though commending Caragiale for his talent, expressed the view that his social critique was exaggerated, unfair, or untimely. The play charmed conservative opinion-makers, including Titu Maiorescu and Mihai Eminescu, and was later also upheld as a masterpiece by the Marxist school of criticism. A Stormy Night remained a staple of Romanian theater, with productions overseen by Caragiale down to his death in 1912; at the time, he was working on a sequel that also mixed in characters from his other major comedy, O scrisoare pierdută, and broadened the scope by also attacking conservatives. His posterity saw a split between "sociological" (and generally Marxist) productions of the play, as recommended by Sică Alexandrescu, and experimental versions by Alexa Visarion, Sorana Coroamă-Stanca, and Mihai Măniuțiu; both visions are occasionally opposed by "innocent" readings of the text, which emphasize the farcical elements.

A Stormy Night inspired a 1930s opéra bouffe by Paul Constantinescu, a 1942 film by Jean Georgescu, and various fragments of prose by Camil Petrescu. The play is heavily reliant on language humor, and as such notoriously difficult to translate—adaptations such as the French one, penned in the 1950s by Eugène Ionesco, include a large dose of lexical inventiveness. The Romanian communist regime encouraged publications and productions of the play throughout the Eastern Bloc and the developing world, where it has acquired a cult following. It was repeatedly used for stagings in Hungarian, done either in Hungary or among the Hungarian Romanian community—it was directed on two occasions by Gábor Tompa, who adopted a median position between experimentalism and the "innocent" repertoire.

== Setting ==
A Stormy Night was completed during the transition from the Principality of Romania, still a tributary state of the Ottoman Empire, to an independent and consolidated kingdom. As noted by cultural sociologist Zigu Ornea, this moment marked the "introduction of modern civilization", in which "the antinomy between the new forms and the multi-secular content was an inescapable reality." In this context, Romanian liberalism, centered on the National Liberal Party, had portrayed itself as both the modernizing and the authentically nationalist camp, while also reserving the option to discard the monarchy and establish a republic—this "demagoguery" was meant to both serve and conceal a spoils system, one which Caragiale had witnessed first-hand as a young liberal affiliate, and which had come to deeply resent. As editor of Timpul, which sought to generate a backlash against liberal domination, Caragiale had already complained that the conservative, declining, boyardom was pe dric ("on the hearse").

Caragiale's "conservative Weltanshauung", only occasionally juxtaposed over party politics, had been informed by Titu Maiorescu and the Junimea society: the Juminist critique of liberalism was, from its inception, centered on exposing the liberals' detrimental influence on the cultural sphere, and in particular on the written and spoken language. Other than taking up this attack on liberal culture, A Stormy Night focuses mainly on the Civic Guard, an urban paramilitary formation that had been established in March 1866—its stated purpose was "to represent at the highest level the nation, the civilian population in its entirety, irrespective of its social standing and wealth, hereby called under arms and ever-ready to defend its country." Originally favored by conservatives such as Dimitrie Ghica, it was thereafter monopolized by the radical-liberal bourgeoisie. In his liberal phase, Caragiale had served in a Guard unit in Bucharest's Armenian Quarter—in one of his humorous memoirs, he recalls having paraded alongside baristas (cafegii), one of whom still wore an apron underneath his coat. During the Romanian war of independence (1877–1878), both he and Maiorescu resisted pressures to show up for training as Guardists; Caragiale opted to give "repeated monetary contributions" in lieu of service. As noted by Caragiale's associate Iacob Negruzzi, the Guard was rendered laughable during the war, when the regular Land Forces had displayed bravery on faraway battlefields.

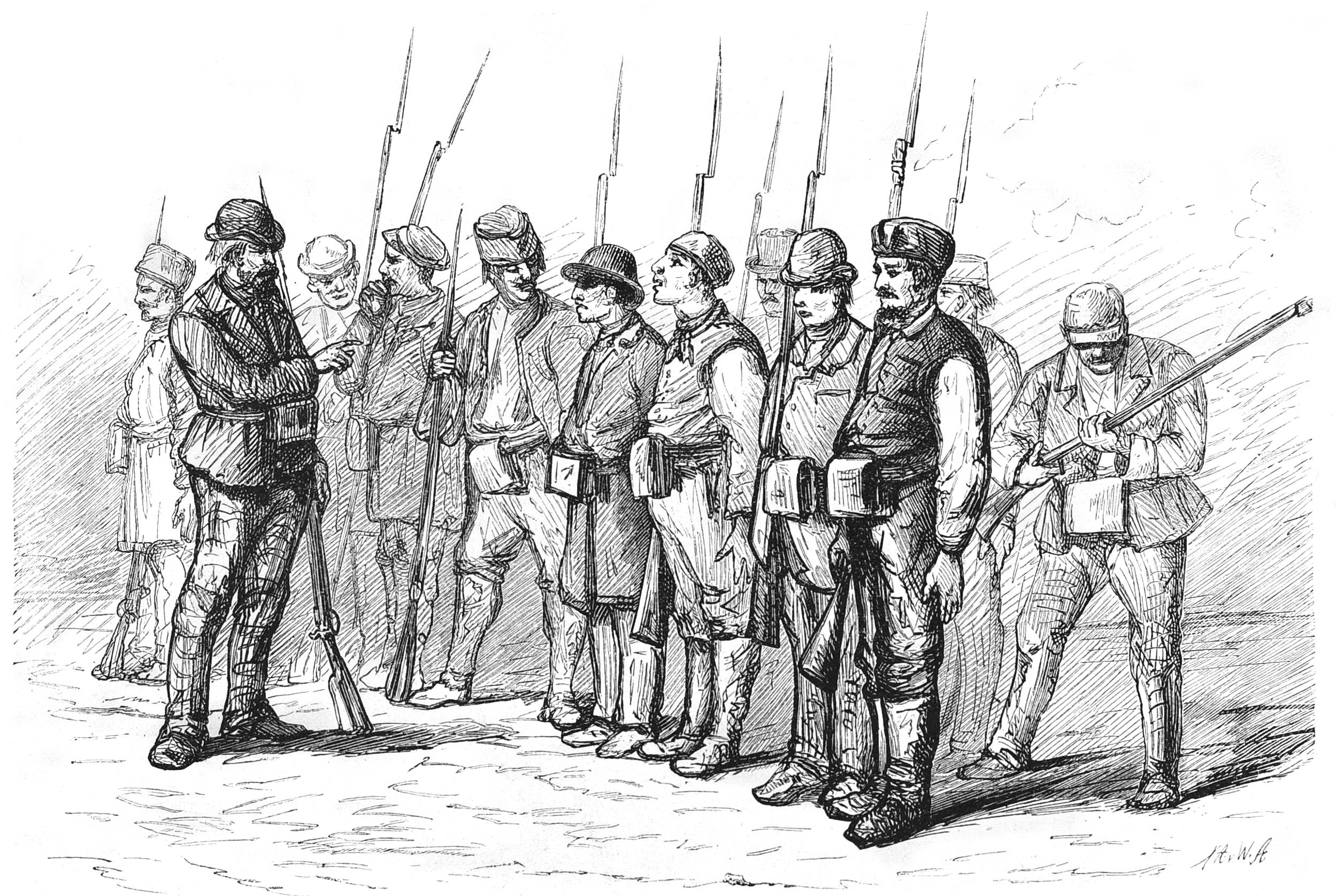
Recruits of the Civic Guard, as pictured in 1877 by Nikolay Karazin

The play is set in an unspecified mahala (lower-middle-class neighborhood) of Bucharest; its text includes repeated references to shows at "Union" (also bastardized as Iunion), which is in fact actor I. D. Ionescu's beer garden, the Union-Suisse. Dramatist Ion Marin Sadoveanu, dismissing claims that Caragiale was vague in describing nature, suggests that fragments of dialogue help to precisely locate the mahala on an identifiable portion of Dealul Spirii, in the vicinity of a limepit. Museologist Ionel Ioniță argues the same, noting that the Iunion can be reliably located on Calea Victoriei, just north of the present-day Telephones Company Building, whereas the house in which the action takes place is most closely traced to the portion where Izvor Street led into Dealul Spirii. Ioniță argues that this location was chosen to conceal real-life events which inspired Caragiale. According to research carried out in the 1950s by N. Vătămanu, these took place at No 26 Șerban Vodă Highway (on Dealul Mitropoliei).

The text contains some unusual geographic detail, combining fiction and reality—for instance, the house is located on a street named after Catiline. While no such street existed, Dealul Spirii was known for its abundance of landmarks named after other figures in the history of Ancient Rome. Literary historian Iulian Boldea, building on earlier observations made by theatrologist Maria Vodă Căpușan, proposes that the Bucharest which emerges from the various verbal clues is a "crooked City" and "labyrinthic space", as dictated by both the needs of the plot and by Caragiale's own infatuation with the "mingle-mangle" (talmeș-balmeș) of the universe. One cryptic portion of the text lets spectators know that the location is within hearing distance of orologiul de la Stabiliment ("the clock tower at The Establishment"), which mysteriously sounds off at "20 past 11". According to sociologist Monica Săvulescu, this detail highlights Caragiale's annoyance with haphazardness and "lack of purpose", which he saw as characteristic traits in Romanian culture. "The Establishment" designated an arsenal which was located in the perimeter now occupied by a much larger Palace of the Parliament.

The events of the play can be tentatively dated, based on the fact that the Iunion had opened for the public in early 1876. Clues in the text indicate that they also take place shortly after lăsata secului ("the eve of abstinence"), which is usually taken to mean "Shrove Tuesday", in February; this is apparently contradicted immediately after by the date of the newspaper editorial, which has 15/27 răpciune—the Old Style and New Style dates for 15/27 September, but using the month's name in the superseded Romanian calendar. Scholars are in disagreement over what to make of the anomaly. Literary critic Florin Manolescu argues that Caragiale took no interest in the date being accurate, and simply used răpciune as an inherently funny word. Essayist and theologian Nicolae Steinhardt opposed this interpretation, proposing instead that lăsata secului refers in this context to 30 August, the last day before another period of fasting—non-canonical in Romanian Orthodoxy, which is the protagonists' religion, but embraced by many Orthodox under the influence of Transylvanian Greek Catholics.

== Plot ==
=== Act I ===
Scene I takes place in a ground-floor room, revealed to be part of a house inhabited by Jupân Dumitrache Titircă, nicknamed Inimă-Rea ("The Bad Heart"), who is the owner of a lumber yard and a Captain in the Civic Guard; a guardsman's rifle and bayonet hang in the background. The play opens in mid-dialogue, with a discussion between Dumitrache and his younger subordinate Nae Ipingescu, who serves as an ipistat—a corruption of the Greek "epistates" and the proper Romanian epistat, it designates the lowest rank among peacekeeping officers. The Captain angrily recounts that a "vagabond" has apparently been stalking his family—comprising himself, his wife Veta, and his sister-in-law Zița, while they were out celebrating lăsata secului at "Iunion". He believes that the strange young man, whom he describes using a number of class-based insults (since "he didn't look like no merchant"), was trying to seduce Veta, and notes that they could not lose him as they tried to make their way back home after the show. The episode, as recounted by Dumitrache, ended only because a pack of stray dogs cut off the stranger's path; Titircă attempted to return to the scene with his acolyte and shop assistant, Chiriac, whom he entrusts with defending "my honor as a family man", but the stalker "was no more".

Scene II introduces Chiriac: as a Sergent of the Guard, he discusses recruitment business with Dumitrache, and, during the exchange, mentions Zița's troubles with her ex-husband, Ghiță Țârcădău; he is also casually curious about Dumitrache's activities as a night guard, and about whether they would be over by "two after 12". Scene III introduces the boy servant Spiridon, who brings in the newspaper and is then sent to fetch Dumitrache's sword and belt from Veta's room; upon his return, he reveals that Veta is busy sewing Chiriac's uniform. Addressing Spiridon, the Captain expresses admiration for Chiriac's scrupulousness in making sure that Guard regulations are strictly carried out, including when it comes to the night shift, and proposes that the Sergeant should receive a decoration.

In Scene IV, Ipingescu returns to read Dumitrache from the newspaper, called Vocea Patriotului Naționale ("Voice of the National Patriot"). They are both impressed by its "combative" and democratic-republican message, though they struggle with the author's unfamiliar language; Ipingescu manages to read aloud the pseudonymous signature, R. Vent, before he is interrupted by sounds of a quarrel between Zița and an unseen male figure (Țârcădău). She calls out for Dumitrache's assistance, and they both rush out to her side, sounding off their regulation whistles. Scene V comprises Spiridon soliloquy, revealing that Titircă is mean to his staff, and has threatened the boy with a beating. In Scene VI, he is joined by a flustered Zița. Their dialogue reveals that Spiridon had acted as her courier between her and an unnamed suitor, who agreed to visit her in her house during Dumitrache's night-guard duties; he had asked Spiridon for the house number, and had handed him a love letter for Zița, which she reads aloud. It uses the same difficult language employed by "R. Vent".

Veta appears in Scene VII, alongside Zița and Spiridon—she agrees to let Spiridon leave to Zița's home and fetch her a coat (as he leaves, he exchanges secretive glances with Zița). Zița recounts her meeting with an increasingly violent Țârcădău, but Veta is absent-minded and appears to have been crying. Spiridon briefly enters, whispering to Zița that he could not locate her suitor (his true mission); Zița then prepares to bid farewell to her sister, who jadedly replies. When Zița asks that they should return for another show at "Iunion", she snaps back that she has no intention of ever returning there, which makes Zița burst out in tears. In Scene VIII, Veta, alone with Spiridon, inquires about Chiriac, learning that he too appears despondent. As Spiridon leaves, she goes into a soliloquy, revealing that she regards her love for Chiriac as unrequited. Chiriac enters, in Scene IX, and engages her in a heated argument, revealing that he is jealous of the strange man showing up at "Iunion". He believes that Veta has a secret lover—despite her assurances to the contrary. He threatens to kill himself with the bayonet, but Veta finally persuades him of her love; as they embrace, Dumitrache, who has begun his night shift, calls out Chiriac's name from outside. Chiriac rushes to the window to greet his boss, reassuring him that he will be on the lookout for the suspect; he promises to defend Titircă's "honor as a family man".

=== Act II ===
Scene I of Act II shows Chiriac parting with Veta, over fears that Dumitrache may decide to end his patrolling earlier than scheduled. In Scene II, Veta's singing and daydreaming are interrupted by Rică Venturiano, the "Iunion" stalker and Zița's suitor, who has secretly entered the home; Rică seemingly believes that Veta is the woman he has been corresponding with, and jumps to his knees, declaring his affection. Veta is shocked and threatens to shout for help, but stops when he pleads her not to, then slowly pieces together the facts. To Venturiano's irritation, she bursts out laughing. She then advises him that he should leave, informing him that Chiriac has orders to lynch him. Venturiano, now agitated, reassures her that he is an honorable man of good intentions, and introduces himself, spelling out his employment as an archival clerk, his youthful age (he is 25 going on 26), his ongoing education at the University of Bucharest Faculty of Law, as well as his other profession—he is a "publicist" for Vocea Patriotului Naționale. Dumitrache is then heard about to enter the room; Veta fears that he might believe she is cuckolding him (with Rică), and helps the intruder escape through the window, across the scaffolding.

In Scene III, Dumitrache and Ipingescu report that they have caught glimpse of a man going out the window. The Jupân, armed with a bare sword, confronts his wife, who is defiant; she laughs off his threats, including when he informs her that, upon gathering evidence of her infidelity, he might turn violent, "even if that'll get me jailed". In Scene IV, Veta has left, and Dumitrache demands that the rudely awakened Spiridon fetch Chiriac for him. Over Scene V, Chiriac, arriving in his nightgown, is interested to hear Dumitrache's story about a man having visited Veta, and promises to assist in the manhunt. Their conversation reveals that Rică may be trapped in the backyard, with the scaffolding leading nowhere. In Scene VI, Veta reenters the room just as Chiriac, now armed with his rifle, plans to climb down the scaffolding himself—she protests against this, and jumps in front of the window, informing the men that the scaffolding may be shoddy. He manages to flee her embrace and exists over the sill. As Zița reenters the room in Scene VII, she is confronted by her sister, who blames her for having caused her "trouble with Chiriac"; the statement puzzles Zița, but is quickly retracted by Veta. The commotion outside suggests that the three-man team has spotted Venturiano, which causes Zița much distress.

In Scene VIII, Venturiano, covered in lime, cement, and brick dust, makes his way back in through the window. His soliloquy reveals that he knows there is no way out through the back, and that he has only been escaping his "enemies" by hiding for hours in a barrel of cement. He tries to flee the room in panic upon hearing footsteps, but bumps into Spiridon. The latter is sympathetic to his plight, and offers to help him out of the house in exchange for a baksheesh. The plan is to get Dumitrache and his acolytes together on the top floor, while Rică waits out in the main room, and then to let him out through Spiridon's adjacent room. Scene IX shows the plan falling apart: as Spiridon exists, counting his money, Titircă, Ipingescu and Chiriac chance upon Rică. They prepare violent retribution, but Zița, despondent, and Veta, levelheaded, intervene to assure them that they have it wrong. Their plea finds backing from Ipingescu, who recognizes the intruder as "R. Vent". This changes the mood, and the men, one by one, come to see Venturiano as worthy of their respect. Dumitrache in particular sees himself as lucky that he may get to be in-laws with a future politician.

During the dialogue, Chiriac reveals that one of his hired hands, Dincă binagiul ("Foreman Dincă"), has absentmindedly switched the number 9 on Titircă's house, which is why Venturiano has entered that house instead of Zița's (whose actual home is across the street, at number 6). Rică further clarifies his intention of marrying Zița by going into a speech about the virtues of family life, within a regime of "liberty, equality, and fraternity". They all prepare to leave for their sleeping quarters, with Rică moving closer to Zița and with Chiriac standing by Veta's side. Just then, Dumitrache informs the men that there is still an unsettled matter, showing them a tie that was found near Veta's bed-pillows. Chiriac, initially startled, shrugs this off: "that tie is mine, don't you know?"; this placates his boss. The scene and the play end with all protagonists joyfully leaving together.

== Characters ==
=== Rică ===
Portrayals of Rică Venturiano
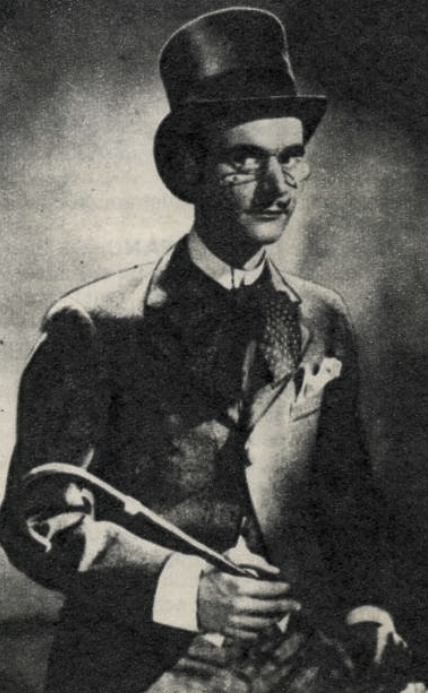
Radu Beligan, 1949

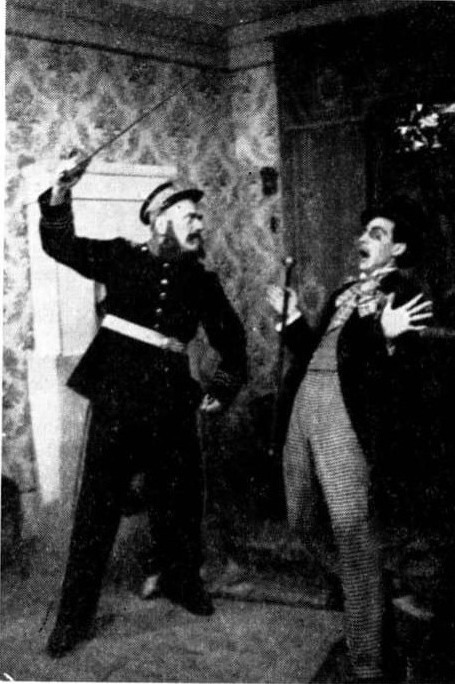
Mihai Fotino (with his father Mișu as Dumitrache), 1970

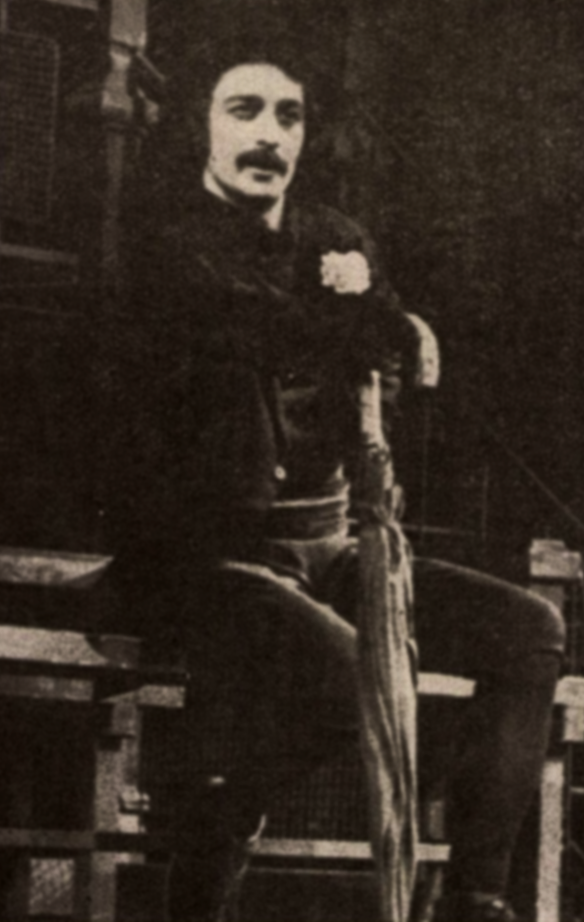
Gelu Bogdan Ivașcu, 1976

Boldea reviews Rică Venturiano as the symbol of a permanent confusion between registers, "the actor of a masquerade, confusing farce for tragedy". As observed by literary scholar Șerban Cioculescu, he sees himself as "a poet, a student, a publicist, a political theorist, whom only material want has made into an archival clerk"; he is contemptuous toward Dumitrache, shunning him as a "mere merchant, with no cultural horizon and no upbringing." However, if he has "descended into the mahala" in pursuit of Zița, it is because he senses that marrying her would greatly improve his own standing. His stated contempt for the mahala is reciprocated by its dwellers. The young man is introduced through Dumitrache's narration of the beer-garden incident; in this early part of the play, the captain voices his disdain for the youth, writing him off as a bagabont de amploaiat ("wage-collecting wastrel"), but also minutely describing his appearance, and indicating the Venturanio paraphernalia: top hat, ascot tie, glasses and cane.

As Ipingescu reads him from Vocea Patriotului Naționale, Dumitrache, not realizing that he had just insulted the author, expresses admiration for, but little understanding of, the language used therein. This is because Vocea uses an isolated jargon with experimental neologisms and Latinate spelling norms, as well as a highly irregular version of Romanian grammar. These traits replicate the norms of extreme-liberal newspapers such as Românul—but also, to a lesser degree, Alegătorul Liber and Unirea Democratică, where Caragiale himself had been reluctantly clerking in the early 1870s. In an 1896 piece, Caragiale referred to C. A. Rosetti, the late publisher of Românul, as having invented a "macaronic" Italo-Romanian lexis, which introduced the termination -(e)le for many masculine, definite-article nouns and, even more so, for adjectives (examples include directorele for "the director", instead of directorul, and sufragiu universale for sufragiu universal, "universal suffrage").

Cioculescu notes that the "Rosettist termination" is a standard of Vocea's prose, with Rică appearing as a caricatured Rosetti emulator, while Ornea regards Venturiano as a "typical Rosettist, in both the ideas he circulates and in his usage of bloated language." Scholar Alexandru Piru notes parallels between Venturiano and Clevetici, a buffoonish character in Vasile Alecsandri's 1860 play, Zgârcitul risipitor ("The Prodigal Miser"). Alecsandri had once acknowledged that Clevetici was a caricature of Rosetti and of Rosetti's one-time colleague, Ion Brătianu. Another literary historian, Gabriel Țepelea, argues that Rică's vocabulary is more politically neutral, being largely based on the "Latinate imprint" that Caragiale had observed in his erstwhile schoolteacher, Zaharia Antinescu, who continued to express himself in the made-up language as late as 1899. Venturiano's apparent inability to maintain the T–V distinction was also widely present in the regional newspapers of Prahova County, which Caragiale had read and sampled for comedic effect.

The language matter is also explored in the character's own name—since, as argued by sociolinguist Constantin-Ioan Mladin, Caragiale's in-play anthroponymy is designed to provide instant clues as to one's class origins and intellectual level: "Caragiale's demonstrates outstanding skill in characterizing people by their surnames, by their given names, and especially by a juxtaposition of both." "Rică" is a diminutive form accepted by several Romanian names, most commonly associated with "Aurel"; Caragiale's papers clarify that it stood for "Andrei" (Andrew), something which is also supported by a portion of the play—in which the panicking young man calls on his patron saint, Andrew the Apostle. The sketched-out sequel Titircă, Sotirescu & C-ie includes the complete and updated form of his name, as "Andrei Venturianu". In composing both names, especially in the earlier format, he strives for the inherently funny, with a humorous musical contrast. In addition to resembling the onomatopoeia of rooster crows, and as such introducing hints of machismo, "Rică" suggests "familiarity and cheerfulness" and the mahala atmosphere, while "Venturiano" is pronounced with a voiced nasal and then a rising tone, giving it unexpected gravitas.

While literary historian Garabet Ibrăileanu was convinced that Caragiale had selected it because it sounded roughly like aventuros ("adventurous"), the name, or slight variations of it, had some tradition in melodramatic literature as published by the Romanians of Austria-Hungary. Historian Nicolae Iorga identified its immediate origin in a non-comedic sketch story which had appeared in the 1874 edition of Aron Densușianu's paper, Orientul Latin. Its Romantic hero was "Alesandru Ventureanu", whose name, which would more naturally be rendered as "Alexandru Vântureanu", was spelled according to extreme Latinate norms that Caragiale habitually mocked; he took over the surname, and pretended to pronounce it as written, also changing the final vowel to reflect Francization. The root verb, a vântura, means "to scatter", and was probably used in Orientul Latin to suggest that Alesandru had been chased out of his home by a cruel fate; as argued by Cioculescu, the "Venturiano" version may bring in contrasting echoes from Romania's Phanariote legacy, making Rică a cosmopolitan and a "parvenu". One similar theory, embraced by linguist Alexandru Graur, derives Venturiano from Ventura, itself a Greek version of the Italian Buonaventura ("kind fate"). The other meanings of a vântura cover "dissemination", making it seem like Rică is talkative and inherently frivolous; the abbreviation R. Vent, used for his Vocea article, can be read as revent, "rhubarb"—a laxative of choice in traditional medicine.

Still without appearing onstage, Venturiano is introduced as a lover and a poet through Zița's reading of his letter, which is a mixture of Frenchified Romanian and plain French, opening with the macaronic exclamation: Angel radios! ("O radiant angel!", for which regular Romanian has Înger strălucitor!). This juxtaposition of two neologisms was recorded in a solemnly religious register, and can reportedly be found on an 1850s tombstone at Curtea Veche; according to linguist Mihaela Popescu, the two component words had such widespread use in Caragiale's time that Venturiano can be read as a joke on the public itself. Iorga reports that the first ironic use of such poetic language, including the word angel, had first appeared in an 1874 comedy by Teodor Myller, which Caragiale probably read; however, after comparing the two samples, Cioculescu proposes that Venturiano is a much more outrageous caricature, linking a whole tradition of Romantic and "elegiac" cliches—leading back to the 1840s poet, Dimitrie Bolintineanu. Popescu also identifies a precedent in Nicolae Filimon's various writings of the 1860s, including one which shows a Venturiano-like youngster, Râmătorian, making exaggerated, inadequate statements in front of his paramour. The letter read out by Zița includes Rică's own love poem, which also expands on the linguistic caricature:

Ești un crin plin de candoare, ești o fragilă zambilă,
Ești o roză parfumată, ești o tânără lalea!
Un poet nebun și tandru te adoră, ah! copilă!
De a lui pozițiune turmentată fie-ți milă;
Te iubesc la nemurire și îți dedic lira mea!
Al tău pentru o eternitate și per [sic] toujours.

Translation:

You are such a candid lily, such a fragile-small blue-bell,
You're a fragrant rose, my dear!, and a tulip in its youth!
Here's your poet, mad and tender, whom you twist and you compel,
Be mindful of his condition—which is tormented, uncouth;
I am yours, I am for ever, as my lyre is here to tell!
Yours I'll be for all the ages, and, what's more, for pour toujours.

Venturiano's grandiloquence is maintained throughout the play, with several exceptions, all of which have comedic undertones. During his confused encounter with Veta, he is flustered, freely producing rhymed prose and the statement: te iubesc precum iubește sclavul lumina și orbul libertatea ("I love you the way slaves love light and blind men love freedom"). His malapropisms appear during moments of panic at getting beaten up or lynched (when he takes up Veta's usage of the word "revolver" as levorver), but also during his triumphal speech, which uses box populi, box dei and a self-revelatory clusivity: Ori toți să muriți, ori toți să scăpăm! ("Let's all of you die, or let's all of us live!"). Dumitrache and Ipingescu mistake his volubility for eloquence and political competence, and especially by his proclamation that "family is the cornerstone of a society"; sensing that he might end up being the father-in-law of a minister, Dumitrache ends up groveling before Rică. The two guardsmen exchange impressions: "'He sure knows his stuff, I like him...' [...] 'Well of course he does, the man's a journalist.'"

=== Dumitrache and his acolytes ===
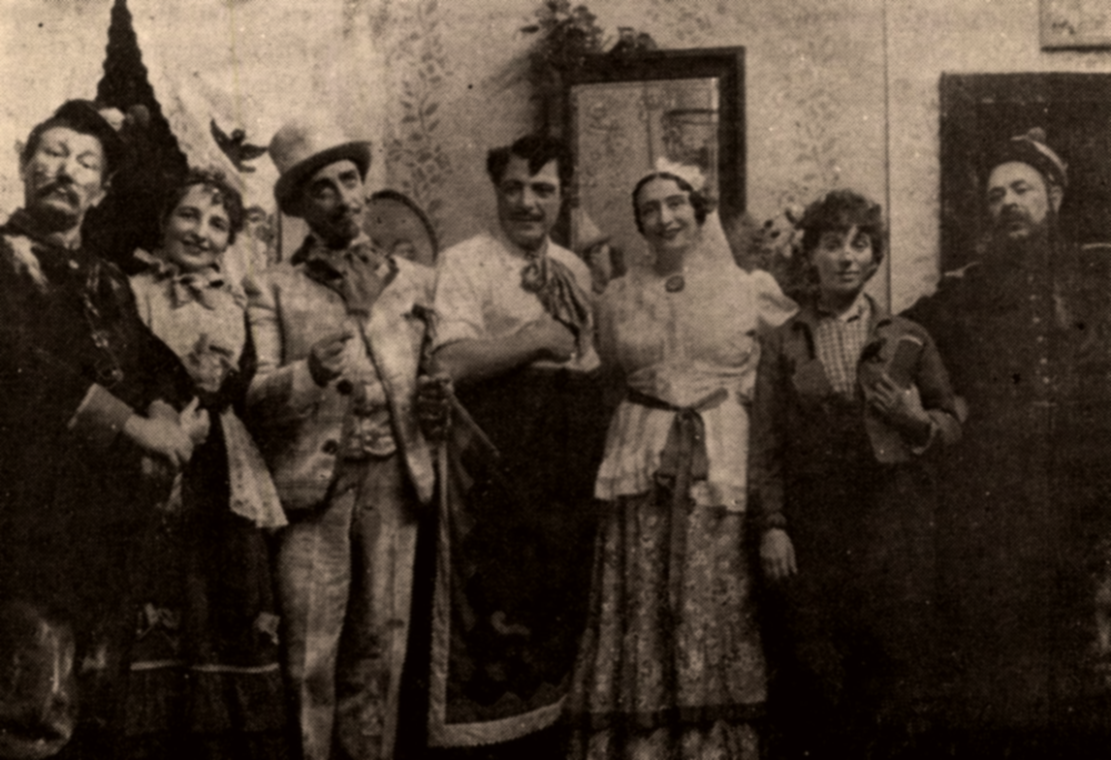
Full cast of a production by Sică Alexandrescu at Comedia Theater, c. 1937. From the left: Gheorghe Timică (Ipingescu)—Silvia Dumitrescu (Zița)—Ion Iancovescu (Rică)—Aurel Athanasescu (Chiriac)—Maria Filotti (Veta)—Leny Caler (Spiridon, in travesti)—Velimir Maximilan (Dumitrache)

An interpretative current originating, in Caragiale's lifetime, with the Marxist critic Constantin Dobrogeanu-Gherea, and later embraced by director Sică Alexandrescu, read Dumitrache, Chiriac and Spiridon as three facets of the same character, who is in term a stereotype of the inconsiderate petty bourgeoisie; this "sociological" take was summarized and rejected by Cioculescu, who argues that it fails to acknowledge Caragiale's method. The strange relationship established between Venturiano and these other male characters evokes elements of Caragiale's own biography—as he confessed in old age to his philosopher friend Paul Zarifopol, he had once been frequenting a lady lover, whose husband surprised him and beat him up, though they later became friends (the story, as recorded by Zarifopol, also notes that his erotic encounters were facilitated by his mistress' sister and her own lover, a beat-cop). Among the literary scholars, Barbu Lăzăreanu believed to have identified the core inspiration for Titircă in a report of 1865, which records that a Dumitru Andrei poreclit Inimă Rea ("nicknamed Bad Heart") had assaulted a Gendarme and had torn off his uniform in places. In his own defense plea, Andrei reports on his exact whereabouts during the events, using language that is very similar to Dumitrache's topographic record of his Venturiano chase (the report is countersigned by his witnesses, Trică Mitrică and Ilie Chiriac).

Several authors, including historian Vătămanu, believe that Titircă was entirely based on a real-life member of the Civic Guard. Vătămanu reports that he was an N. Dumitrache (1825–1900). The actual owner of a lumber yard, and still athletic into his fifties, he was known to his neighbors as a decent and charitable man, who had donated for the upkeep of Saint Spyridon the New Church, and had probably once sent money to the young Caragiale. According to Vătămanu, the fictional nickname was indeed a nod to Dumitru Andrei, who had become better known as a conservative-allied street bully. Within the purely literary realm, Caragiale was also probably inspired by Alecsandri's Kir Zuliardi, whose eponymous hero is, like Dumitrache, an oblivious and proud officer of the Guard (though, in Alecsandri's version, he is also a foreigner, depicted as either a Greek or an Arnaut). "Dumitrache" also has a Greek resonance (its termination, -ache, is from the Greek diminutive -aki), while his surname, Titircă, is Caragiale's invention, from the root verb a [se] titiri ("to get spruced up"); they both contrast his informal title of Jupân ("Master"). The character's personal lexis is infused with Wallachianisms and archaic influences from Ottoman Turkish, appearing early on in the text with samples such as veresie ("credit") and papugiu. The latter term, equivalent to "pauper", literally means "sandal-wearers", possibly because the lowest classes were not expected to wear expensive footwear.

Early versions of Dumitrache and Chiriac appeared in one of Caragiale's more obscure sketches, taken up by Claponul magazine of 1877. It shows Ghiță Calup, a "grocer and civic guard", trusting his shop assistant, Ilie, with both his business and his wife. The story is near-explicit in suggesting that Ilie has sex with the lady of the house: the necktie is found in Ghiță's conjugal bed (the master himself returns it to Ilie, advising him to take better care of his things), and the narrator concludes that Ilie is a "partner in citizen Ghiță's home". In the definitive play, Dumitrache is not just the duped husband, but also "the ambitious man", presumed to be aged around 45. His social climb rests on a number of economic principles, one of which is unwittingly revealed when he explains that, instead of buying tickets for "them German comedies", he and Veta should "switch that money to another pocket and say we went to see them."

During his own Marxist stage, literary historian George Călinescu referred to the Jupân as illustrating the bourgeoisie's reemergence as a "reactionary" class. His lumber yard still functions under the old corporate system, and he himself is "in his way, an 'honest' man"; however, "the morals of his class are centered on what's to be found in someone's purse". Sadoveanu suggests that Dumitrache is a "despot only in his talk", and fundamentally "debonair". However, he still notes his "associative thought" linking the character to Dikoi, the "authentic despot" of Alexander Ostrovsky's Storm. Commentators remain divided when it comes to assessing whether the character is truly oblivious, or whether he just feigns stupidity in order to spare his wife the humiliation. Sadoveanu believes in the former of two alternatives, arguing that Caragiale had at once explained and solved the conflict in the very last lines, condemning Dumitrache to "imbecility". As argued by the literary critic Vicu Mîndra, it is plausible that Titircă, like his Ghiță Calup prototype, is fully aware of Chiriac's dealings with Veta. Being obsessed with "honor", he prefers to have his wife's sexual desires satisfied by a "man of the house", and "consummate[d] within the enclosed perimeter of the personal domain." In similar vein, Cioculescu describes Dumitrache as a complex character, who never turns on Veta, not even after having discovered Venturiano hiding in her room. According to the same scholar, of all the actors who had taken on Dumitrache's role up to 1962, only Alexandru Giugaru had managed to capture "that authentic glimpse of moral gentleness", exploring Dumitrache's "fundamentally likeable" side.

Actor and memoirist Mihail Belador was convinced that Nae Ipingescu was based on a real-life patrolman, Sandu of Dealul Spirii. The character's baptismal name is the pet form of Nicolae ("Nicholas"), "very likely taken from children's jargon", while Ipingescu is formed by Caragiale from ipingea ("cloak"), adding the Romanian surname-suffix, -escu. The verbal suggestion is here is that Nae is of an "inferior social extraction, [with] an insipid job". In the original play's dramatis personae, the ipistaf is introduced as Dumitrache's "political friend"—whereby Caragiale jibes at the trafficking of favors within the Civic Guard, and at Ipingescu's servile characteristics. He adds a layer of comedy to Venturiano's prose in Vocea by displaying his own limited reading skill, and a disproportionate confidence in explaining the obscure terminology to his boss. His own variant of Romanian mixes freely mahala insults with Latinate borrowings, for instance by using Constituțiune ("Constitution", as opposed to the modern Constituție) and idem. His understanding of the word sufrágiu ("suffrage") as the near-homonymous sufragíu ("table-servant") appears earlier in Alecsandri's Iorgu de la Sadagura ("Iorgu of Sadagura"), as one of several elements shared by the two works. Philologist and poet Octavian Soviany notes that Ipingescu's high respect for Venturiano as a Vocea writer is what ultimately makes Dumitrache welcome the intruder into his own "illusory space".

Vătămanu's interpretation sees Chiriac as a literary version of Gheorghe Berevoianu, who had served the real-life Dumitrache before opening his own lumber yard (located near Colțea Church). His fictional surname is not revealed in the original text, but he is the "Sotirescu" in Titircă, Sotirescu & C-ie. One current in criticism, embodied by Călinescu, regards him as "dull", and as one of the least entertaining figures in Caragiale's prose; according to writer Mioara Cremene, he is materially dependent on Dumitrache, sharing the latter's "parvenu proclivities". Several fragments of the comedy emphasize the class solidarity between Dumitrache, Ipingescu and Chiriac, legitimized by their understanding of liberalism. As noted by scholar Eszter Kiss: "In their mouths, the word 'people' means power and those who exercise power. They see themselves as the people, [having] degraded revolutionary ideas and slogans into demagogic phrases, shaped them in their own image, and harnessed them in service of their own interests." Chiriac is individualized by his adulterous passion and simmering conflict with his mentor. Scholar Ștefan Cazimir proposes that his threat of suicide, never serious, marks an "exhaustion of romantic impulses", or the moment in which Romantic heroes only return as caricatures. According to Soviany, Chiriac's final intervention, which clarifies that the tie is his, changes the play from a classical pattern, which seemed to reinforce Titircă's credibility and authority, into a "centrifugal" and "absurd" resolution that is unlike any comedic precedent.

=== The sisters ===
Veta and Zița's names were pet forms of the once-common names Elisaveta ("Elisabeth") and Zoe, respectively. Vătămanu's reading suggest that their real-life prototypes had similar names: Veta, who ended up divorcing the real-life Dumitrache, was in reality Paraschiva, or "Vița", while her sister Victorița, or "Rița". As noted by Cioculescu, both are unlike other female characters in Caragiale's comedies in that they "do not display any sort of interest in political affairs." Cioculescu reserves praise for Caragiale's "psychological finesse" in uncovering the passion that exists between Veta and Chiriac, mostly through a set of revealing gestures on Veta's part—her tending to Chiriac's uniform, her absentmindedness, her feigning sickness to disguise her distress at having upset him, and a number of revealing verbal clues. It remains unclear whether they have yet consummated their affair, though, as Cioculescu argues, it is plausible that they did—in part, because some early versions of the play suggest that Chiriac's missing necktie is found "ruffled" (Caragiale himself removed this detail from the definitive print). The same critic believes that Caragiale intended to show Veta as facing a midlife crisis (or "crepuscular femininity"), and that she uses Chiriac for sexual reassurance, having "never once loved" Dumitrache; though Veta's age is never mentioned, Zița's unusual politeness in addressing her, and her 9th-scene mothering of Chiriac, mean that she is significantly older than both. According to Cazimir, she is aged 30.

Cioculescu sees Veta as authentically tragic, and notes that her part would fit within a drama, were it not for Dumitrache's obliviousness, his inability to "even question her concern for Chiriac." As read by Cazimir, she always manages to be more authentic, and less "kitsch", than her younger sister. Her initial reaction is to shun "them German comedies", which Zița desperately wants to show up—Veta believes that theater should be understandable and pleasurable, whereas Zița openly suggests that the self-evident reason for attending such shows is "to see who else is there", de capriț și pamplezir ("for the kicks"). Unlike Zița, she is unaware of the literary trope used by Venturiano when he declares himself "mad" (with passion), and is ready to assume that he may be an escaped mental patient.

However, the elder sister displays her own familiarity with lowbrow post-Romantic literature, when she mutters lyrics from George Sion. Cazimir notes that this intertextual hint evokes a deeper level of kitsch: the poem in Veta's version is slightly modified from Sion's original, and thus closely reproduces a variant published in Dorul almanac throughout the 1860s. She picks up from this version the neologistic verb a compătimi ("to commiserate"), which seeps into her speech as a pleonasm: [ei] compătimesc împreună ("[they] commiserate with each other")—one of several examples of her verbal redundancy. Another fragment of Veta's singing has been tracked down by Cioculescu to an anonymous romance collected by N. D. Popescu-Popnedea. Cazimir argues that Veta remains insincere, and herself kitsch, when her self-reported "sensible" nature, with its approval of public reserve, does not prevent her from pursuing Chiriac inside her own home. Director Carlo Di Stefano identified her as a "complete character of female shrewdness and wickedness", but also retained that she is sincerely in love with Chiriac.

Zița's fundamental hypocrisy is in her self-presentation as "delicate", which does not prevent her from casually recounting her own violent outbursts against her former husband. Philologist Mircea Tomuș highlighted her usage of the terms nene and țață in addressing Dumitrache and Veta, respectively. These pinpoint her familiarity with the "code of conduct" of an ancestral market town. Possibly aged 21, she is repeatedly shown to have attended boarding school, which hints at her being shaped by the cliches of late Romanticism (this being also why she ultimately finds Venturiano beguiling). In one fragment of his prose, Caragiale mocks this upbringing as lectură Romantică ("readings of Romanticism"), a term that Cazimir finds useful for summarizing the intellectual background shared by Zița and other Caragialesque females. She and her passion for reading have immediate, if less studied, models in mahala-themed comedies by Caragiale's uncle, Costache Caragiale.

=== Background and unseen characters ===
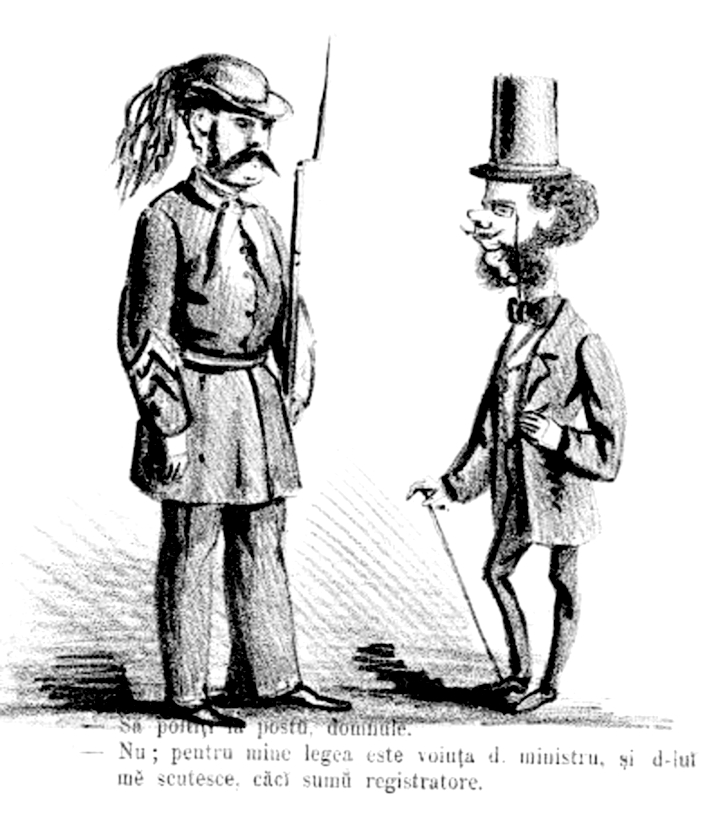
A foppish young man trying to evade recruitment by the Civic Guard. From an August 1866 cartoon in the liberal magazine, Ghimpele

Spiridon, a boy who performs menial duties for Dumitrache and his family, makes a key appearance in shrewdly negotiating Venturiano's fate. Economist Radu Vasile took him as an example of the apprentice lumberman who doubles as a domestic worker, remarking that this fit the profile of most on-job trainees, as revealed by an 1863 occupational census. Tomuș has proposed that he is in fact a relative of Dumitrache's, from one side of the family that never managed to become prosperous. The same scholar highlights Spiridon's unusual position, as an illiterate person who is made to carry the gazette, which Dumitrache uses for structuring and restructuring his own understanding of the world. Cremene sees Spiridon as "destitute and exploited", but also transformed by Dumitrache's influence: "he lies, he takes bribes, he acts as an amorous in-between." According to Piru, the boy is at least partly based on servants appearing in 1860s plays by Caragiale's other uncle, Iorgu Caragiale—and, beyond, in August von Kotzebue's Wer weiß, wozu das gut ist.

Journalist Tudor Lavric proposes that A Stormy Night is largely dependent on unseen actions by unseen characters, of whom the most important one is Dincă binagiul. Zița's status as a divorcee outlines her continuing troubles with her former husband, Ghiță Țârcădău (spelled Țircădău in the earliest print versions), whom she frames as a violent, even criminal, figure. Theatrologist Valentin Silvestru sees his invocation as entirely useful for explaining why Zița would welcome Rică's advances. Never seen onstage, he carries a rare name: the juxtaposition of "Ghiță", as a "hypochoristic abbreviation of the name Gheorghe", and "Țârcădău" (ultimately from țărcădău, "sheep pen"), may have struck the writer as useful in suggesting a "humble social origin and uncouth character". The choice may also be evocative of Caragiale's youth in Ploiești—an Alecu Țărăcădău ran a bakery in that city until his death in 1891.

The other unseen character is revealed through Ipingescu's lines. In taking pride at their impressment activities for the Guard, the ipistaf and Chiriac briefly mention having cornered "Tache the Shoemaker", who is a "godson to Popa-Tache". The latter was a real-life Romanian Orthodox priest (his real name was Constantin Rădulescu, and he was parson at Delea Nouă Church), who also worked as a political agent and street bully for the conservative groups, soon after unified into the Conservative Party. At the time of writing, the public had a clear understanding of this reference—in early 1875, Popa-Tache had sought to prevent the formation of a unified National Liberal Party by leading a charge on Stephen Bartlett Lakeman's townhouse, where the liberal factions held caucus, and having them pummeled or sprayed with chili powder; he had been humiliated during the subsequent general election, when the liberals had formed self-defense units, maiming his subordinates and forcing Popa-Tache to wade across the Dâmbovița River. Mention of this historical figure also highlights Ipingescu's unscrupulousness, since it implies that he sees no issue in harassing conservatives to service the liberals' machine. The godson is resisting the roll-call, but the play never clarifies if he is genuinely a moribund, as he claims, or if he plays sick to annoy his would-be captors. Chiriac, who assumes the latter variant, is also noticeably ruthless in addressing the shoemaker's truancy, exposing himself further as Dumitrache and Ipingescu's client.

== Productions ==
=== Early performances and related scandal ===
Before completing A Stormy Night, Caragiale, still working as a minor journalist, had enjoyed massive and unexpected success with his translation of Dominique-Alexandre Parodi's Rome vaincue. This had brought him to the attention of Junimea society, whose leader, Titu Maiorescu invited him in his Bucharest home in 1877. He felt encouraged to complete his own play, now imbued with Junimist ideology; he gave his first reading at Junimea's original hub in Iași, in November 1878—when the group was celebrating its 15th anniversary with a banquet in Iacob Negruzzi's home. On that occasion, Negruzzi enlisted Caragiale as the 82nd Junimea affiliate. Maiorescu's diaries record the text as a "lively comedy", giving its working title: Noaptea furtunoasă de la numĕrul 9 ("The Stormy Night at No 9"); Negruzzi recalled in 1931 that Caragiale had a "rather raspy voice which fit in perfectly with the characters of the Bucharest mahala". It reputedly "won over all those present", including Maiorescu himself, and was credited by the Juminists as a "complete revolution in Romanian theater." As once observed by Cioculescu, the Junimist doyen had multiple reasons for promoting the play, one of which was personal: between July 1877 and January 1878, he had resisted attempts by the Civic Guard to have him take mandatory military training in one of its barracks.

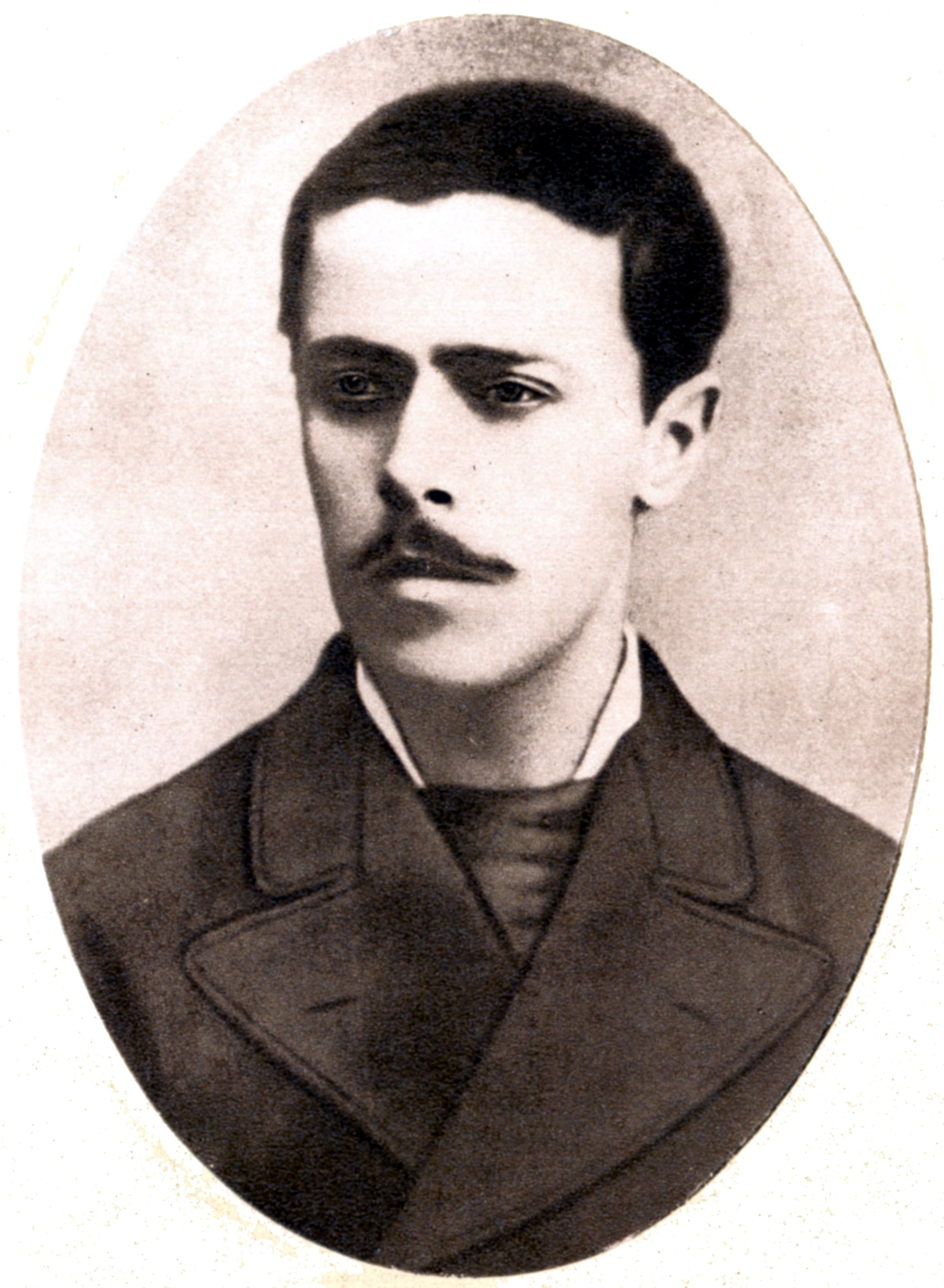
Caragiale in 1879

Negruzzi made it his personal mission to publish the play, and a string of other Caragiale creations, in the society's magazine, Convorbiri Literare. As Noaptea furtunoasă sau Numĕrul 9 ("The Stormy Night or Number 9"), the work was taken up by the National Theater Bucharest (TNB), which was then under the direction of writer-politician Ion Ghica. A moderate among the liberals, Ghica had made a habit of ridiculing Rosetti, whom he once called an "old macaque". It was "immensely successful" on its very first showing of 18 January 1879, in part because of Ștefan Iulian's consummate performance as Ipingescu—though Caragiale himself was more enthusiastic about Mihai Mateescu as Rică. The young author was affected by "something resembling stage fright", asking for his name to be removed from the playbill; the premiere's audience included Barbu Bălcescu and his daughters, one of whom reported seeing him "all pale and shivering, cursing the day he got down to write it". He received a standing ovation, prompting Aristizza Romanescu, who performed as Veta, to call him on the stage.

The dominant intellectual circles, as well as segments of the general populace, were scandalized by the play, with a "veritable storm of protests and curses in the contemporary press." Newspapers were near-unanimous in describing A Stormy Night as "immoral", since it did not apparently frown on Veta's adultery. To Caragiale's surprise, a version of this critique was also found in a review published by the Junimist tribune, Timpul, and signed by his friend, Ioan Slavici. Cioculescu suggests that Slavici was exceptionally prudish, while fellow scholar Pompiliu Marcea believes that his attitude toward the play, which never changed, was a product of Slavici's belief in "national solidarity" as cultivated by didactic art. Another paper, Binele Public, featured an unsigned chronicle which questioned the play's validity, since, it argued, the characters were "perishable"—as Cioculescu notes, the anonymous author was the first in a line of Caragiale skeptics, leading down to Pompiliu Eliade and Eugen Lovinescu, all of whom raised the same marginal objection.

On the second performance, members of the Civic Guard bought tickets and continuously heckled the actors, also waiting for Caragiale to show up and receive a beating. Vătămanu reports that the mob included "Fierăscu and the painter Alexandrescu", both of whom lived close to N. Dumitrache, suggesting that they may have seen themselves portrayed as Ipingescu and Venturiano, respectively. By his own account, the young writer only escaped being injured because of some Land Forces officers, who intervened between him and the paramilitaries. Ghica had by then removed portions of the text without informing the author, causing the latter to withdraw his text, as a form of protest. However, according to Marcea, the current version of the play preserves some of Ghica's interventions, and therefore has fewer offensive passages, its content reduced by two acts from the original four; as he puts it, "we do not know" the text as used for the original performance. The same was acknowledged by journalist N. Porsenna, who noted in 1924 that "the text can no longer be located." Porsenna was nonetheless able to collect testimonies from one of the participants. According to this indirect record, the play's original act, comprising the talk between Dumitrache and the ipistaf, took place in the former's shop, leading to a quarrel and then a fire engulfing the building; the current play was extended over the next three acts. Porsenna's source believed that the reduction was Caragiale's own initiative, since he "found the first act to be superfluous".

During Caragiale's boycott, the play, whether in its first or second version, was only performed by some of Bucharest's private theaters, with highly popular charity-shows, many of which featured the Caragiale-approved comedian Nicolae Hagiescu. In 1880, the theatrical establishment preferred to showcase another political and anti-liberal play—Sânziana și Pepelea; its similarities with Caragiale's text (possibly coincidental, since Alecsandri had probably written his comedy in or before 1879) include the box populi catchphrase. This premiere was followed in 1881 by Alexandru Macedonski's short play, Iadeș ("Wishbone"). It centers on the superficially romantic lawyer Aninoșescu, seen by Macedonski's disciple and biographer, Tudor Vianu, as a retake on the Venturiano type.

In 1883, the TNB, no longer chaired by Ghica, was allowed to resume performances of A Stormy Night, featuring the same cast. In the mid-1880s, liberal reviewers had become more lenient, but, as with novelist and chronicler Nicolae Xenopol, preferred to treat the text as an entertaining farce. Caragiale experienced a brief moment of political success in 1888, when Junimea loyalist Theodor Rosetti took over as Prime Minister of Romania, making him Head of Theaters. This position allowed him to become personally involved in productions of his play by the TNB, where Maria Ciucurescu became his choice for Veta, with her sister Eugenia appearing regularly as Zița. According to their recollections, he was enthusiastic about the lines improvised by Maria, and added them to the play in its second print; Eugenia was also the first to appear as Zița in a casual morning-gown, rather than in full costume, persuading Caragiale that this was more realistic.

Public protests erupted in 1890, when Iulian allowed Iancu Brezeanu to take over as Ipingescu; Brezeanu was able to convince the public that he would not improve on his predecessor's standard performance, and went on to perform in that role for almost 50 years. At various times, this ensemble also included a young Maria Giurgea, appearing in travesti as Spiridon—she was almost sacked on her first appearance, after reflexively cursing the violent Dumitrache (this was the first documented instance in which Romanian profanity had been uttered on any stage). The public's enduring enthusiasm for the play prompted the National Theater Iași and the National Theater Craiova to begin their own stagings. A continuous string of authorized and unauthorized production followed, with Caragiale noting in 1899 that his text had effectively been stolen, and that virtually no one paid him royalties on it. He continued to involve himself in authorized production and, in 1905, watched on approvingly as Nicolae Soreanu began studying for Venturiano. The same role was taken up at the TNB by Petre Liciu, who was described by his colleague Ion Livescu as the best Venturiano of the early 20th century. In parallel, the aspiring comedian Constantin Tănase broke with tradition by reciting Dumitrache's lines, instead of lyrical poetry, for his entry exam at the Bucharest Conservatory.

=== Within Caragiale's political series ===
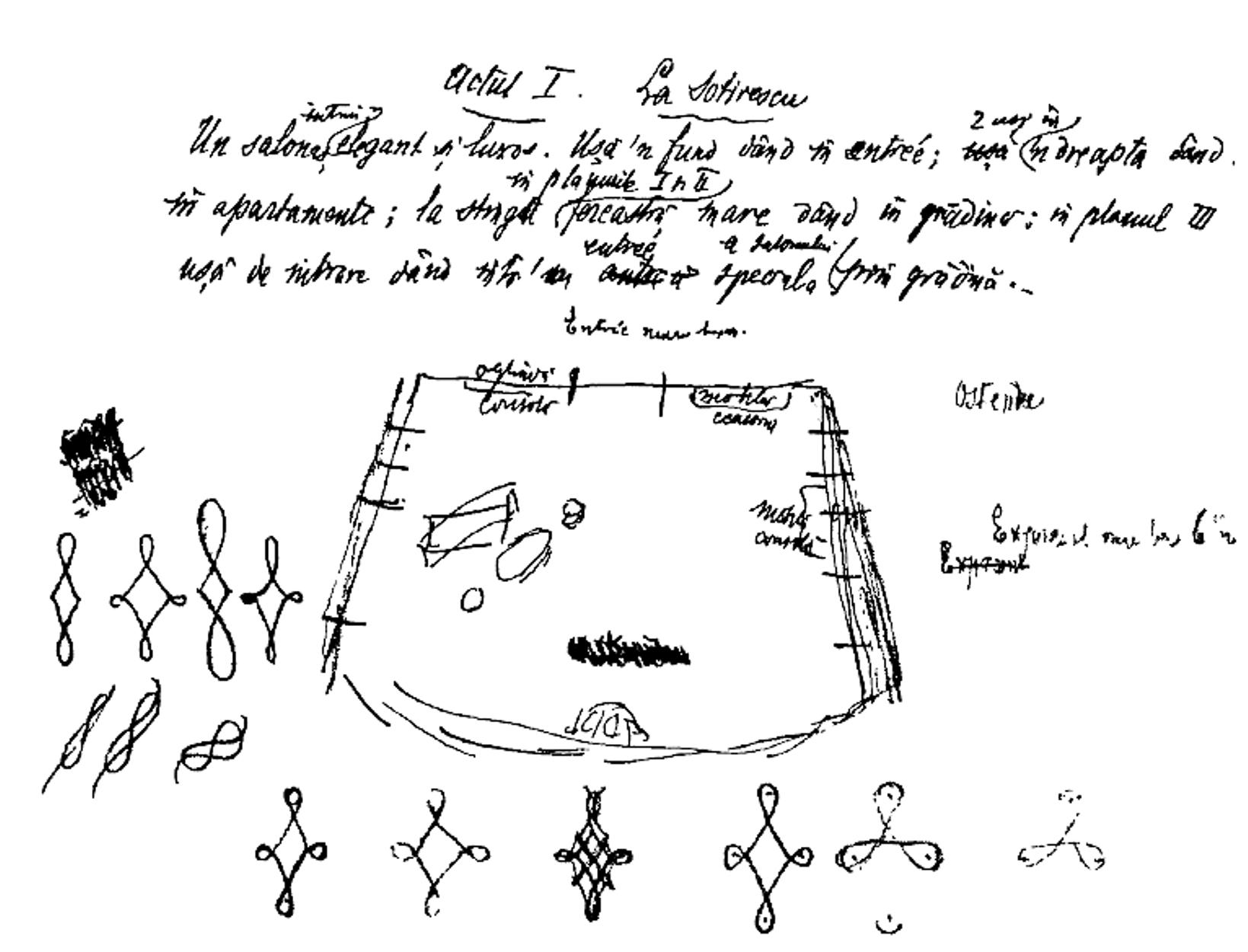
Caragiale's layout of Chiriac's home, from a 1904 draft of Titircă, Sotirescu & C-ie

The aestheticist and Caragiale supporter Mihail Dragomirescu regarded A Stormy Night as mainly a political play, which underscored his own theory that the source of all major masterpieces was political. On 29 March 1878, Caragiale himself had explained in Timpul that he no longer regarded "liberal" as a word of praise, but rather as a "problematic virtue"; on 8 April, he clarified further that he only had esteem for Nicolae Bălcescu and Ion Heliade Rădulescu, suggesting that they, as conservative liberals, could never have associated with 1870s National Liberal group. He described the latter as steered by ill-reputed characters such as Alecu D. Holban, Pantazi Ghica (who was Ion Ghica's brother), and George Missail. As early as April 1879, Caragiale's friend, the conservative poet-journalist Mihai Eminescu, had embraced "Venturiano" as symbolizing a "species" of "mediocrities" whom "one really needs to discourage". His article proposed that the gallery of Venturianos should include Frédéric Damé, a Franco-Romanian republican journalist and noted plagiarist; this was twice a discreet encouragement of Caragiale, for validating both his art as a dramatist and his conflict with Damé. According to Vianu, the twin efforts by Caragiale and Macedonski had managed to reshape the "young romantic intellectual" type into a full-blown caricature, down to the 1910s—when the idealistic depiction returned timidly, with plays by Dimitrie Anghel, Ștefan Octavian Iosif, and Mihail Sorbul.

The attack on liberal tenets, causing an uproar in the 1870s, came to be seen as exaggerated by more lenient critics, including several of Caragiale's supporters—they have noted that Venturiano is a caricature of demagoguery and hypocrisy, but that the political ideals he claims to speak for are not in themselves ridiculous. As a scion of the nationalist right, Nicolae Iorga argued that Rosetti's followers were not all-wrong in their patriotism. He saw Caragiale's comedies as both excessive in their approach and framed by the "immobility" of Junimism. Situated more to the left, Cioculescu argued that "bourgeois progressivism" and republicanism, as rendered through parody in Vocea, were not ridiculous in themselves–"only their formulation is". Ornea likewise proposes that: "Had the republican ideal been defended with determination, and not tarnished by conjectural interests, [Venturiano's republicanism] would be commendable. Alas, the anti-dynasticism proclaimed in certain circles (of whom the Rosettists were loudest) was well concealed, and pushed out into the open only when it suited this or that political intrigue." Țepelea, who argues that Caragiale was unfair toward liberal idealists, extends this critique to the language, noting that Latinate forms were more widespread and reasonable than they appear in Venturiano's debased rendition. The play still resonated with Marxist reviewers, since it bordered on their own critique of Romanian liberalism. One of them is Mîndra, who proposes that Caragiale's mockery of the Guard was in itself a satire of the bourgeoisie's obsession with titles and ranks. He sees the Guard itself as a "typical institution for the pseudo-democratic smokescreen put up by the 'constitutional' bourgeois regime".

Caragiale expanded on his anti-liberalism with another comedy play, O scrisoare pierdută, which he completed in 1884. Ornea suggests that this work expands on the critique of Rosettism, shown here to have been embraced by a whole class of "extremist-minded intellectuals"; lawyer Nae Cațavencu is a more vociferous version of Venturiano, with his own newspaper, Răcnetul Carpaților ("The Roar of the Carpathians"), being intentionally "a few octaves higher than Vocea Patriotului Naționale". The stylistic elements of continuity, also found in the 1885 farce, D'ale carnavalului, were highlighted by Tomuș: all three plays show "an amorous triangle entangled with the obsessing over one's honor." The planned sequel Titircă, Sotirescu & C-ie, on which Caragiale was writing around the time of his death in 1912, focuses on Dumitrache and Chiriac's social climb, turning the former into a landowner and oil magnate, as well as a Senator, and the latter into a former Deputy. It would have had them meeting Cațavencu, himself a government minister; Venturiano is instead pushed into the opposition, and continues to agitate in the press, this time as editor of Alarma Română ("The Romanian Alarm"). His elderly brother in law now regards him as a "scoundrel" (lichea). In another such twist, Chiriac was supposed to have become a victim of conjugal infidelity, which is more explicitly described in Titircă, Sotirescu & C-ie. In one version of the project, his wife, Pulchérie de Gantscho, has a toddler, apparently born from her affair with Spiridon.

Though subject to continuous changes and with possibly no scene ever written down completely, Titircă, Sotirescu & C-ie was meant to explore the social uplift of that generation. In line with Caragiale's string of sketch stories, of "telegrams", it poked fun at both conservatives and liberals, and further implied that Dumitrache had moved to the right, closer to Junimea (whose own political practices had largely disappointed Caragiale); the fragmentary dossier includes a clipping from Politica newspaper of Buzău, with a sample of Conservative-Party propaganda. The play's development was closely followed by Dragomirescu, who, like Caragiale, had defected Junimism and was embracing the more populist Conservative-Democratic Party, led by Take Ionescu. In 1910, reacting to news that Caragiale had joined Ionescu's faction, Conservative journalist Ioan Manoliu jibed that the dramatist had come to see eye to eye with both Dumitrache and Venturiano. A non-satirical assessment, provided by Cioculescu, reaches the same conclusion. He argues that Caragiale, who had come to advocate for universal suffrage, had had a "revival of sympathy" toward Venturiano and his kind.

=== 20th-century standardization ===
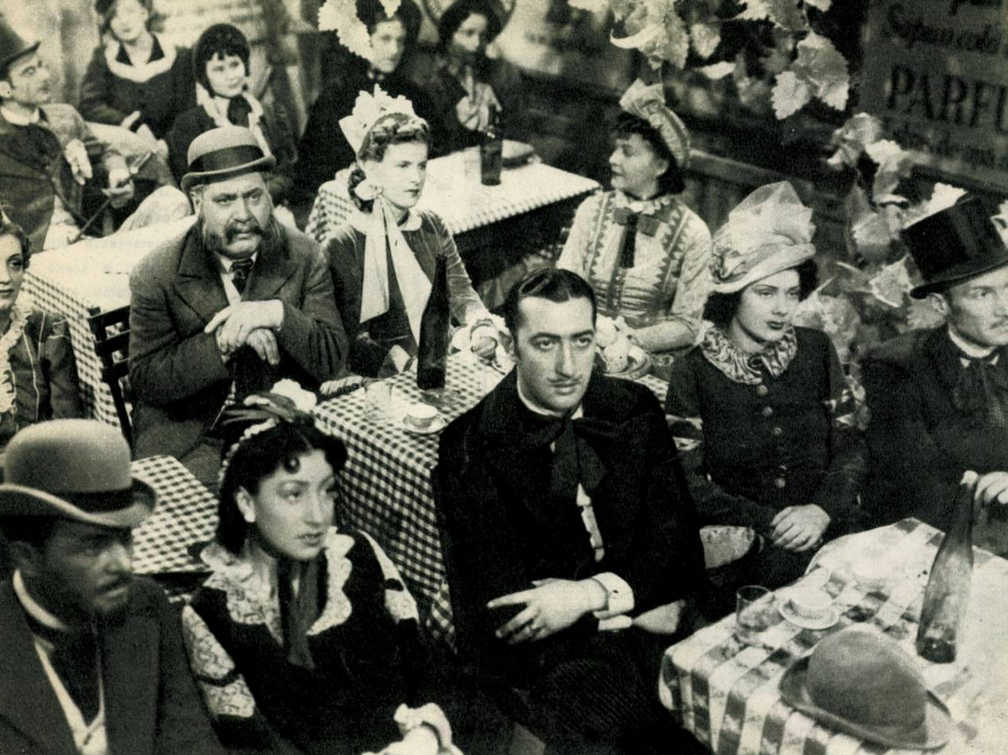
Dumitrache (Alexandru Giugaru) at Iunion, one of several scenes added in Jean Georgescu's film version. Giugaru is the only man seated in the second row, with Zița (Florica Demion) and Veta (Maria Maximilian); behind them, in top hat, is their stalker, Rică Venturiano (Beligan)

The mid-to-late stages of World War I saw Romania being defeated and partly occupied by the Central Powers, who managed to take Bucharest. In the early stages of the occupation, a Conservative, Ioan C. Filitti, was made chairman of the TNB. He tried to preserve the same program, including A Stormy Night, but was ultimately forced to cede the building, which became an annex of the Hessian Theater. This effectively interrupted stagings of A Stormy Night and many other Romanian plays. Romania reentered the war during the Vardar offensive, and the building was recovered; serving as TNB chairman to December 1918, Constantin Rădulescu-Motru made a point of resuming production of the play. Meanwhile Bessarabia (the former Russian governorate and Moldavian Democratic Republic) had united with Romania, allowing for Caragiale's plays to be performed for a larger Romanian-speaking audience. In the late 1920s and early '30s, the newly opened National Theater Chișinău staged its own production of A Stormy Night, employing Brezeanu for his consecrated role.

The Caragiale-approved repertory version of the play, with Brezeanu and the Ciucurescus, was resumed in January 1924, and enjoyed uninterrupted success. By then, the secondary title had been dropped. It continued to be re-staged in Bucharest with some regularity, and celebrated its 100th performance in December 1931. That same year, as part of his visual homages to Caragiale, Aurel Jiquidi released an album of Stormy Night-themed lithographs. The comedy continued to inform his work to 1960, when he created portrayals of Venturiano as an old-age pensioner, and of Spiridon as a shrewd capitalist. As early as 1929, Soare Z. Soare produced a radioplay version for the Romanian state broadcaster, with Paul Stratilat as Rică. Caragiale's text, meanwhile, inspired a similarly titled opéra bouffe, written by Paul Constantinescu in 1934–1935. Incorporating mahala music by Anton Pann, it was first performed at the Bucharest Opera under Jonel Perlea's musical direction, with Lucian Nanu performing as Rică.

By 1937, many of the play's original performers had either died or been retired. In October of that year, impresario Lică Teodorescu organized a final tour with the survivors reprising their roles—including Giurgea, who agreed to return as Spiridon. During December, Marin Iorda released another adapted, voice-only version of the play, also aired on national radio. The psychiatrist and cinephile Ion Filotti Cantacuzino was already campaigning in 1939 for Romanian cinema production of the play. Working on a screenplay, he proposed that René Clair be called in to direct.

In 1942, at the height of World War II, Jean Georgescu managed to complete the film project, which won enduring critical acclaim. Done from Georgescu's screenplay (though with some input from Filotti Cantacuzino), it had its production values greatly diminished by wartime vicissitudes, including the imposition of a blackout. Alexandru Giugaru appeared therein as Dumitrache; it also featured the debut film role of a 25-year-old Radu Beligan, whom Georgescu selected over the more famous, but less believable, Grigore Vasiliu Birlic. The film version takes some liberties with the theatrical standard, including with cameo appearances by Țârcădău (George Ciprian) and Tache the Shoemaker, the latter of whom is shown to by terminally ill. Spiridon is unusually performed by a 13-year-old with no previous acting experience, Ștefan Baroi. According to a later note by film critic D. I. Suchianu, the Romanian government, led by a far-right Ion Antonescu, issued some objections to his playing Spiridon as a "socialist" who resents the establishment.

The war period also witnessed another stage production at Iași—aiming for naturalness, it had Nicolae Massim as its director, and employed Ștefan Ciubotărașu as Dumitrache. The equivalent institution in Bucharest, presided at that time by Liviu Rebreanu, marked Caragiale's 30th commemoration in 1942 with productions of all his plays, including a new version of A Stormy Night. Ion Ulmeni was Dumitrache, and Florin Scărlătescu—Venturiano. This program was rivaled by the National Theater Cluj, which had been evacuated from Northern Transylvania to Sibiu. It also used Caragiale's text for a new production, premiering in October 1942.

=== Stalinist interval ===
Following the successful coup against Antonescu, left-wing interpretations of the play could be made public, including in a 1945 staging at the new Bucharest Workers' Theater. A Romanian communist regime was inaugurated in 1948, and reformulated its take on Romanian social and cultural history with input from Marxism-Leninism, and, initially, Stalinism as well. In that generation, the Communist Party leadership included Ana Pauker, who was well versed in Caragiale's writing, appreciated in particular A Stormy Night, and used its title to mock the conspiratorial methods employed by colleagues such as Teohari Georgescu. Sociological readings of Caragiale became a standard of literary discourse during the Stalinist supremacy. Chronicling Sică Alexandrescu's production, which premiered at the TNB in 1949 (and had Beligan reprising his film role on the stage), Cremene suggested that Marxism had a mission to liberate the text from its "bourgeois" censors, who had staged it as "merely an 'insignificant' farce, [...] with tinges that are downright pornographic." She commended Alexandrescu for highlighting its value as a document of the "corruption and immorality that were characteristic of the ruling classes". Also then, journalist Nestor Ignat commented that the play was "a weapon in the fight for the full liquidation of the exploiting classes". Looking back on the event some 18 years later, theater critic Margareta Bărbuță suggested that Alexandrescu had "reinstated A Stormy Night to its rightful place."

According to its official communiques, the communist government ensured that productions of A Stormy Night in 1950–1952 "surpassed by a hundred all the stagings that the bourgeois-landowning regime has witnessed over 65 years!" There were state celebrations of the Caragiale centennial in 1952, even as the writer's daughter, Ecaterina Logadi, was held in prison for political crimes; the 1942 film was re-released, but the print was heavily modified by communist censorship, which permanently deleted a scene in which Veta strips down to her negligee. The Alexandrescu version of A Stormy Night, with Giugaru and Beligan, was also recorded on national radio in 1952, and released as a collectible LP in May 1969. In that context, Beligan reported that he was basing his reading of Venturiano, rooted in Stanislavski's system, on several new sources. These included the surviving fragments of Titircă, Sotirescu & C-ie, alongside Caragiale's depictions of various other journalists and politicians, including the National Liberal Dimitrie Sturdza.

Alexandrescu was called upon to direct A Stormy Night for a major show performed during 1962, celebrated by the regime as the "Caragiale Year". This was also his attempt to perpetuate his "Caragiale School" by having young trainees such as Mihai Fotino (Venturiano) and Coca Andronescu (Zița) appear alongside the aging Giugaru (who was again acclaimed as Dumitrache), the middle-aged Niki Atanasiu (who chose to play Chiriac as "violent and abject"), and other consecrated figures. Meanwhile, Constantinescu's opera was removed from the official program, panned on grounds similar to the work which inspired it. The communist takeover also resulted in a literary purge, pushing interwar exegetes such as Cioculescu into the margins of society. In order to still make a living, he became an antiquarian bookseller and sold items from his own collection—reported to have included Caragiale's original manuscript of A Stormy Night.

There was also a purge of party cadres seen as unreliable or liberal; one such victim was Belu Zilber. Zilber later discarded socialism altogether, commenting that its one saving grace was having evolved not just under Joseph Stalin's influence, but also that of Caragiale himself. One version of this quote includes an additional note: "Romanian socialism was indeed A Stormy Night. But it was A Stormy Night with a Stalinist epilogue." In parallel, the play had become an intertextual component of various writings by Camil Petrescu. His novel, Un om între oameni, is centered on the Wallachian revolution of 1848, and depicts early Romanian liberals from the Rosetti circle. Its fictionalized portrayal of Scarlat Turnavitu relies heavily on Venturiano, and implies that some of the latter's amorous misadventures had happened to the real-life Turnavitu. One of Petrescu's last-ever works was the 1957 play Caragiale în vremea lui ("Caragiale in His Time"), which also suggests that A Stormy Night is based on real-life events. Costache Titircă, as the inspiration for Dumitrache, chances upon the real-life Caragiale after having seen the play; instead of being upset at his wife's secrets being exposed for the world, he is adamantly unpersuaded that the caricature targets her and himself, listing all the superficial differences between reality and its fictionalized version.

=== Revivals: experimental versus "innocent" ===
The mid- to late-1960s engendered a change of cultural policy: in May 1965, during his first-ever speech as leader of the Communist Party, Nicolae Ceaușescu indicated his respect for Caragiale as an exponent of cultural innovation and Romanian specificity, thereby signaling a deeper liberalization within the confines of national-communism. Constantinescu's version was again taken up by the Cluj Opera in 1971, expressly because of a "desire to promote Romanian operas". By 2010, it had come to be seen as a "masterpiece of the genre". Modernist rehashing of Caragiale's text, specifically directed against the sociological reading of Alexandrescu and others, began in the 1960s, when director Valeriu Moisescu called for joining A Stormy Night with the Theater of the Absurd; columnist Dinu Săraru looked back on this as a mistake. In a 1984 article, critic Ion Calion suggested that the experimental reinterpretation of Caragiale's comedies was inaugurated in 1966, when Lucian Pintilie directed a new version of D'ale carnavalului, in "evident contrast [with] Sică Alexandrescu's productions."

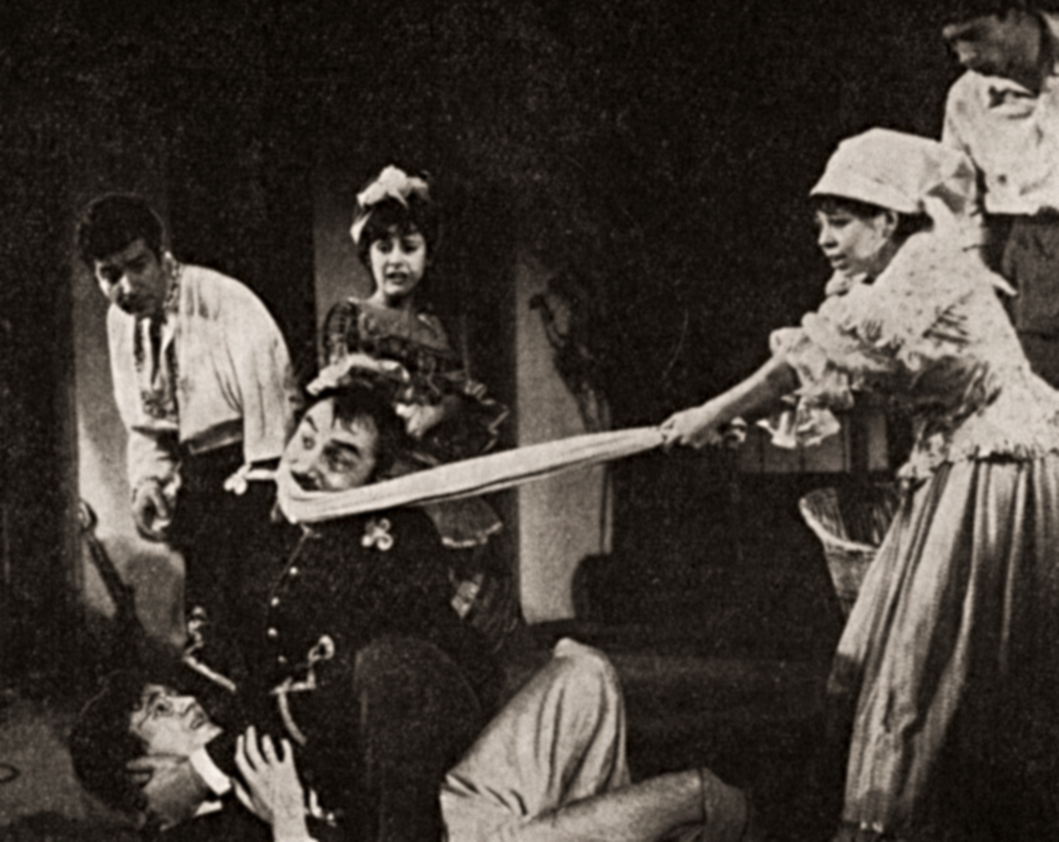
Rică Venturiano's capture in Act II, Scene IX, George Rafael version. Venturiano (Ștefan Iordache) is pinned down by Dumitrache (Dan Nicolae), who is himself trapped in linen by the two female characters—Zița (Melania Cârje), on the left, and Veta (Liliana Tomescu). The background shows Chiriac (Ion Dichiseanu) on the far-left, and Spiridon (Mihai Ioniță)

Săraru was unimpressed by A Stormy Night's modern reinterpretation at the Nottara Theater (1966–1967), which had George Rafael as director and Ștefan Iordache as Venturiano. This version had added elements of physical comedy that critics viewed as distasteful and base. Bărbuță reserved some praise for Melania Cârje, who appeared as Zița, but noted that, overall, Rafael had betrayed Caragiale's commitment to "artistic brevity and decency", managing to display the exact immorality that "false puritans" had warned against in 1879. This new genre, focused on depicting the "sordid" and "unsettling" atmosphere of the mahala, was prevalent throughout the following decades. Calion believes that experimentalism reached its "peak" in 1979, when Alexa Visarion redid A Stormy Night at Giulești Theater—its protagonists displayed a "highly aggressive stupor", with the exception of Spiridon (Răzvan Vasilescu), appearing as the "prototype" of "indolent stupidity".

As reported by theatrologist Mircea Ghițulescu, by the late 1980s the play had become an "unfortunate text, like all masterpieces, for being subject to all kinds of reconstructions and misconstructions, treated and mistreated from the most sophisticated angles". Experimentalism was always contrasted by classical-comedic, "innocent" versions, as with Lucian Giurchescu's burlesque interpretation, done for the Bucharest Comedy Theater in 1973. During the early- to mid-1970s, Gelu Bogdan Ivașcu took on as Rică for productions at the National Theater Cluj, and received praise for returning the character to his roots—rather than resuming a caricature with its mannerisms, he aimed to depict the firebrand journalist as a man of his time, made ridiculous by his skewed perspective on things. The sociological approach was carried into the realm of semiotic literary criticism by mathematician Solomon Marcus, who represented A Stormy Night and other Caragiale comedies as mathematical games, evidencing the strategies available to each character.

Controversies were then resumed with the television play, directed by Sorana Coroamă-Stanca and aired by TVR in January 1984. Critic Aurel Bădescu disliked the liberties taken from the original text, including a number of plot holes, and argued that only Tora Vasilescu as Zița had properly researched for her role. Another critic, Constantin Radu-Maria, objected to the "clown-like" performance of Horațiu Mălăele as Venturiano, as well to his being assigned additional lines from Titircă, Sotirescu & C-ie, which give the impression of a "foreign body". Coroamă-Stanca's interpretation was re-reviewed in 2017 by Constantin Paraschivescu, who praised both Mălăele and Vasilescu, while also noting that Octavian Cotescu as Dumitrache had added an "uncommon nuance"—genuinely hurt, rather than simply infuriated, by Venturiano's apparent stalking of his wife.

The fall of communism in December 1989 allowed for the productions of A Stormy Night which combined artistic experimentation with political commentary. Mircea Cornișteanu, who was involved with Cazimir in creating the Caragiale-inspired Party of Free Change, had "enormous success" in 1995, when he redid the play in modern post-revolutionary setting. His vision, taken up by the Târgu Mureș National Theater, had Dumitrache managing a private limited company in a half-ruined Bucharest, but moved the spotlight on Veta (Suzana Macovei). Similar guidelines were traced by Dan Micu for a 1996 show at Nottara, which was set in a "degraded mahala", mixing communist devastation of the urban landscape with the nouveau riche mentality of its increasingly affluent inhabitants.

Two years later, Odeon (formerly Giulești) Theater staged Mihai Măniuțiu's highly successful production of the play, with Marian Râlea as Rică, Marin Moraru as Dumitrache and Gheorghe Dinică as Ipingescu. It attracted attention for depicting Veta (Oana Pellea) and Chiriac (Marcel Iureș) as living a "harrowing romance", as well as for picking an overweight and experienced actress (Dorina Lazăr) to play Zița. In 2002, Felix Alexa directed another TNB version, which earned praise from cultural journalist Dan C. Mihăilescu for being conservative and restorative, as well as for adding "a regimen of levitation, of oneiric extravaganza", with "Spiridon as Puck". Mihăilescu was positively impressed by Dan Puric as a "dastardly" Venturiano, noting that he carried all of Act II.

In early 2008, the play's 130th anniversary was marked with another staging, taken up by Gelu Colceag for Palatul Copiilor—with Ioan Gyuri Pascu as Venturiano, Maia Morgenstern as Veta, and Monica Anghel as Zița. Colceag changed the historical setting, adapting it to the early years of Romanian communism. A series of bronze sculptures done in the 2000s by Ioan Bolborea, and subsequently displayed outside the TNB, features Caragiale and several of his characters, using the real-life actors of various productions as his models. Rică was selected by Bolborea to dominate over the landscape, a "central axis" of the monument.

== Translations ==
Given that A Stormy Night dwells heavily on language humor, translations of the text have often taken the form of adaptation and linguistic innovation. An anonymous German version, published in the 1950s, remains praised by theatergoers for "adhering close to Caragiale's linguistic subtleties", and was still used in 2007 by the Radu Stanca National Theatre. A Portuguese version, completed in Brazil by Ático Vilas-Boas da Mota, has the mahala speaking in "Carioca" sociolect. Absurdist playwright (and Caragiale aficionado) Eugène Ionesco completed the French adaptation, Une Nuit orageuse, in 1950, done as a means to "keep himself entertained" at a time of tension and uncertainty in his own life. This text was only published in 1994, alongside versions of other Caragialesque plays, done by Monica Lovinescu; Ionesco's retelling, nominally in French, in fact produced a "new language", generally by calquing the original's malapropisms. The delay in publishing means that it was predated by other translations; one of them, penned by diplomat Valentin Lipatti, was used by Jean Grecault's company for a run of the play at Drancy, coinciding with the Franco–Romanian Friendship Week in October 1967.

An Italian translation appeared in Florence in 1960, as part of Giuseppe Petronio's anthology of Romanian theater. Less inventive in terms of language, it was criticized by Cioculescu for its various errors of interpretation and its unusual rendition of Caragiale's nomenclature. Spanish versions include one used by Montevideo's Comedy Theater in 1965—with Enrique Guarnero and Jorge Triador billed. A new Italian version by Roberto Mazzucco was adapted for television by RAI and aired as early as January 1970. This production starred Marisa Belli as Veta, Vincenzo De Toma as Dumitrache, and Umberto Ceriani as Rică. Around that time, Bengali versions of both A Stormy Night and O scrisoare pierdută had been completed by philologist Amita Ray, and used for theatrical productions in Kolkata—the former was produced by the Pachamitram troupe in August 1969. Ray, who was employed as part of an effort to showcase India–Romania relations under Ceaușescu, worked on "Indianizing" the play's language and Romanian setting, for which she won acclaim in the local press.

Under communism, Caragiale's comedies acquired a cult following throughout the Eastern Bloc. The complete Russian translations appeared in 1952, with A Stormy Night, done by Ilie Constantinovski, taken up by the Moscow Satire Theatre that same year. The play was no longer performed anywhere in the Soviet Union to 1983, when Oleg Yefremov and his Moscow Art Theatre invited in Visarion. The subsequent Visarion production was done from an updated translation by poet Lev Berinsky. The "Serbo-Croatian" version of A Stormy Night, penned by Adam Puslojić, was showcased by the Yugoslav Radio Television at some point before 1978. In 1973, the play was translated by Yordan Stratiev and Gergana Stratieva for theatergoers in the People's Republic of Bulgaria—where Caragiale was already a familiar author, mainly through O scrisoare pierdută. Slovak versions by Jindra Husková were also being used as the basis of stagings filmed by the Czechoslovak Television, while the first Polish version was completed before 1980 by Danuta Bieńkowska. The 1879 comedy was also revived in the Hungarian People's Republic (with an inaugural staging at Vidám Színpad in 1951). In 1982, Veszprém's Petőfi Theater employed Dan Micu to direct its own rendition of the play, with which it also toured Romania.

The Hungarians of Romania also helped popularize the text. In 1984, the State Magyar Theater in Sfântu Gheorghe premiered Attila Seprődi Kiss' rendering of A Stormy Night, with Mihály Kőmíves appearing as Venturiano. Another version was performed locally that same year, when Târgu Mureș National Theater hired Gábor Tompa as stage director. He won Calion's praise for his generally classical lines, with an added note of personal vision in depicting the "existential ugliness" of the mahala. The show contrasted Chiriac and the two women protagonists, as a triad of the "biological élan", with the "political" and "mimed existence" of Chiriac, Ipingescu, and Venturiano. Tompa also directed another production, taken up in 1988–1989 by the Hungarian Theatre of Cluj—with Sándor Keresztes as Venturiano, it received notice for its overall fidelity to the original text (but was also criticized for introducing additional layers of satire). A Stormy Night was also used as a text by other minorities in Romania, developing their own forms of regional theater. In early 2008, Toma Enache's version in Aromanian (Unã noapti furtunoasã) was staged by La Steaua and Nottara companies in Zalău. A Romani version of the play, titled Iech riat balvalali, premiered at Teatrul Mic of Bucharest in August 2002. Journalist Rudy Moca has penned a second such adaptation, Jekh răt lisăme, which was taken up by Masca Theater in 2010.
