= Mihai Eminescu National Theatre =

Historical monument in Moldova

Coordinates: 47.0215°N 28.8360°E

- Teatrul Național „Mihai Eminescu”
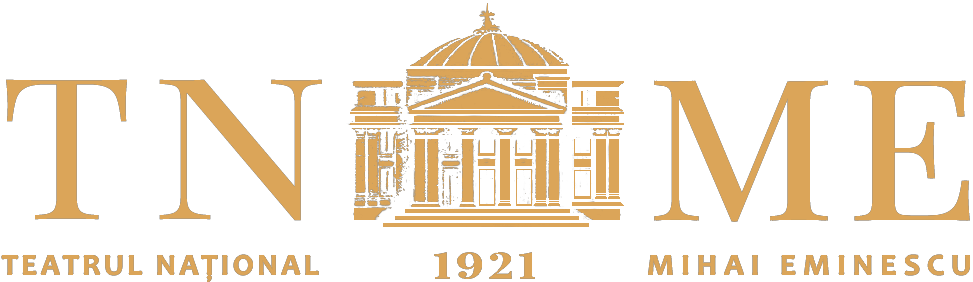

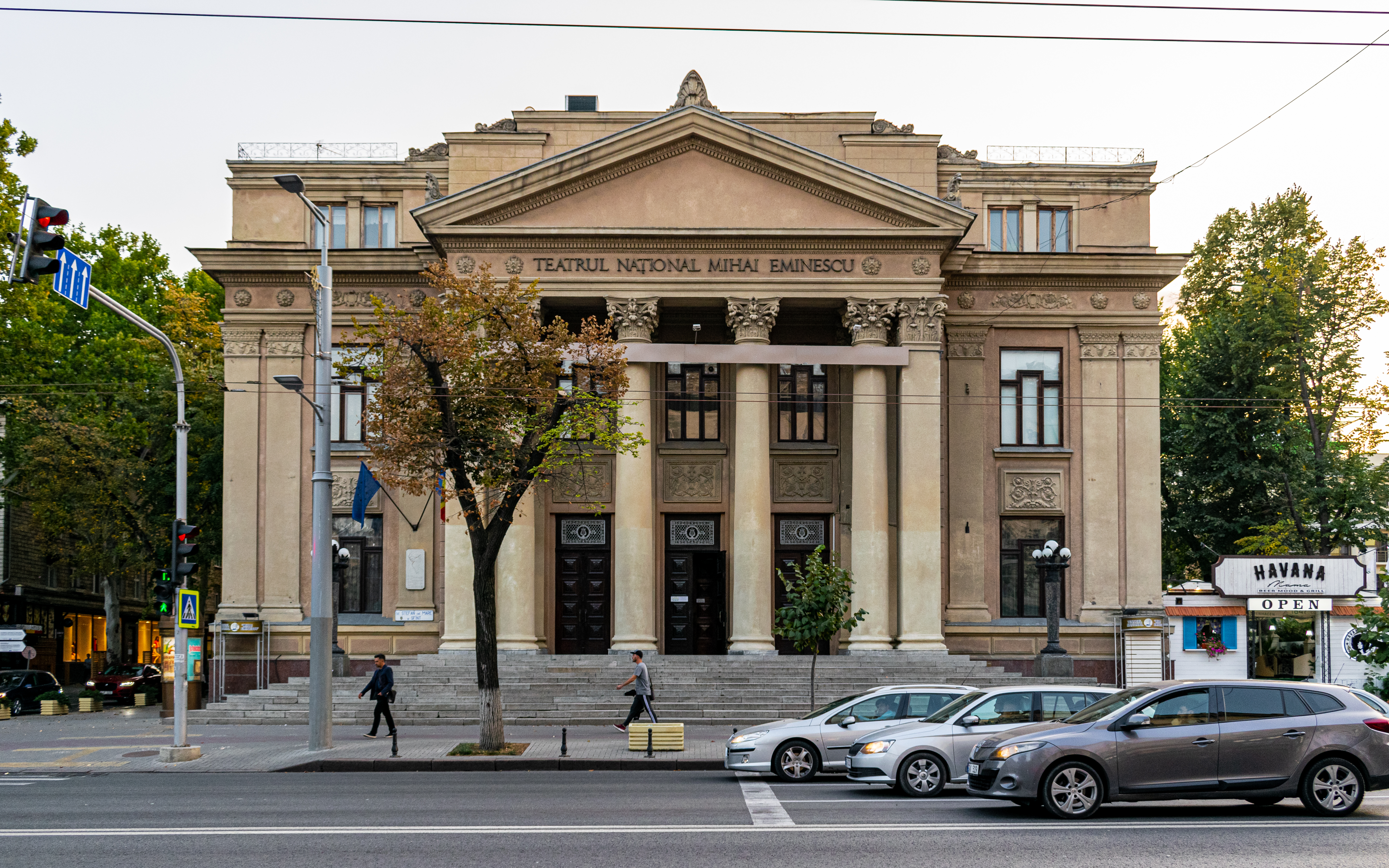
- Interactive map of Mihai Eminescu National Theatre
- Address: 79 Stephen the Great Boulevard; Chișinău; Moldova

Construction
- Opened: 10 October 1920

Website
- tnme.md

The Mihai Eminescu National Theatre (Romanian: Teatrul Național „Mihai Eminescu”) is a historical and architectural monument built in neoclassical style located in Central Chișinău, Republic of Moldova. Originally constructed to house various cultural activities in 1931, the purpose of the building and its name changed several times over the years. In 1988 the theater was named in honor of the Romanian poet from Moldavia Mihai Eminescu. The theater hosts plays and concerts.

== History ==
Located on 79 Ștefan cel Mare Boulevard, the main frame of the building was erected in 1931 – 1932. The building was designed by architect Nicolae Stănescu in neoclassical style to host conferences, concerts, a museum, a library and an art gallery.

In 1932, during a period of economic depression, the Ministry of Finance revised the public budget towards a reduction which led to the construction not being completed. In 1934 the building entered into the custody of the Chișinău Court of Appeal, but the idea to resume construction became popular only in 1938. The king supported the initiative at that time, but this remained only on paper. In 1940 the Soviet authorities decided to complete the construction. The fact that the building was unfinished and of no use saved it from destruction by the retreating Soviet military, which mined, blew up and set fire to most of the city's public buildings.

In 1942, the town hall decided to initiate the completion of the construction of the building, planning for it to house the cultural institutions left homeless following the withdrawal of the Soviet Army. The halls for the Municipal Library, the Conservatory, an 800-seat theater and a gallery were to be prepared. In 1943, oak doors and windows were installed. At the beginning of 1944, in the main hall, two of the decorative panels executed by the sculptor Claudia Cobizeva were installed. In 1945, the Soviet authorities ordered the beginning of the reconstruction works of the Cultural Palace building, which was completed in 1953, as a building for the theater.

Along the years, the purpose of the building has changed from multipurpose palace to theater and the architecture and decorations were adapted to the new needs. The name changed as well along the way: Cultural Palace, Administrative Palace, Palace of Justice, Union Palace, Dvoreț kulturî, Dvoreț iskusstv, Dram-teatr.

It is falsely stated that the building was constructed after the Second World War as an achievement of Soviet architects. The building was awarded the title “monument of art, architecture and history of national significance”, and entered the Register of monuments of history and culture of Chisinau at the initiative of the Academy of Sciences of Moldova.

== Style ==
The theater building, built on three levels, the last of which is an attic, built in a basement, occupies the corner of a neighborhood, which had once been reserved for the police square, bordered by Mihai Eminescu Street. It was located with a retreat from the boulevard line, with the main entrance raised on a stepped podium, which gives the building an increased monumentality. The plan of the theater is rectangular, with a narrow façade perpendicular to Ștefan cel Mare Boulevard. The spatial composition of the theater is dominated by the cylindrical volume of the theater, surrounded by three parts of balconies, the spaces of the foyer and corridors, crowned with a spherical dome. The main facade is monumental with a central portico located in the axis of symmetry, consisting of four columns of the Corinthian order, flanked by two square pillars in section, solved in the same stylistic key, on which a triangular pediment rests. The carved relief of the tympanum, executed by the sculptor L. Dubinovsky, disappeared during the last reconstruction. The side facades have a symmetrical composition, with central porticoes of six columns in the middle of the facades crowned with triangular pediments, through which the side entrances in the buildings take place. Covered with a dome, the surface of which was painted with the image of the dancers of a choir, according to the sketches of the painter LP Grigorașenco. The lodges and balconies repeat the configuration of the hall, being arranged perimeter, which is reached by a monumental staircase with three ramps and stairs located at the corners of the square circumscribed by the hall of four. Two secondary side entrances, located to the south and north, lead directly from the street and from the square in the foyer of the theater. Two other entrances, located symmetrically to those described above, lead to the stage, in the administration and the rooms for the actors, props warehouses, etc. The characteristics of the building include large spaces, marble-clad foyers, glossy parquet brought from Austria, marble staircase, red velvet-clad hall, chandeliers.

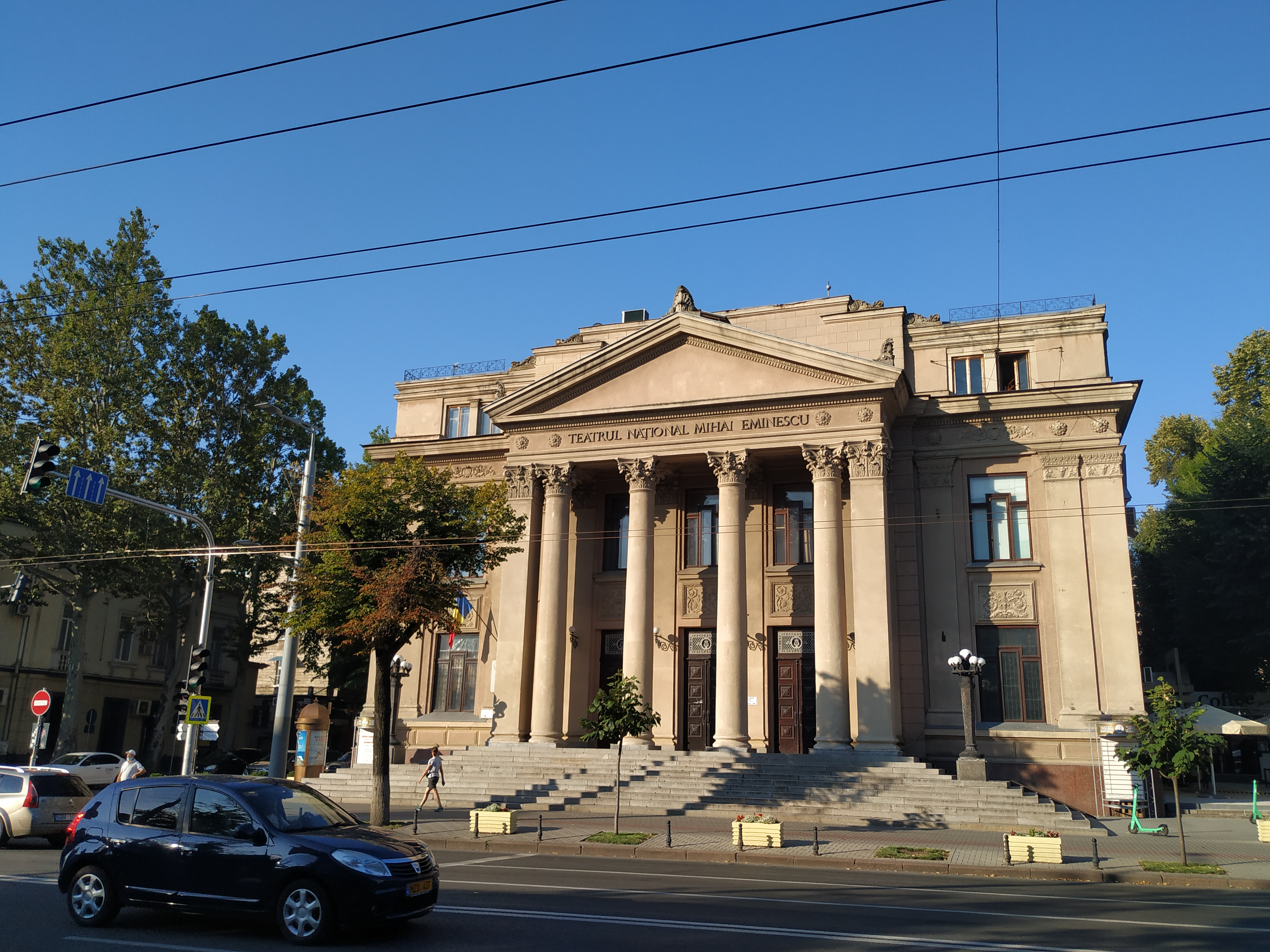
Mihai Eminescu National Theater
