= Saint Spyridon the New Church =

Church in Bucharest, Romania

- Sfântul Spiridon Nou
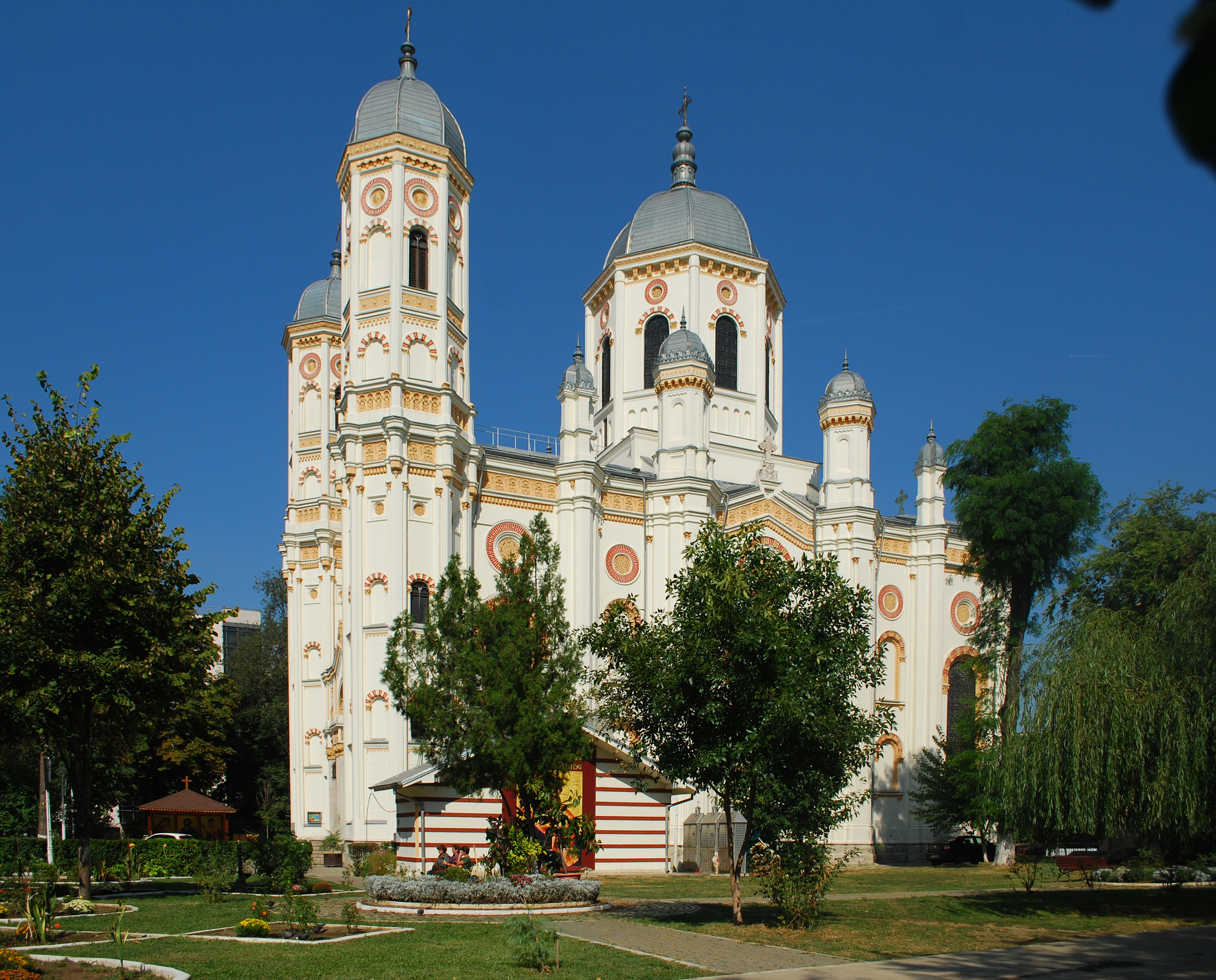
- View of the church from the south
- Saint Spyridon the New Church
- 44°25′26.21″N 26°6′11.98″E
- Location: Calea Șerban Vodă, no. 29, Bucharest
- Country: Romania
- Denomination: Eastern Orthodox
- Sui iuris church: Rome
- Churchmanship: Romanian Orthodox Church

History
- Status: Church
- Dedication: Saint Spyridon

Architecture
- Functional status: Active
- Years built: 1852–1858
- Completed: 1858; 168 years ago

The Saint Spyridon the New Church (Romanian: Sfântul Spiridon Nou) is a Romanian Orthodox church in Bucharest, Romania on Calea Șerban Vodă, no. 29. Originally built with gothic influences in 1852–1858, it was strongly modified by Patriarch Justinian (especially the towers).

== Notable burials ==
- Constantine Hangerli, Prince of Wallachia (died 1799)

== Gallery ==
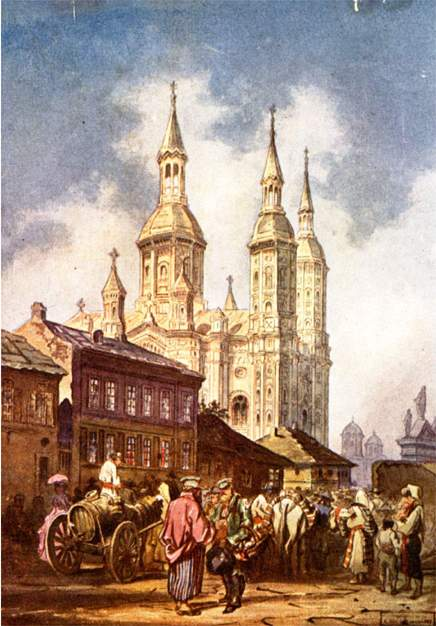
The church in 1860

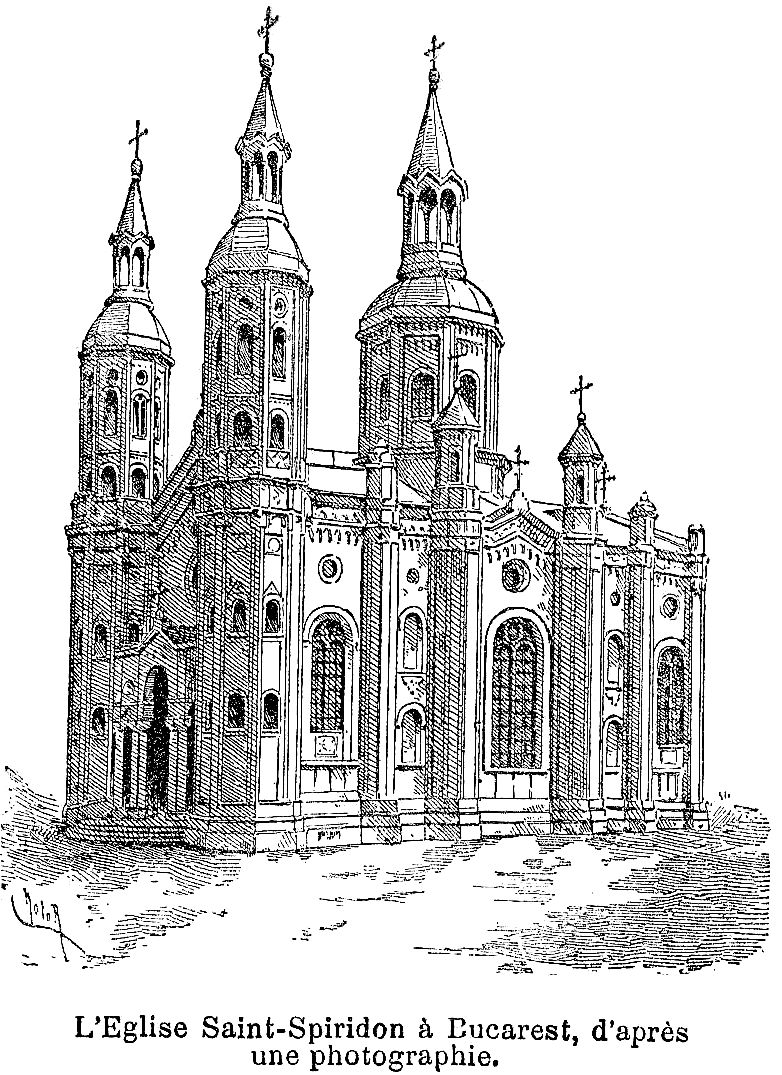
The church in 1880

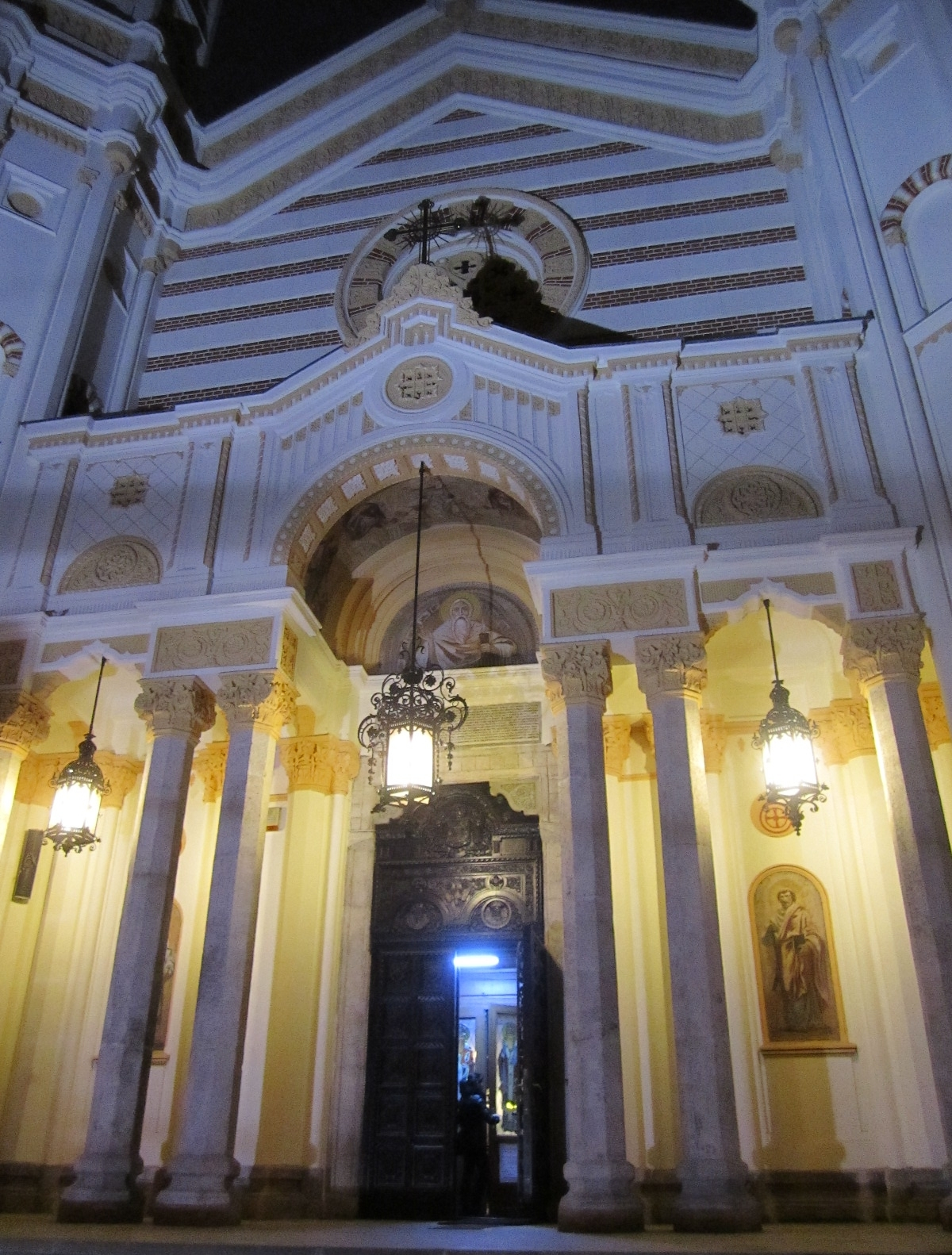
Entrance of the Church

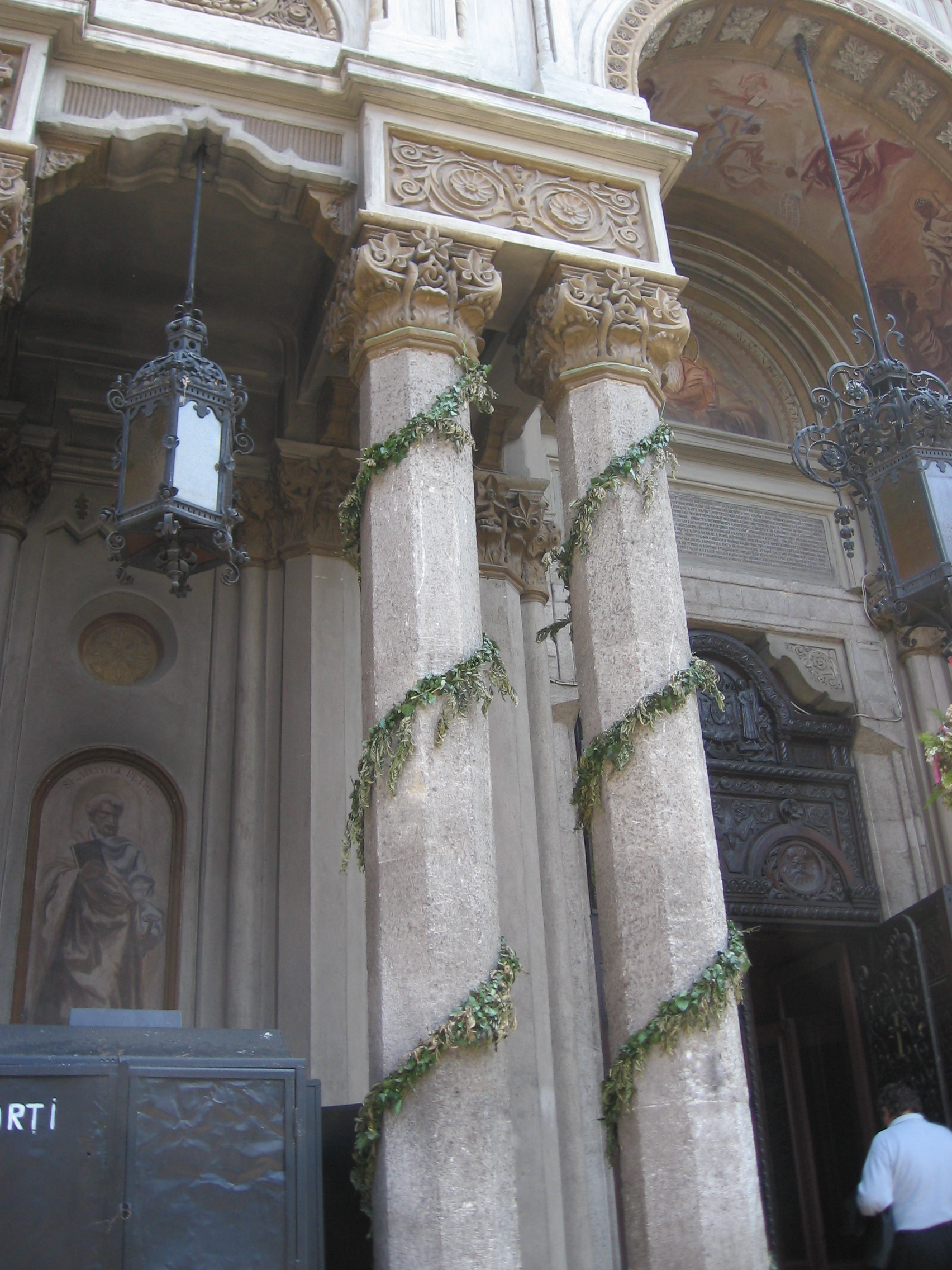
Two columns at the entrance

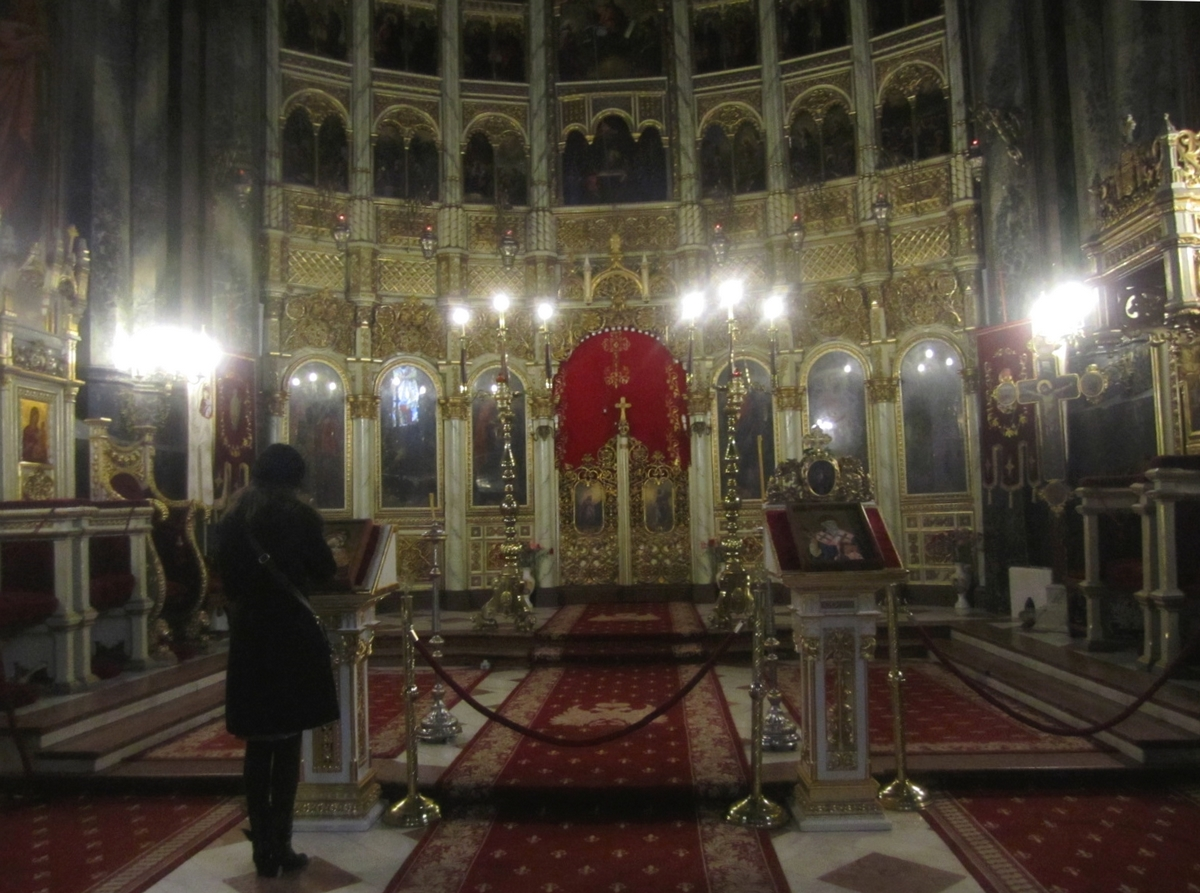
Iconostasis

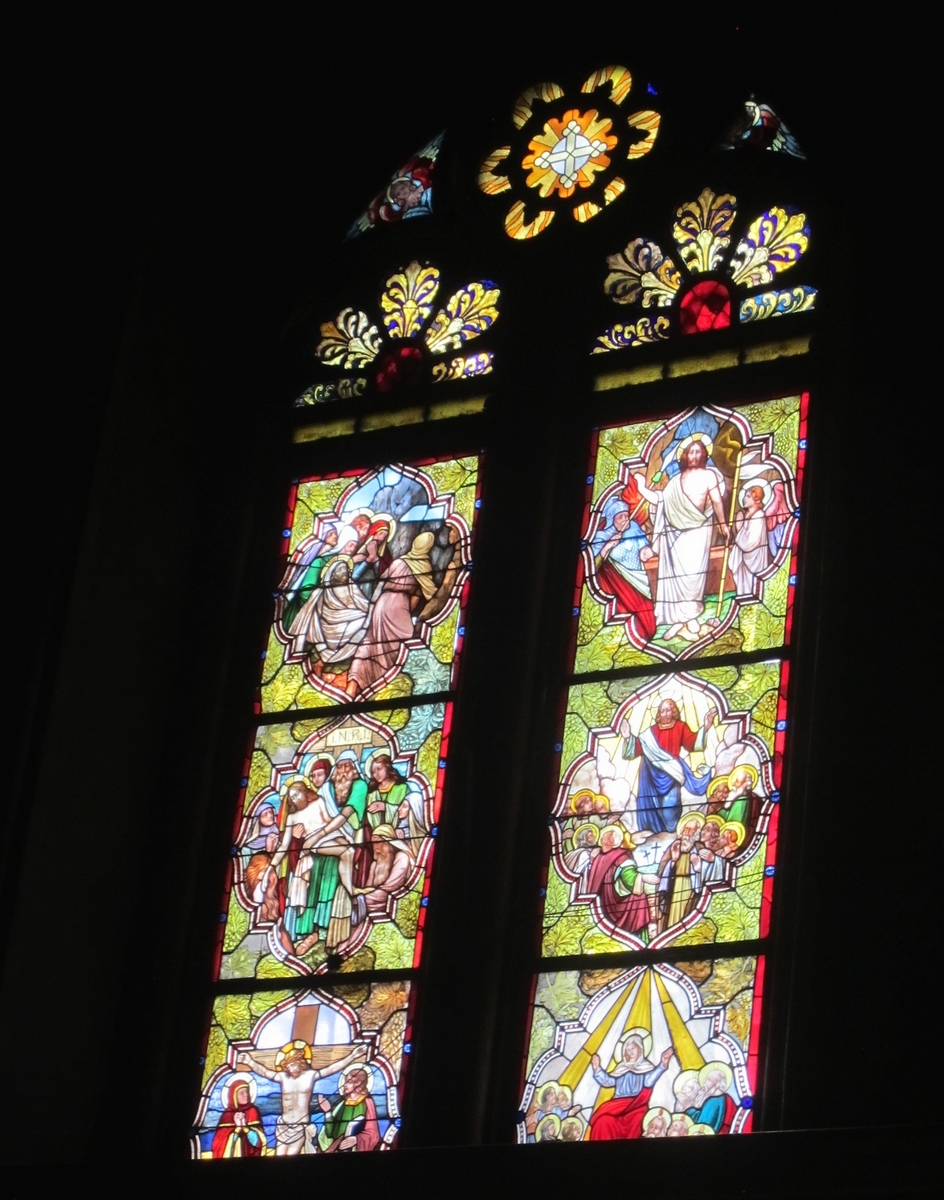
Stained glass
