= Vox Populi, Vox Dei =

1709 Whig tract

Vox Populi, Vox Dei is a Whig tract of 1709, titled after a Latin phrase meaning "the voice of the people is the voice of God". It was expanded in 1710 and later reprintings as The Judgment of whole Kingdoms and Nations: Concerning the Rights, Power, and Prerogative of Kings, and the Rights, Privileges, and Properties of the People. The author is unknown but was most likely either Robert Ferguson or Thomas Harrison. There is no evidence for the persistent attribution to Daniel Defoe or John Somers as authors.

== Argument about the equality of humans ==
The most cited section of the revised (1710) version of the pamphlet read:

There being no natural or divine Law for any Form of Government, or that one Person rather than another should have the sovereign Administration of Affairs, or have Power over many thousand different Families, who are by Nature all equal, being of the same Rank, promiscuously born to the same Advantages of Nature, and to the Use of the same common Faculties; therefore Mankind is at Liberty to choose what Form of Government they like best.

== Political meaning of the title ==
The 1709 tract's use of the Latin phrase was consistent with earlier usage of vox populi, vox Dei in English political history since at least as early as 1327 when the Archbishop of Canterbury Walter Reynolds brought charges against King Edward II in a sermon "Vox populi, vox Dei". The proverb had been known as far back as the Carolingian period. Alcuin (c. 735 – 804) mentions the proverb in a letter to the emperor Charlemagne, while personally stating his opposition to it and the democratic idea that it expresses on the grounds that "the riotousness of the crowd is always very close to madness".

== Reprints ==
Vox Populi, Vox Dei: being true Maxims of Government was the next year, 1710, republished under the title of The Judgment of whole Kingdoms and Nations, with considerable alterations.

The 10th printing of the revised tract was in 1771.

== Other works ==
The title Vox Populi, Vox Dei was also borrowed in a Jacobite pamphlet to argue against the Whigs in 1719, resulting in the hanging of the young printer John Matthews. In popular culture, the phrase appears as the titles of two songs in the second season of Hazbin Hotel: "VOX POPULI" and "VOX DEI".
